= List of fellows of IEEE Communications Society =

The Fellow grade of membership is the highest level of membership, and cannot be applied for directly by the member – instead the candidate must be nominated by others. This grade of membership is conferred by the IEEE Board of Directors in recognition of a high level of demonstrated extraordinary accomplishment.

Year	Fellow	Citation
1968	Jose B. Cruz Jr.	For significant contributions in circuit theory and the sensitivity analysis of control systems
1968	Robert G. Gallager	For contributions to information theory and error correcting codes
1970	Thomas Kailath	For inspired teaching of and contributions to information, communication, and control theory
1973	Andrew Viterbi	For contributions to information and communication theory
1973	Norman Abramson	For contributions to engineering education, coding theory, pattern recognition, and computer networks
1973	Julian J. Bussgang	For contributions to sequential detection theory, radar techniques, and statistical communication theory
1973	Stephen Sik-Sang Yau	For contributions to switch theory, the reliability of computing systems, and engineering education
1975	J. J. Stiffler	For contribution to the field of synchronous communications
1977	Hisashi Kobayashi	For contributions to data transmission and to modeling and performance analysis of computer communication systems
1978	John O. Limb	For contributions to efficient coding of color and monochrome video signals
1983	Tamer Başar	For contributions to multiperson decision making and deterministic and stochastic dynamic game theory
1983	Henri Nussbaumer	For contributions to the theory and development of line switching and data transmission systems
1983	Stewart D. Personick	For contributions to the theory and application of optical fiber transmission systems
1984	John Baras	For contributions to distributed parameter systems theory, quantum and nonlinear estimation, and control of queuing systems
1985	Simon S. Lam	For contributions to the understanding of multiple access techniques, packet-switching networks, and communication protocols
1985	Fouad Tobagi	For contributions to the field of computer communications and local area networks
1986	Erol Gelenbe	For leadership in the development of computer system performance evaluation
1986	Richard D. Gitlin	For contributions to data communication techniques
1987	Victor B. Lawrence	For contributions to the understanding of quantization effects in digital signal processors and the applications of digital signal processing to data communications
1987	Vincent Poor	For contributions to the theory of robust linear filtering applied to signal detection and estimation
1989	Prathima Agrawal	For contributions to computer-aided design and testing of integrated circuits
1989	Bruce Hajek	For contributions to stochastic systems, communications networks, and control systems
1989	Debasis Mitra	For contributions to mathematical foundations of computer and communication system design and analysis
1989	Yrjö Neuvo	For contributions to digital-signal processing algorithms and engineering education
1989	John Vig	For contributions to the technology of quartz crystals for precision frequency control and timing
1990	Salvatore D. Morgera	For contributions to finite-dimensional signal processing methods
1990	Hussein T. Mouftah	For contributions to communications modeling
1991	Arogyaswami Paulraj	For leadership in and technical contributions to the development of sonar systems in India
1991	Martha E. Sloan	For contributions to engineering education, leadership in the development of computer engineering education as a discipline, and leadership in extending engineering education to women
1992	Vijay Bhargava	For leadership in the development and applications of error control coding devices
1992	Hideki Imai	For contributions to the theory of coded modulation and two-dimensional codes
1992	Michael G. Pecht	For contributions to and leadership in electronics packaging and reliability
1993	Jules Bellisio	For contributions to and leadership in the conception and realization of digital television systems for current and emerging telecommunication networks
1993	Imrich Chlamtac	For contributions to the design and analysis of channel control protocols and their application to communication networks
1993	Ferdo Ivanek	For contributions to the development of fundamental-frequency microwave oscillators and amplifiers and their application in analog and digital radio relay systems
1993	Raj Jain	For contributions to performance analysis and modeling of computer systems and networks and for providing a new direction for solutions to the problem of network congestion
1993	Jean Walrand	For the development of highly efficient techniques for the analysis, control, and simulation of stochastic networks and stochastic resource allocation problems
1994	Chen Wen-tsuen	For contributions to software engineering and parallel processing systems design
1994	David J. Farber	For contributions to computer languages, distributed computing and advanced computer communications networking
1994	Lev Levitin	For contributions to physical information theory and quantum communication systems
1994	Lionel Ni	For contributions to parallel processing and distributed systems
1994	Shlomo Shamai	For contributions to Shannon theory as applied to the evaluation of reliability of communication channels
1995	Don Towsley	For contributions to modeling and analysis of computer networks
1996	John Cioffi	For contributions to the theory, practice, and promotion of advanced communication methods in data transmission and storage
1996	Ian F. Akyildiz	For contributions to performance analysis of computer communication networks
1996	Peter Mitchell Grant	For contributions to surface acoustic wave processing and leadership in signal processing research
1997	Michael Honig	For contributions to adaptive interference suppression and multiuser detection of digital communications
1997	Raymond J. Leopold	For leadership and contributions to world-wide satellite communications and personal wireless
1997	Rico Malvar	For contributions to the theory and practice of lapped transforms, fast multirate filter banks, and signal coding
1997	Satish K. Tripathi	For advancing the state of the art in computer and network systems analysis and for excellence in technical and educational leadership
1998	Joseph Katz	For contributions to the development of optoelectronic devices and systems for optical communications, remote sensing, and bar-code reading
1998	Yasuo Matsuyama	For contributions to learning algorithms with competition
1998	Andrew S. Tanenbaum	For outstanding contributions to research and education in computer networks and operating systems
1998	Marilyn Wolf	For contributions to Hardware/Software Co-Design
1999	Behnaam Aazhang	For contributions to multi-user wideband digital cellular communications
1999	Arun K. Somani	For contributions to the theory and application of computer networks
1999	Norman C. Beaulieu	For contributions to the analysis and modeling of wireless data and digital communication systems
1999	Andrzej Jajszczyk	For contributions to the theory and practice of telecommunications switching
1999	Craig Partridge	For contributions to the development of Internet protocols that support larger and faster networks
2000	Nambirajan Seshadri	For contributions to theory and practice of reliable communications over wireless channels
2000	Demosthenis Teneketzis	For contributions to the theory of decentralized information systems and stochastic control
2001	Li Fung Chang	For contributions to the design and analysis of radio links and networks for wireless voice/data services
2001	Moshe Kam	For contributions to the theory of decision fusion and distributed detection
2001	Vincenzo Piuri	For contributions to neural network techniques and embedded digital architectures for industrial applications
2001	Belur V. Dasarathy	For contributions to pattern recognition, sensor fusion, automated intelligent decision system design and image processing
2002	Mostafa Ammar	For contributions to the design of scalable multimedia services and their network support
2002	Elisa Bertino	For contributions to the theory of object-oriented databases, temporal databases, and database security
2002	Evangelos S. Eleftheriou	For contributions to equalization and coding, and for noise-predictive maximum likelihood detection in magnetic recording
2002	Tapio Saramäki	For contributions to the design and implementation of digital filters and filter banks
2003	Mario Gerla	For contributions to ad hoc wireless networks
2003	K. J. Ray Liu	For contributions to algorithms, architectures, and implementations for signal processing
2003	Bhavani Thuraisingham	For contributions to secure systems involving database systems, distributed systems, and the web
2004	Jon Crowcroft	For contributions to network protocols
2004	Lajos Hanzo	For contributions to adaptive wireless communication systems
2004	Björn Ottersten	For contributions to antenna signal processing and wireless communications
2004	Sanjoy Paul	For contributions to the design and development of communication network protocols
2004	Subramaniam Ramadorai	For leadership in the development of multidisciplinary software solutions
2004	Lee Swindlehurst	For contributions to the field of space-time signal processing for radar and wireless communications
2004	David L. Tennenhouse	For leadership in the development of active networks
2004	Moe Z. Win	For contributions to wideband wireless transmission
2005	Ljiljana Trajković	For contributions to computer aided design tools for circuit analysis
2005	Andrea Goldsmith	For contributions to the development of adaptive techniques and the analysis of fundamental capacity limits for wireless communication systems
2005	Mohammad S. Obaidat	For contributions to adaptive learning, pattern recognition and system simulation
2005	Han Vinck	For contributions to coding techniques
2006	Karlheinz Brandenburg	For contributions to audio coding
2006	Frank Kschischang	For contributions to trellis structures, graphical models and iterative decoding techniques for error-correcting codes
2006	Anurag Kumar	For contributions to communication networks and distributed computing systems
2006	Ulrich Reimers	For contributions to the development of Digital Video Broadcasting (DVB)
2006	Henning Schulzrinne	For contributions to the design of protocols, applications, and algorithms for Internet multimedia
2006	Gary Sullivan	For contributions to video coding and its standardization
2006	Lixia Zhang	For contributions to the architecture and signaling protocols in packet switched networks
2007	Grace Clark	For contributions in block adaptive filtering
2007	Fadhel M. Ghannouchi	For contributions to advanced microwave amplification circuits and sub-systems
2007	Zygmunt Haas	For contributions to wireless and mobile ad-hoc networks
2007	Abbas Jamalipour	For contributions to next generation networks for traffic control
2007	Urbashi Mitra	For contributions to multiuser wideband digital communication systems
2007	Biswanath Mukherjee	For contributions to architectures, algorithms, and protocols for optical networks
2007	Dalma Novak	For contributions to enabling technologies for the implementation of fiber radio systems
2007	Christopher Rose	For contributions to wireless communication systems theory
2007	Ness B. Shroff	For contributions to the modeling, analysis and control of computer communication networks
2007	David James Skellern	For contributions to high speed devices and systems for wireless and wireline communications networks
2008	Steven H. Low	For contributions to internet congestion control
2008	Muriel Médard	For contributions to wideband wireless fading channels and network coding
2008	Klara Nahrstedt	For contributions to end-to-end quality of service management of multimedia systems
2008	Radia Perlman	For contributions to network routing and security protocols
2008	William Webb	For leadership in the deployment of third generation mobile and wireless LAN technology
2008	Yutaka Yasuda	For contributions to mobile digital satellite communication systems
2008	Jinyun Zhang	For contributions to broadband wireless transmission and networking technology
2008	Weihua Zhuang	For contributions to mobile communications and networks
2009	Keren Bergman	For contributions to development of optical interconnection and transport networks
2009	Sheila Hemami	For contributions to robust and perceptual image and video communications
2009	Gustavo de Veciana	For contributions to the design of communication networks
2009	Gerhard Fettweis	For contributions to signal processing algorithms and chip implementation architectures for communications
2009	Eve Riskin	For contributions to variable-rate image and video compression and to engineering education
2009	Adam Skorek	For contributions to electro-thermal analysis of industrial processes
2009	Chai Keong Toh	For contributions to communication protocols in ad hoc mobile wireless networks
2009	Jie Wu	For contributions to mobile ad hoc networks and multicomputer systems
2009	Yuanyuan Yang	For contributions to parallel and distributed computing systems
2010	Pooi-Yuen Kam	For contributions to receiver design and performance analysis for wireless communications
2010	Wanjiun Liao	For contributions to communication protocols in multimedia networking
2010	John C.S. Lui	For contributions to performance modeling and analysis of storage communication systems and peer-to-peer networks
2010	Victor S. Miller	For contributions to elliptic curve cryptography
2010	Leslie Rusch	For contributions in optical and wireless communications systems
2010	Milica Stojanovic	For contributions to underwater acoustic communications
2011	Debabani Choudhury	For contributions to millimeter wave enabling technologies
2011	Elza Erkip	For contributions to multi-user and cooperative communications
2011	Bob Frankston	For contributions to the first electronic spread sheet and home networking
2011	Robert W. Heath Jr.	For contributions to multiple antenna wireless communications
2011	Catherine Rosenberg	For contributions to resource management in wireless and satellite networks
2011	Jawad Salehi	For contributions to fundamental principles of optical code division multiple access
2011	Neil Siegel	For leadership in the development of the digital battlefield
2011	Jane Simmons	For contributions to optical network architecture and algorithms
2011	Anna Scaglione	For contributions to filterbank precoding for wireless transmission and signal processing for cooperative sensor networks
2011	Min Wu	For contributions to multimedia security and forensics
2012	George William Arnold	For leadership in architecture and protocols for the electric grid and telecommunication networks
2012	Raouf Boutaba	For contributions to automated network and service management methodologies and applications
2012	Stefano Galli	For contributions to theory, practice, and standardization of power line communication networks
2012	Ryuji Kohno	For contributions to spread spectrum and ultra wideband technologies and applications
2012	Junyi Li	For contributions to modulation techniques for mobile broadband communications systems
2012	Marco Luise	For contributions to synchronization and signal processing in communications
2012	Eytan Modiano	For contributions to cross-layer resource allocation algorithms for wireless, satellite, and optical networks
2012	Sivaram Murthy	For contributions to resource management in high performance real-time computing and communication systems
2012	Zhisheng Niu	For contributions to collaborative radio resource management in wireless networks
2012	George N. Rouskas	For contributions in algorithms, protocols, and architectures of optical networks
2012	Pierangela Samarati	For contributions to the design, monitoring and control of electrical heat tracing for industrial and commercial applications
2012	Dominique Schreurs	For contributions to nonlinear vectorial measurement-based experimental design and modeling
2012	Elvino Silveira Sousa	For contributions to wireless systems, including modulation techniques and transmitter diversity
2012	Jiangtao Wen	For contributions to multimedia communication technology and standards
2012	Junshan Zhang	For contributions to cross-layer optimization of wireless networks
2012	Qian Zhang	For contributions to the mobility and spectrum management of wireless networks and mobile communications
2013	Marco Corsi	For development of high-speed amplifiers and analog to-digital converters
2013	Georgios Ginis	For contributions to transmission optimization in digital subscriber loops
2013	Sushil Jajodia	For contributions to information security, data protection, and privacy
2013	Xiaohua Jia	For contributions to distributed computing systems and multicast communications
2013	Lina Karam	For contributions to perception-based visual processing, image and video communications, and digital filtering
2013	Yonina Eldar	For contributions to compressed sampling, generalized sampling, and convex optimization
2013	Tamas Linder	For contributions to source coding and quantization
2013	Erchin Serpedin	For contributions to synchronization of communication systems
2013	Gaurav Sharma	For contributions to electronic imaging and media security
2013	Masayuki Tanimoto	For contributions to the development of free-viewpoint television and its MPEG standard
2013	Zhi Tian	For contributions to ultra-wideband wireless communications and localization
2013	Gene Tsudik	For contributions to distributed systems security and privacy
2013	Ephraim Zehavi	For contributions to pragmatic coding and bit interleaving
2013	Qing Zhao	For contributions to learning and decision theory in dynamic systems with applications to cognitive networking
2014	Brice Achkir	For contributions to diagnostics of physical layer design in gigabit digital transmission systems
2014	Robert Arno	For contributions in applying stochastic modeling techniques to power distribution systems for critical facilities
2014	Sunghyun Choi	For contributions to development of wireless LAN protocols
2014	Martin Haenggi	For contributions to the spatial modeling and analysis of wireless networks
2014	Fred Heismann	For contributions to understanding, control and mitigation of polarization effects in fiberoptic communication systems
2014	Angel Lozano	For contributions to multiple-input, multiple-output antenna systems
2014	Weidong Mao	For contributions to video on demand technologies and cloud computing
2014	Cecilia Metra	For contributions to the on-line testing and fault-tolerant design of digital circuits and systems
2014	Ioannis Paschalidis	For contributions to the control and optimization of communication and sensor networks, manufacturing systems, and biological systems
2014	Magdalena Salazar Palma	For contributions to the application of numerical techniques to electromagnetic modeling
2014	Puneet Sharma	For contributions to the design of scalable networking, software defined networks and energy efficiency in data centers
2014	Krishna Sivalingam	For contributions to medium access control and energy-efficient protocol design in communication networks
2014	Emina Soljanin	For contributions to coding theory and coding schemes for transmission and storage systems
2014	Patrick Thiran	For contributions to network performance analysis
2014	Sarah Kate Wilson	For contributions to orthogonal frequency division multiplexing
2014	Wei Yu	For contributions to optimization techniques for multiple-input-multiple-output communications
2014	Shengli Zhou	For contributions to wireless and underwater acoustic communications
2015	Joseph Cavallaro	For contributions to VLSI architectures and algorithms for signal processing and wireless communications
2015	Chen-Nee Chuah	For contributions to MIMO communications and network management
2015	Matthew Andrews	For contributions to network design and wireless resource allocation
2015	Jean Armstrong	For contributions to the theory and application of orthogonal frequency division multiplexing in wireless and optical communications
2015	Gerhard Bauch	For contributions to iterative processing in multiple-input multiple-output systems
2015	Nuno Borges Carvalho	For contributions on characterization and design of nonlinear RF circuits
2015	Jiannong Cao	For contributions to distributed computing in mobile wireless networks
2015	Biao Chen	For contributions to decentralized signal processing in sensor networks and interference management of wireless networks
2015	Xiuzhen Cheng	For contributions to localization and detection in sensor networks
2015	Iain Collings	For contributions to multiple user and multiple antenna wireless communication systems
2015	John Dallesasse	For contributions to oxidation of III-V semiconductors for photonic device manufacturing
2015	Sajal K. Das	For contributions to parallel and distributed computing
2015	Mérouane Debbah	For contributions to the theory and application of signal processing in wireless networks
2015	Joseph C. Decuir	For contributions to computer graphics and video games
2015	Xiqi Gao	For contributions to broadband wireless communications and multirate signal processing
2015	Amitava Ghosh	For leadership in cellular communication system standardization
2015	Monisha Ghosh	For contributions to cognitive radio and signal processing for communication systems
2015	Deepa Kundur	For contributions to signal processing techniques for multimedia and cyber security
2015	Baochun Li	For contributions to application-layer network protocols and network coding
2015	Yunhao Liu	For contributions to wireless sensor networks and systems
2015	Wenjing Lou	For contributions to information and network security
2015	Detlev Marpe	For contributions to video coding research and standardization
2015	Gianluca Mazzini	For contributions to chaos-based electronic and telecommunication systems design
2015	Krishna Narayanan	For contributions to coding for wireless communications and data storage
2015	Bhaskar Ramamurthi	For development of wireless technology in India
2015	Dan Keun Sung	For contributions to network resource management
2015	Liuqing Yang	For contributions to theory and practice of ultra-wideband communications
2015	Aylin Yener	For contributions to wireless communication theory and wireless information security
2015	Bülent Yener	For contributions to network design optimization and security
2015	Moti Yung	For contributions to cryptography
2015	Yahong Zheng	For contributions to channel modeling and equalization for wireless communications
2016	Wendi Heinzelman	For contributions to algorithms, protocols, and architectures for wireless sensor and mobile networks
2016	Ozgur B. Akan	For contributions to wireless sensor networks
2016	Fan Bai	For contributions to vehicular networking and mobility modeling
2016	Maria-Gabriella Di Benedetto	For contributions to impulse-radio ultra wideband and cognitive networks for wireless communications
2016	Tracy Camp	For contributions to wireless networking
2016	Shigang Chen	For contributions to quality of service provisioning and policy-based security management in computer networks
2016	Gerhard Hancke	For contributions to wireless sensor networks
2016	Dimitrios Hatzinakos	For contributions to signal processing techniques for communications, multimedia and biometrics
2016	Hitoshi Kiya	For contributions to filter structure, data hiding, and multimedia security
2016	Mark Laubach	For leadership in design and standardization of cable modems
2016	Inkyu Lee	For contributions to multiple antenna systems for wireless communications
2016	Ta Sung Lee	For leadership and contributions in communication systems and signal processing
2016	Shaoqian Li	For leadership in development of broadband wireless networks
2016	Songwu Lu	For contributions to wireless and mobile networking and network security
2016	Xiaoli Ma	For contributions to block transmissions over wireless fading channels
2016	Vishal Misra	For contributions to network traffic modeling, congestion control and Internet economics
2016	Zhouyue Pi	For leadership in millimeter wave communication technology
2016	Petar Popovski	For contributions to network coding and multiple access methods in wireless communications
2016	Sundeep Rangan	For contributions to orthogonal frequency division multiple access cellular communication systems
2016	Kui Ren	For contributions to security and privacy in cloud computing and wireless networks
2016	Subhabrata Sen	For contributions to analysis of cross-layer interactions in cellular networks
2016	Sun Sumei	For leadership in design and standardization of wireless communication systems
2016	Sennur Ulukus	For contributions to characterizing performance limits of wireless networks
2016	Bernhard Walke	For contributions to packet switching and relaying in cellular mobile system
2016	Jia Wang	For contributions to measurement and management of large operational networks
2016	Kaikit Wong	For contributions to multiuser communication systems
2016	Shugong Xu	For contributions to the improvement of wireless networks efficiency
2016	Zeng Bing	For contributions to image and video coding
2016	Jianzhong Zhang	For leadership in standardization of cellular systems
2016	Xi Zhang	For contributions to quality of service in mobile wireless networks
2017	Yong Liu	For contributions to multimedia networking
2017	Jiangzhou Wang	For contributions to multiple access and resource allocation in wireless mobile communications
2018	Earl McCune	For leadership in polar modulation circuits and signals
2018	Carla Chiasserini	For contributions to energy efficiency and cooperation in wireless networks
2018	Harald Haas	For leadership in the design of visible light and wireless communication systems
2018	Pan Hui	For contributions to social-based opportunistic networks
2018	Jie Lu	For contributions to wireless sensing
2018	Deepankar Medhi	For contributions to optimization and the design of computer-communication networks
2018	Jelena Mišić	For contributions to modeling and performance evaluation in wireless communications
2018	Hairong Qi	For contributions to collaborative signal processing in sensor networks
2018	Peiying Zhu	For leadership in wireless communications systems
2019	Sonia Aissa	For contributions to design and performance analysis of cognitive radio and cooperative communication systems
2019	Gabriella Bosco	For contributions to modeling and design of coherent optical communication systems
2019	Tao Jiang	For contributions to coding, modulation, and cognitive radio systems design
2019	Neelesh B. Mehta	For contributions to opportunistic selection in wireless communication systems
2019	Mikael Skoglund	For contributions to source-channel coding and wireless communications
2019	Meixia Tao	For contributions to resource allocation in broadband wireless networks
2019	Moustafa Youssef	for contributions to wireless location tracking technologies
2019	Zhang Ping	For leadership in theory, standardization, and application of wireless technologies
2020	Lin Cai	For contributions to topology control of wireless networks
2020	Yingying Chen	For contributions to mobile computing and mobile security
2020	Octavia Dobre	For contributions to the theory and practice of signal intelligence and emerging wireless technologies
2020	Rose Hu	For contributions to design and analysis of mobile wireless communications systems
2020	Yasamin Mostofi	For contributions to control and communications co-optimization in mobile sensor networks
2020	Ana Pérez-Neira	For contributions to signal processing for satellite communications and systems
2020	Dimitra Simeonidou	For contributions to optical networking systems and applications
2020	Jiang Xie	For contributions to mobility and resource management of wireless networks
2020	Ying Jun Zhang	For contributions to resource allocation and optimization in wireless communications
2021	Danijela Cabric	For contributions to theory and practice of spectrum sensing and cognitive radio systems
2021	Chih-Lin I	For leadership in wireless mobile networks
2021	Athina Markopoulou	For contributions to network coding systems and network measurement
2021	Ai-Chun Pang	For contributions to resource management and service provisioning for mobile edge networks
2021	Chiara Petrioli	For contributions to wireless and underwater networks
2021	Eve Schooler	For contributions to multimedia protocols and internet standards
2021	Daniela Tuninetti	For contributions to theory of repetition protocols and wireless interference management
2021	Honggang Wang	For contributions to low power wireless for IoT and multimedia applications
2022	Sujata Banerjee	For leadership in programmable and energy efficient networks
2022	Nada Golmie	For contributions to wireless technologies and standards
2022	Yusheng Ji	For contribution to distributed computing in mobile and dynamic systems
2022	Admela Jukan	For contributions to optical communications and networking
2022	Elif Uysal	For pioneering contributions to energy-efficient and low latency communications
2023	Houbing Song	For contributions to big data analytics and integration of AI with Internet of Things
2023	Kemal Akkaya	For contributions to routing and topology management in wireless ad hoc and sensor networks
2023	Maïté Brandt-Pearce	For contributions to optical wireless and fiber communications
2023	Natasha Devroye	For fundamental contributions to the theoretical understanding of cognitive, two-way, and relay networks
2023	Christina Lim	For contributions in hybrid fiber-wireless communications technology
2023	Jianping Wang	For contributions to resiliency of complex systems
2024	Min Dong	For contribution to transmission design and resource optimization for wireless communications
2024	Ana García Armada	For contributions to wireless communications transceivers
2024	Mingyan Liu	For contributions to modeling of wireless ad-hoc and sensor networks
2024	Mathini Sellathurai	For contributions to multi-user, multi-functional and multi-antenna wireless communications
2024	Lian Zhao	For contributions to modeling, performance analysis, and resource management of wireless networks
2025	Melike Erol-Kantarci	For contributions to AI-enabled wireless networks and smart grid communications
2025	Nuria González Prelcic	For contributions to millimeter wave wireless communications
2025	Zan Li	For contributions in theoretical foundations and system development of spectrum monitoring and cognition-based secure communications
2025	Lim Hyesook	For leadership in the field of information and communication technology
2025	Nalini Venkatasubramanian	For contributions to the foundations of adaptive software and its application in enhancing community safety
2025	Chuan Wu	For contributions to resource scheduling in cloud computing and distributed machine learning systems
2025	Yong Zeng	for contributions to unmanned aerial vehicle communications and wireless power transfer
2025	Liang Xiao	For contributions to learning based wireless security
2026	Lin X. Cai	For contributions to sustainable wireless communication and networking
2026	Sabrina De Capitani di Vimercati	For contributions to access control, security, and trust management
2026	Marla Dowell	For contributions to laser metrology and standards for optics and photonics
2026	Jinhong K. Guo	For contributions to signal processing and trust in secure communication systems
2026	Yingshu Li	For contributions to energy conservation and topology control in wireless networks
2026	Yuanqiu Luo	For contributions to the standardization of high-speed optical access protocols
2026	Ingrid Moerman	For contributions to experiment-driven wireless research
2026	Farhana Sheikh	For contributions to digital signal processing and 2.5D/3D heterogeneous integration
2026	Michèle Wigger	For contributions to feedback communication and caching
2026	Jing Yang	For contributions to the optimization of energy harvesting wireless communications and Age of Information
2026	Jianhua Zhang	For contributions to channel measurement, modeling theory, and standards of mobile communications

== See also ==
- List of IEEE Fellows
