= Elvino =

Elvino is a male given name. Notable people with the name include:

- Elvino de Brito (1851–1902), Portuguese military man
- Elvino Gargiulo (1925–2005), Italian serial killer
- Elvino Silveira Sousa, Canadian engineering professor
- Elvino Vardaro (1905–1971), Argentine tango composer and violinist
