= Zahavi =

Zahavi (Hebrew: זהבי) or Zehavi is one of the common Hebrew translations for the Ashkenazi Jewish last names Goldman, Goldstein, and Goldberg. It can refer to:

- Alex Zahavi (born 1991), American-born Israeli former footballer
- Amotz Zahavi and Avishag Zahavi, evolutionary biologists; Amotz theorized the handicap principle
- Dan Zahavi, Danish philosopher
- Ephraim Zehavi, Israeli engineer
- Eran Zahavi (born 1987), Israeli footballer
- Helen Zahavi, English author
- Pini Zahavi, Israeli football agent
