= Schreurs =

Schreurs is a Dutch occupational surname. It is derived via Schreuder from early Middle Dutch scrodere, which either was a tailor or a porter (carrier) (dock-worker, barrow-man). People with this surname include:

- Cesar Roel Schreurs (born 1941), Mexican rock and roll singer
- Danny Schreurs (born 1987), Dutch footballer
- Dominique Schreurs, Belgian microwave engineer
- Eric Schreurs (1958–2020), Dutch cartoonist
- Geerike Schreurs (born 1989), Dutch road cyclist
- Hamish Schreurs (born 1994), New Zealand road cyclist
- Harry Schreurs (1901–1973), Dutch footballer
- Jaap Schreurs (1913–1983), Dutch painter and graphic artist
- Leander Schreurs (born 1985), Dutch road cyclist
- Threes Schreurs (born 1959), Dutch novelist, theatre and film maker
