= Tanimoto =

Tanimoto (written: 谷本 or 谷元) is a Japanese surname. Notable people with the surname include:

- Ayumi Tanimoto (谷本 歩実; born 1981), Japanese judoka
- Keisuke Tanimoto (谷元 圭介; born 1985), Japanese baseball player
- Kiyoshi Tanimoto (谷本 清; 1909–1986), Japanese Methodist minister
- Larry Tanimoto (1945–2025), American politician
- Masanori Tanimoto (谷本 正憲; born 1945), Japanese politician
- Masayuki Tanimoto, Japanese engineer
- Mizuki Tanimoto (谷本 観月; born 1994), Japanese long distance runner
- Takayoshi Tanimoto (谷本 貴義; born 1975), Japanese singer
- Tatsuya Tanimoto (谷本 龍哉; born 1966), Japanese politician
