= Heismann =

Heismann may refer to:

- Heisman Trophy, American college football award
- Heisman (surname), includes Heismann
