= Gaurav Sharma =

Gaurav Sharma may refer to:

- Gaurav Sharma (engineer), American engineer
- Gaurav Sharma (politician) (born 1987), New Zealand doctor and former politician
- Gaurav Sharma (singer) (born 1992), Indian singer and composer
