= Peiying Zhu =

Chinese-Canadian communications engineer

Peiying Zhu is a communications engineer whose work has involved the development of 4G, 5G, and 6G cellular networks. Educated in China and Canada, she works in Canada as senior vice president of wireless research for Huawei.

== Education and career ==
Zhu has a master's degree from Southeast University in China, earned in 1985. She completed a Ph.D. at Concordia University in Canada in 1993. Her dissertation, Motion analysis from a sequence of range images, was jointly supervised by Tony Kasvand and Adam Krzyzak.

She worked for Nortel until 2009, becoming a Nortel Fellow and director of advanced wireless access technology. In 2009, she moved to Huawei, where she is Huawei Fellow and senior vice president of wireless research. She is also director for industry outreach in the IEEE Communications Society.

== Recognition ==
Zhu was elected as an IEEE Fellow, in the 2018 class of fellows, "for leadership in wireless communications systems". She is also a Fellow of the Canadian Academy of Engineering.
