= Deep Medhi =

Indo-American computer scientist and inventor

Deepankar Medhi
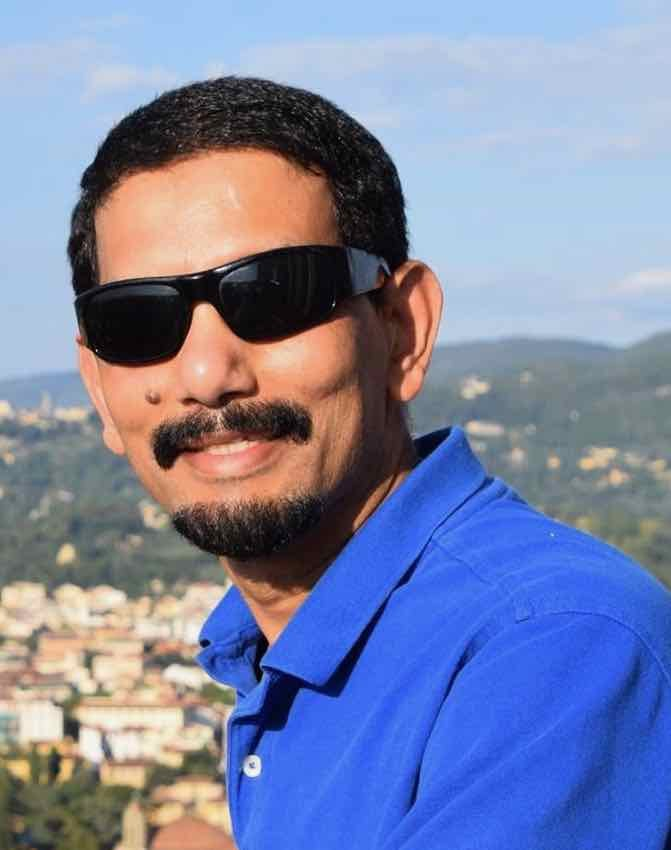
- Born: Guwahati, Assam, India
- Awards: Arne Jensen Lifetime Achievement Awards, 2025
- Scientific career
- Fields: Computer networking
- Institutions: University of Missouri–Kansas City

Deepankar (Deep) Medhi is an Indo-American computer scientist and inventor. He is a Program Director in the Computer & Network Systems (CNS) Division at the National Science Foundation (NSF). He worked as Curators' Distinguished Professor in the department of computer science and electrical engineering at the University of Missouri–Kansas City. He is a fellow of IEEE.

Prior to joining the University of Missouri–Kansas City, he worked as a technical officer at AT&T Bell Laboratories, routing and designing teletraffic networks. While at AT&T Bell Laboratories, he co-invented the Facility Diverse Routing system.

He is currently working as a program director in the computer and network systems (CNS) division of the National Science Foundation (NSF) in the United States.

== Birth and family ==
Deepankar Medhi was born in Guwahati in 1962. His father was statistician Jyotiprasad Medhi and his mother was Prity Medhi. His great-grandfather Kaliram Medhi is an Assamese writer.

== Book ==
- Network Routing: Algorithms, Protocols, and Architectures
- Routing, Flow, and Capacity Design in Communication and Computer Networks

== Honors and awards ==
- Arne Jensen Lifetime Achievement Awards, 2025
- Fellow, Institute of Electrical and Electronics Engineers (IEEE), 2018.
- N.T. Veatch Award for Distinguished Research and Creative Activity, UMKC, 2012.
- Chancellor's Award for Excellence in Graduate Mentoring, UMKC, 2012.
- Curators' Distinguished Professor Designation by the Board of Curators of the University of Missouri System, 2011.
- Kansas City Star's Tech 50 List, Summer 2002.
