= Nambirajan Seshadri =

Indian-American computer and electrical engineer

- Born: India
- Citizenship: United States (Naturalized)
- Education: National Institute of Technology, Tiruchirappalli (BE); Rensselaer Polytechnic Institute (MS, PhD)
- Occupations: Professor Of Practice, Electrical and Computer Engineering
- Organization: University of California, San Diego
- Awards: Alexander Graham Bell Medal (2018)

Nambirajan Seshadri is a professor of practice at the Department of Electrical and Computer Engineering, Jacobs School of Engineering, University of California, San Diego.

== Education ==
Seshadri completed his Bachelor of Engineering (B.E.) degree in Electronics and Communication Engineering from Regional Engineering College, Tiruchirappalli (now called as National Institute of Technology, Tiruchirappalli), India, in 1982. He obtained his Master of Science (M.S.) and Doctor of Philosophy (Ph.D.) degrees from Rensselaer Polytechnic Institute, United States, in 1984 and 1986 respectively.

== Career ==
After completing his PhD degree, Seshadri worked at AT&T Bell Laboratories as Member of Technical Staff and as Head of Communications Research at AT&T Shannon Labs for more than 13 years. After that, he worked in Broadcom for 16 years. In Broadcom, he served as the Chief Technology Officer (CTO) of Mobile and Wireless Business from 1999 to 2014 and Senior Vice President and CTO of Broadband and Connectivity Group from 2015 to 2016.

== Awards ==
He is a Fellow of IEEE, for contributions to theory and practice of reliable communications over wireless channels. He is a Member of the US National Academy of Engineering, Foreign Member of the Indian National Academy of Engineering, Distinguished alumnus of National Institute of Technology, Tiruchirapalli and holds about 200 patents. He is a co-recipient of the 1999 IEEE Information Theory best paper Award. In 2018, he was awarded the IEEE Alexander Graham Bell Medal.
