= Heisman (surname) =

Heisman or Heismann is a surname. Notable people with the name include:

- Crese Heismann (1880–1951), American baseball player
- Dan Heisman (born 1950), American chess player
- Fred Heismann, American electrical engineer
- John Heisman (1869–1936), American football and baseball coach, namesake of Heisman Trophy
