= Gabriella Bosco =

Italian engineer and Editor-in-Chief of the Journal of Lightwave Technology

- Born: 1973 (age 52–53); Ivrea, Italy
- Education: Politecnico di Torino
- Awards: Journal of Lightwave Technology Best Paper Award IEEE Photonics Society Distinguished Service Award
- Scientific career
- Fields: Optical communication
- Workplaces: IEEE Photonics Society, Politecnico di Torino
- Website: https://www.optcom.polito.it/people/full-professor/gabriella-bosco

Gabriella Bosco (born 1973) is an Italian engineer and professor at the Department of Electronics and Telecommunications of the Polytechnic University of Turin. She is the current President of the IEEE Photonics Society (2026-2027), and a Fellow of the Optical Society of America and the Institute of Electrical and Electronics Engineers.

== Education ==
Bosco completed her Ph.D. in electronic communication engineering at the Polytechnic University of Turin in 2002. She was a visiting researcher in Professor Daniel Blumenthal's group at the University of California, Santa Barbara in 2000 during her doctoral studies.

== Research and career ==
Bosco stayed at the Polytechnic University of Turin to pursue her postdoctoral research as part of the optical communications group, where she was appointed as an assistant professor in 2011 and associate professor since 2014. From 2015 to 2019, she was also a member of the Academic Senate of the Polytechnic University of Turin.

She is now a full professor in the Department of Electronics and Telecommunications, where her research is focused on optical transmission systems working on their design and performance analysis, as well as applying digital signal processing methods to optical links. Bosco has also worked on research projects funded by industrial partners such as Huawei, Cisco Systems, Telecom Italia, and the European Space Agency.

Bosco has co-authored more than 200 peer-reviewed articles, as well as several book chapters. She is currently the President of the IEEE Photonics Society.

From 2019 to 2024 she served as editor-in-chief of the IEEE/OSA Journal of Lightwave Technology, after previously serving as associate editor from 2014 to 2017 and as deputy editor in 2018.

== Awards and honours ==
Bosco and co-authors were awarded the IEEE/OSA Journal of Lightwave Technology Best Paper Award in 2014 and 2015, for the papers "On the Performance of Nyquist-WDM Terabit Superchannels Based on PM-BPSK, PM-QPSK, PM-8QAM or PM-16QAM Subcarriers" (2011) and "Mode-Division Multiplexing Over 96 km of Few-Mode Fiber Using Coherent 6x6 MIMO Processing" (2012). The award recognises top-cited papers that have been published in the Journal two or three years preceding the award.

She was elected as Fellow of The Optical Society in 2017 and the Institute of Electrical and Electronics Engineers in 2019, for her "pioneering contributions to the modeling and design of coherent optical communication systems".

In 2024 she received the IEEE Photonics Society Distinguished Service Award for “dedicated service to the Photonics Society with exceptional contributions to Publications and Conferences”.
