= Lian Zhao =

Canadian electrical engineer

Lian Zhao (born 1969) is a Chinese and Canadian electrical engineer whose research interests include wireless communication and resource management for mobile edge computing. She is a professor in the Department of Electrical, Computer, and Biomedical Engineering at Toronto Metropolitan University.

== Education and career ==
After a 1990 bachelor's degree from the Civil Aviation University of China and a 1993 master's degree from Wuhan University, Zhao worked as an engineer in civil aviation for five years before changing to an academic career track.

She received a Ph.D. in electrical and computer engineering from the University of Waterloo in 2002, with the dissertation Error and Power Control Techniques for DS-CDMA Systems with Applications supervised by Jon W. Mark. She joined Toronto Metropolitan University (then named Ryerson University) in 2003. She was tenured as an associate professor in 2006, and became a full professor in 2014.

== Recognition ==
Zhao has been a Distinguished Lecturer of the IEEE Communication Society and of the IEEE Vehicular Technology Society. She was elected as an IEEE Fellow in the 2024 class of fellows, "for contributions to modeling, performance analysis, and resource management of wireless networks".
