= Ingrid Moerman =

Belgian electrical engineer

Ingrid Moerman (born 1965) is a Belgian electrical engineer whose research focuses on wireless networking, including software-defined radio, cognitive radio, body area networks, and vehicular ad hoc networks. She splits her work between a professorship in the Faculty of Engineering and Architecture at Ghent University, and a staff researcher position in the Internet & Data Lab of imec, a Belgian research and development hub for digital technologies.

== Education and career ==
Moerman was a student of electrical engineering at Ghent University, where she received an engineering degree in 1987 and completed her Ph.D. in 1992.

She became an assistant professor (docent) at Ghent University in 2000, an associate professor (hoofdocent) in 2003, and a full professor (hoogleraar) in 2009. She is also president of the board of directors of ASTRID, the national emergency communications system of Belgium.

== Recognition ==
Moerman was named to the 2026 class of IEEE Fellows, "for contributions to experiment-driven wireless research".
