= Ying Jun Zhang =

Chinese electrical engineer

- Education: Fudan University; Hong Kong University of Science and Technology
- Engineering career
- Institutions: Chinese University of Hong Kong

Angela Ying Jun Zhang (Chinese: 張穎珺) is a Chinese electrical engineer specializing in wireless networks, smart grids, and edge computing. She is a professor in the Department of Information Engineering at the Chinese University of Hong Kong.

== Education and career ==
Zhang has a bachelor's degree from Fudan University, and a PhD from the Hong Kong University of Science and Technology, completed in 2004. She took her present position in Information Engineering at the Chinese University of Hong Kong in 2005.

In 2018, she became founding chair of the Smart Grid Communications Technical Committee of the IEEE Communications Society. She was editor-in-chief of the IEEE Open Journal of the Communications Society from 2022 to 2023.

== Recognition ==
In 2006, Zhang won the Hong Kong Young Scientist Award of the Hong Kong Institution of Science, in the Engineering Science category. Zhang was elected as a Fellow of the Institution of Engineering and Technology in 2016, and as an IEEE Fellow, in the 2020 class of fellows, "for contributions to resource allocation and optimization in wireless communications". She is also a Distinguished Lecturer of the IEEE Communications Society.
