= Shengli Zhou =

Professor of Electrical and Computer Engineering

Shengli Zhou is a professor of electrical and computer engineering at the University of Connecticut. He was named Fellow of the Institute of Electrical and Electronics Engineers (IEEE) in 2014 for contributions to wireless and underwater acoustic communications.
