= Adam Krzyzak =

Computer engineer

Adam Krzyzak is a computer engineer from Concordia University in Montreal, Quebec. He was named a Fellow of the Institute of Electrical and Electronics Engineers (IEEE) in 2012 for his contributions to nonparametric algorithms and classification systems for machine learning.
