= Subhabrata Sen =

Electrical engineer

Subhabrata Sen is an electrical engineer at AT&T Labs Research in Bedminster, New Jersey. He was named a Fellow of the Institute of Electrical and Electronics Engineers (IEEE) in 2016 for his contributions to analysis of cross-layer interactions in cellular networks.
