= Yong Liu =

American electrical engineer

Yong Liu from the Fairchild Semiconductor Corporation, South Portland, Maine was named Fellow of the Institute of Electrical and Electronics Engineers (IEEE) in 2015 for contributions in power electronics packaging.
