= Hitoshi Kiya =

Electrical engineer

Hitoshi Kiya from the Tokyo Metropolitan University, Tokyo, Japan was named Fellow of the Institute of Electrical and Electronics Engineers (IEEE) in 2016 for contributions to filter structure, data hiding, and multimedia security.
