= Farhana Sheikh (engineer) =

Canadian-American electronics engineer

Farhana Sheikh is a Canadian and American electronics engineer for Intel, where her work involves digital signal processing, 2.5D integrated circuit and three-dimensional integrated circuit packaging, chiplets, and die-to-die interconnections.

== Education and career ==
Sheikh has a 1993 bachelor's degree in engineering from Carleton University in Canada, and a 1996 master's degree from the University of California, Berkeley. She returned to Berkeley for a 2008 Ph.D., supervised by Borivoje Nikolić and supported by an Intel PhD Fellowship.

She has worked for Intel Labs, the Intel Programmable Solutions Group (formerly Altera), and since 2025, for Intel Government Technologies.

== Recognition ==
Sheikh is a Distinguished Lecturer of the IEEE Solid-State Circuits Society. She was elected as an IEEE Fellow in 2026, "for contributions to digital signal processing and 2.5D/3D heterogeneous integration".
