= Xiaoli Ma =

Xiaoli Ma from the Georgia Institute of Technology, Atlanta, GA was named Fellow of the Institute of Electrical and Electronics Engineers (IEEE) in 2016 for contributions to block transmissions over wireless fading channels.

== Education ==
Dr. Ma received the B.S. degree in Automatic Control from Tsinghua University, Beijing, China in 1998. The M.S. degree in Electrical Engineering from the University of Virginia in 2000, and the Ph.D. degree in Electrical Engineering from the University of Minnesota in 2003.
