= Pooi-Yuen Kam =

Malaysian scientist, professor of CUHK-Shenzhen

- 甘培潤
- Born: Ipoh, Malaysia
- Education: MIT (B.S., M.S., Ph.D.)
- Scientific career
- Fields: Mathematics and Applied Mathematics; Electrical Engineering; Communication theory and systems; Artificial Intelligence and Robotics
- Institutions: Bell Telephone Laboratories (1976 - 1978); National University of Singapore(1978 - 2019); The Chinese University of Hong Kong, Shenzhen (2019 - present)

Pooi-Yuen Kam (Chinese: 甘培潤), is an Emeritus Professor of National University of Singapore and currently a professor at the School of Science and Engineering, the Chinese University of Hong Kong, Shenzhen. He was elected a Fellow of the IEEE for his contributions to receiver design and performance analysis for wireless communications. He is also a Fellow of the AAIA (Asia-Pacific Artificial Intelligence Association) and a Fellow of the IES (Institution of Engineers, Singapore).

== Early life and education ==
Kam was born in Ipoh, Malaysia, where he was educated before entering college. He received S.B., S.M., and Ph.D. degrees in electrical engineering from the Massachusetts Institute of Technology (MIT), USA, in 1972, 1973, and 1976, respectively.

== Career ==
After graduating from MIT, Kam worked at the Bell Telephone Laboratories as a member of technical staff, where he was engaged in packet network studies. Since 1978, he has been a professor at the Department of Electrical and Computer Engineering (ECE), National University of Singapore (NUS) for over forty years, where he served as the Deputy Dean of Engineering and the Vice Dean for Academic Affairs of the Faculty of Engineering from 2000 to 2003.

In 2019, Kam became an emeritus Professor of NUS after he retired from the ECE Department. Thereafter, he joined the Chinese University of Hong Kong, Shenzhen, where he served as Associate Dean for Student Affairs in the School of Science and Engineering, and currently teaches mainly undergraduate calculus.
