= Stefano Galli =

American electrical engineer

Stefano Galli is an electrical engineer working for ASSIA, Inc. in Redwood City, California. He was named a Fellow of the Institute of Electrical and Electronics Engineers (IEEE) in 2012 for his contributions to the theory, practice, and standardization of power line communication networks.
