= Erchin Serpedin =

American electrical engineer

Erchin Serpedin is a professor from Texas A&M University in College Station, Texas. He was named a Fellow of the Institute of Electrical and Electronics Engineers (IEEE) in 2013. He has served as technical chair or co-chair for nine major conferences and symposia, and as associate editor or member of editorial board for 14 journals. His professional service has included appointments as associate editor for journals such as IEEE Transactions on Information Theory, IEEE Communications Letters, IEEE Signal Processing Letters, IEEE Transactions on Communications, IEEE Transactions on Signal Processing, IEEE Transactions on Wireless Communications, IEEE Signal Processing Magazine, EURASIP Journal on Advances in Signal Processing, Signal Processing (Elsevier), and Physical Communication (Elsevier). From 2014 to 2017, he served as Editor-in-Chief of the EURASIP Journal on Bioinformatics and Systems Biology, an online journal published by Springer Nature. He has also served as lead or guest editor for eight journal special issues.

Serpedin has received 12 Best Paper Awards at international conferences, the 2018 IEEE Signal Processing Magazine Best Column Award, and the 2026 IEEE Systems Journal Best Paper Award. He has authored four research monographs, one textbook, 250 journal papers, 350 conference papers, and 18 book chapters.

His research interests include signal processing, machine learning, and artificial intelligence, with applications in biomedical engineering, cybersecurity of smart grids and transportation networks, and computational materials science.

He has served as ECEN Program Chair at Texas A&M University at Qatar and is a tenured professor in the Department of Electrical and Computer Engineering at Texas A&M University in College Station.
