= Cecilia Metra =

Electrical engineer

Cecilia Metra is an electrical engineer at the University of Bologna in Italy. She was named a Fellow of the Institute of Electrical and Electronics Engineers (IEEE) in 2014 "for her contributions to the online testing and fault-tolerant design of digital circuits and systems".

Metra served as president of the IEEE Computer Society for 2019.
