= Rose Hu =

Electrical engineer

Rose Qingyang Hu (Chinese: 胡清阳; pinyin: Hú Qīngyáng) is an electrical engineer who is currently a professor and the Department Head of the Virginia Tech Bradley Department of Electrical & Computer Engineering. Her research involves wireless networks and their applications in edge computing and the internet of things.

== Education and career ==
Hu studied electrical engineering at the University of Science and Technology of China, graduating in 1992. After a 1995 master's degree from the Brooklyn Polytechnic Institute (now the New York University Tandon School of Engineering), she completed a Ph.D. in 1998 at the University of Kansas. Her dissertation, Development and analysis of ABR congestion control techniques for wide area ATM networks, was supervised by David Petr.

After working for Nortel and Yotta Networks, she became an assistant professor of electrical and computer engineering at Mississippi State University in 2002, but returned to industry in 2004, working for Nortel again from 2004 to 2009, for Research In Motion from 2009 to 2010, and for Intel in 2010.

In 2011 she took a position at Utah State University as an untenured associate professor and was granted tenure in 2014. She was promoted to full professor in 2017 and named associate dean for research in 2018.

On January 1, 2025 she took her current position as Department Head of the Bradley Department of Electrical & Computer Engineering at Virginia Tech.

== Books ==
Hu is the coauthor of books including:

- Heterogeneous Cellular Networks (with Yi Qian, Wiley, 2013)
- Resource Management for Heterogeneous Networks in LTE Systems (with Yi Qian, Springer, 2014)
- Smart Grid Communication Infrastructures: Big Data, Cloud Computing, And Security (with Feng Ye and Yi Qian, Wiley, 2018)
- Cybersecurity in Intelligent Networking Systems (with Shengjie Xu and Yi Qian, Wiley, 2022)

== Recognition ==
Hu was a distinguished lecturer of the IEEE Communications Society from 2015 to 2018, and of the IEEE Vehicular Technology Society from 2020 to 2022. She was named an IEEE Fellow, in the 2020 class of fellows, "for contributions to design and analysis of mobile wireless communications systems".

In 2023, Hu was elected as a Fellow of the American Association for the Advancement of Science.
