= Yunhao Liu =

Chinese computer scientist

- 刘云浩
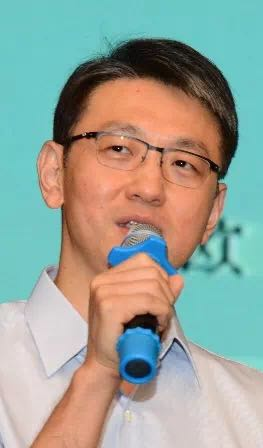
- Yunhao Liu
- Born: 1971 (age 54–55); Beijing, China
- Citizenship: People's Republic of China
- Education: Michigan State University (Ph.D. & M.S.); Beijing Foreign Studies University (M.A.); Tsinghua University (B.S.)
- Known for: LANDMARC; GreenOrbs; Tagoram; CitySee
- Awards: ACM Fellow; IEEE Fellow; State Natural Science Award; ACM Presidential Award; MSU Foundation Professor; NSF China Distinguished Young Scholar; CCF IOT Young Achievement Award; Hong Kong Best Innovation and Research Award
- Scientific career
- Fields: Internet of Things; Wireless sensor networks; Pervasive computing; Peer-to-peer Computing; Wireless Localization
- Workplaces: Michigan State University; Tsinghua University

Yunhao Liu is a Chinese computer scientist. He is the Dean of Global Innovation Exchange (GIX) at Tsinghua University.

Liu was named Fellow of the Association for Computing Machinery (ACM) in 2015 for contributions to sensor networks and Fellow of the Institute of Electrical and Electronics Engineers (IEEE) in 2015 for contributions to wireless sensor networks and systems.

He is the editor-in-chief of ACM Transactions on Sensor Network and is the Honorary Chair of the ACM China Council.

== Biography ==
Yunhao Liu received his B.S. degree from Automation Department at Tsinghua University in 1995, an M.A. degree from Graduate School of Translation and Interpreting at Beijing Foreign Studies University in 1997, and an M.S. and Ph.D. degree from Department of Computer Science and Engineering at Michigan State University in 2003 and 2004.

From 2004 to 2011, he was assistant professor, associate professor, and postgraduate director in the Department of Computer Science and Engineering, Hong Kong University of Science and Technology (HKUST). He was Professor in School of Information Science and Technology at Tsinghua University 2011 through 2013, and he served as Chang Jiang Professor and the Dean of School of Software, Tsinghua University, 2013 to 2017. From 2018, he joined MSU and now serves as MSU Foundation Professor, and from 2018 to 2019, he served as chairperson designee in the Department of Computer Science and Engineering, Michigan State University.

== Honors and awards ==
Yunhao received Hong Kong Best Innovation & Research Grand Award for building the world's earliest Coal Mine Surveillance with Wireless Sensor Networks in 2007. He received the First Class Ministry of Education Nature Science Award for Location and Localizability study in wireless networks in 2010.

In 2011, Liu was awarded the State Natural Science Award for his contribution to wireless localization theory and practice. In the same year, he also received one of the five Distinguished Young Scholar Awards in Computer Science by National Natural Science Foundation of China. In 2013, Liu was named the ACM Presidential Award for his contribution to spreading the word and shared the value that ACM offers to China's vast computing community.

In 2014, the 20th Annual International Conference on Mobile Computing and Networking (ACM MobiCom) awards the best paper award to Liu's group for their paper Tagoram: Real-Time Tracking of Mobile RFID Tags to High Precision Using COTS Devices. Yunhao and his students designed and developed Tagoram, and successfully deployed this system in Terminal One, Beijing Capital International Airport and Sanya Phoenix International Airport. The prototype ran over a year and consumed 110,000 RFID tags involving 53 destination airports, 93 airlines, and 1,094 flights. Based on the observation that the tag diversity is the key to the localization performance, they designed and implemented Differential Augmented Hologram (DAH) localization scheme, which successfully eliminated the impact of tag diversity on the localization accuracy, and improved the localization performance to millimeter-level, which was 40 times better than the state-of-the-art. The Tagoram system also won the Gold Award in Soft China Forum 2013, which is the highest honor in Chinese Software industry. It was the first time that the conference awards its highest award to an Asian institution.

In 2015, Liu was named Fellow of the Association for Computing Machinery (ACM) for contributions to sensor networks, and Fellow of the Institute of Electrical and Electronics Engineers (IEEE) for contributions to wireless sensor networks and systems.

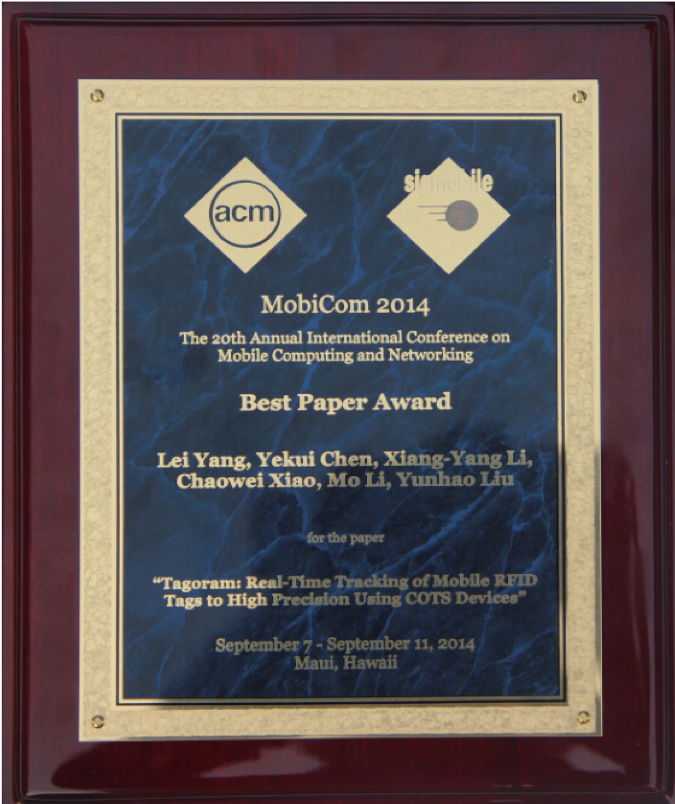
MobiCom 2014 Best paper award

In 2016, Liu was awarded the IOT Young Achievement Award for his contribution to the Internet of Things by China Computer Federation.

In 2017, Liu was named CSE Distinguished Alumni by Michigan State University.

In 2018, Liu was named MSU Foundation Professor by Michigan State University.

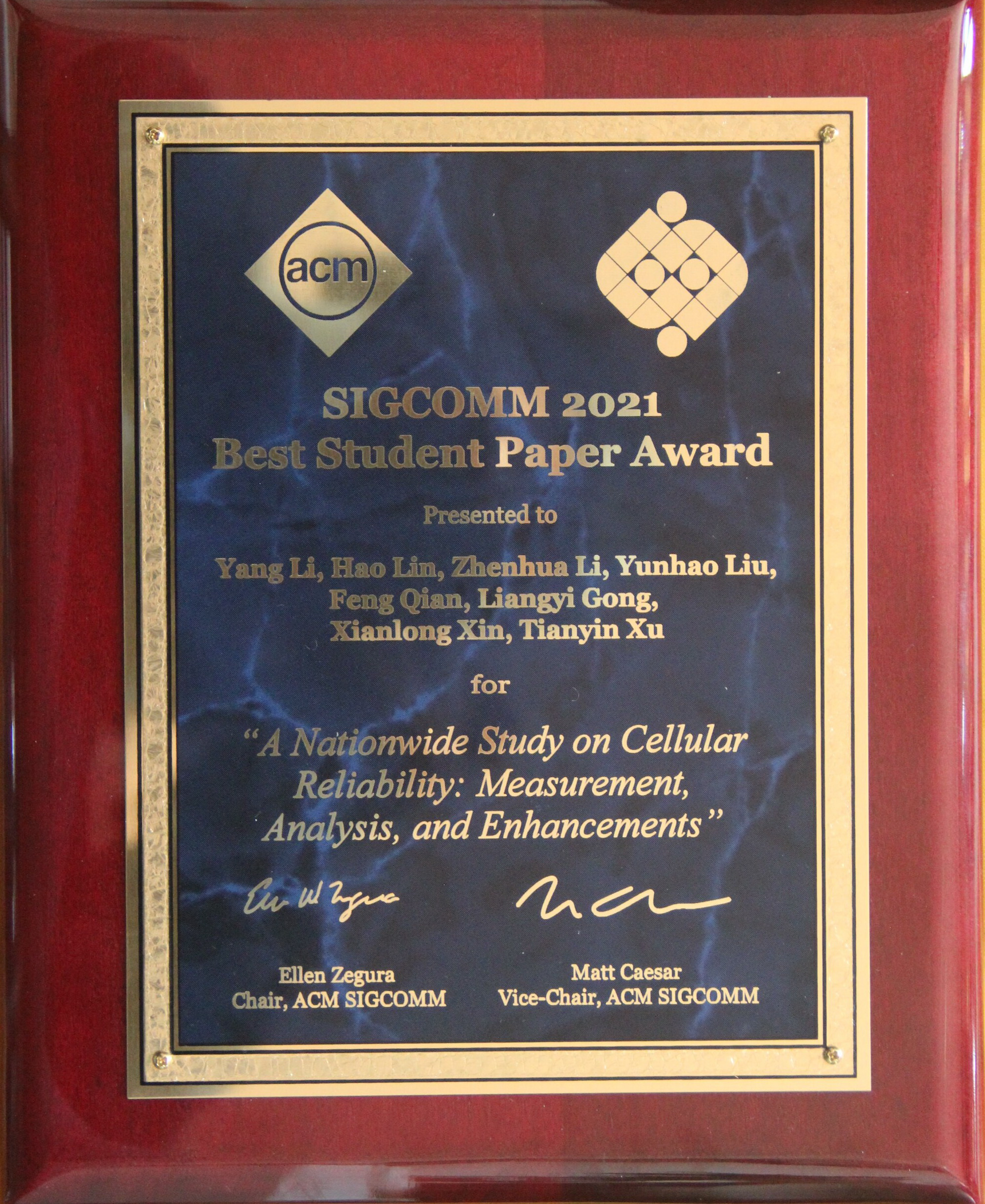
SIGCOMM 2021 Best Student Paper Award

In 2021, Liu was awarded the Best Student Paper Award of SIGCOMM 2021, and the Best Paper of Sensys 2021.

== Notable publications ==
Books:

- Liu, Yunhao, and Zheng Yang. Location, localization, and localizability: location-awareness technology for wireless networks. Springer Science & Business Media, 2010.
- Liu, Yunhao. "Introduction to internet of things." Beijing. The Science Press, 2010.

Selected journal articles:

- Lionel, M. N., Liu, Y., Lau, Y. C., & Patil, A. P. (2004). LANDMARC: indoor location sensing using active RFID. Wireless networks, 10(6), 701-710.
- Yang, Z., Zhou, Z., & Liu, Y. (2013). From RSSI to CSI: Indoor localization via channel response. ACM Computing Surveys, 46(2), 25.
- Wu, C., Yang, Z., Liu, Y., & Xi, W. (2012). WILL: Wireless indoor localization without site survey. IEEE Transactions on Parallel and Distributed Systems, 24(4), 839-848.
- Li, M., & Liu, Y. (2009). Underground coal mine monitoring with wireless sensor networks. ACM Transactions on Sensor Networks (TOSN), 5(2), 10.
- Li, M., & Liu, Y. (2010). Rendered path: range-free localization in anisotropic sensor networks with holes. IEEE/ACM Transactions on Networking (ToN), 18(1), 320-332.
- Liu, Y., He, Y., Li, M., Wang, J., Liu, K., & Li, X. (2012). Does wireless sensor network scale? A measurement study on GreenOrbs. IEEE Transactions on Parallel and Distributed Systems, 24(10), 1983-1993.
- Liu, Y., Liu, K., & Li, M. (2010). Passive diagnosis for wireless sensor networks. IEEE/ACM Transactions on Networking (TON), 18(4), 1132-1144.
- Yang, Z., & Liu, Y. (2009). Quality of trilateration: Confidence-based iterative localization. IEEE Transactions on Parallel and Distributed Systems, 21(5), 631-640.
- Liu, Y., Xiao, L., Liu, X., Ni, L. M., & Zhang, X. (2005). Location awareness in unstructured peer-to-peer systems. IEEE Transactions on Parallel and Distributed Systems, 16(2), 163-174.
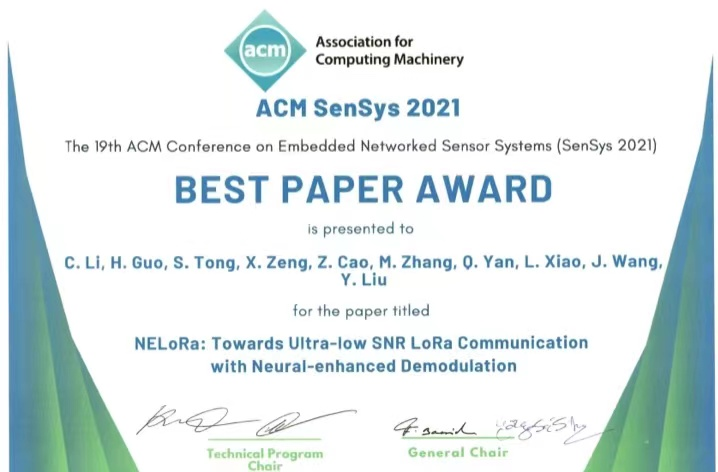
- Sensys 2021 Best Paper Award
  Liu, Y., Zhao, Y., Chen, L., Pei, J., & Han, J. (2011). Mining frequent trajectory patterns for activity monitoring using radio frequency tag arrays. IEEE Transactions on Parallel and Distributed Systems, 23(11), 2138-2149.
- Yang, Z., & Liu, Y. (2011). Understanding node localizability of wireless ad hoc and sensor networks. IEEE Transactions on Mobile Computing, 11(8), 1249-1260.
- Dong, D., Li, M., Liu, Y., Li, X. Y., & Liao, X. (2011). Topological detection on wormholes in wireless ad hoc and sensor networks. IEEE/ACM Transactions on Networking (TON), 19(6), 1787-1796.
- Liu, Y., Xiao, L., & Ni, L. (2007). Building a scalable bipartite P2P overlay network. IEEE Transactions on Parallel and distributed systems, 18(9), 1296-1306.
- Liu, Y., Mao, X., He, Y., Liu, K., Gong, W., & Wang, J. (2013). CitySee: Not only a wireless sensor network. IEEE Network, 27(5), 42-47.
- Yin, Z., Wu, C., Yang, Z., & Liu, Y. (2017). Peer-to-peer indoor navigation using smartphones. IEEE Journal on Selected Areas in Communications, 35(5), 1141-1153.
- Qian, K., Wu, C., Yang, Z., Liu, Y., He, F., & Xing, T. (2018). Enabling contactless detection of moving humans with dynamic speeds using CSI. ACM Transactions on Embedded Computing Systems (TECS), 17(2), 52.
- Zhou, Z., Shangguan, L., Zheng, X., Yang, L., & Liu, Y. (2017). Design and implementation of an RFID-based customer shopping behavior mining system. IEEE/ACM transactions on networking, 25(4), 2405-2418.
- Yang, L., Li, Y., Lin, Q., Jia, H., Li, X. Y., & Liu, Y. (2017). Tagbeat: Sensing mechanical vibration period with COTS RFID systems. IEEE/ACM Transactions on Networking (TON), 25(6), 3823-3835.
- Ma, Q., Zhang, S., Zhu, T., Liu, K., Zhang, L., He, W., & Liu, Y. (2016). PLP: Protecting location privacy against correlation analyze attack in crowdsensing. IEEE transactions on mobile computing, 16(9), 2588-2598.
- Duan, C., Yang, L., Lin, Q., & Liu, Y. (2018). Tagspin: High accuracy spatial calibration of RFID antennas via spinning tags. IEEE Transactions on Mobile Computing, 17(10), 2438-2451.

Selected conference articles:

- Yang, Q., Li, Z., Liu, Y., Long, H., Huang, Y., He, J., ... & Zhai, E. Mobile Gaming on Personal Computers with Direct Android Emulation. In Proceedings of ACM MobiCom 2019.
- Yan, Y., Li, Z., Chen, Q. A., Wilson, C., Xu, T., Zhai, E., ... & Liu, Y. Understanding and Detecting Overlay-based Android Malware at Market Scales. In Proceedings of ACM MobiSys 2019.
- Xiao, A., Liu, Y., Li, Y., Qian, F., Li, Z., Bai, S., ... & Xin, X. An In-depth Study of Commercial MVNO: Measurement and Optimization. In Proceedings of ACM MobiSys 2019.
- Dang, F., Li, Z., Liu, Y., Zhai, E., Chen, Q. A., Xu, T., ... & Yang, J. Understanding Fileless Attacks on Linux-based IoT Devices with HoneyCloud. In Proceedings of ACM MobiSys 2019.
- Zheng, Y., Zhang, Y., Qian, K., Zhang, G., Liu, Y., Wu, C., & Yang, Z. Zero-Effort Cross-Domain Gesture Recognition with Wi-Fi. In Proceedings of ACM MobiSys 2019.
- Zhang, K., Wu, C., Yang, C., Zhao, Y., Huang, K., Peng, C., ... & Yang, Z. ChromaCode: A Fully Imperceptible Screen-Camera Communication System. In Proceedings of ACM MobiCom 2018.
- Qian, K., Wu, C., Zhang, Y., Zhang, G., Yang, Z., & Liu, Y. Widar2.0: Passive human tracking with a single wi-fi link. In Proceedings of ACM MobiSys 2018.
- Liu, C., Zhang, L., Liu, Z., Liu, K., Li, X., & Liu, Y. Lasagna: towards deep hierarchical understanding and searching over mobile sensing data. In Proceedings of ACM MobiCom 2016.
- Yang, L., Li, Y., Lin, Q., Li, X. Y., & Liu, Y. Making sense of mechanical vibration period with sub-millisecond accuracy using backscatter signals. In Proceedings of ACM MobiCom 2016.
- Yang, L., Lin, Q., Li, X., Liu, T., & Liu, Y. See through walls with cots rfid system!. In Proceedings of ACM MobiCom 2015.
- Zhang, L., Bo, C., Hou, J., Li, X. Y., Wang, Y., Liu, K., & Liu, Y. Kaleido: You can watch it but cannot record it. In Proceedings of ACM MobiCom 2015.
- Shangguan, L., Yang, Z., Liu, A. X., Zhou, Z., & Liu, Y. Relative Localization of RFID Tags using Spatial-Temporal Phase Profiling. In Proceedings of USENIX NSDI 2015.
- Zhu, T., Ma, Q., Zhang, S., & Liu, Y. Context-free attacks using keyboard acoustic emanations. In Proceedings of ACM CCS 2014.
- Yang, L., Chen, Y., Li, X. Y., Xiao, C., Li, M., & Liu, Y. Tagoram: Real-time tracking of mobile RFID tags to high precision using COTS devices. In Proceedings of ACM MobiCom 2014. [Best Paper Award]
- Zhang, L., Li, X. Y., Huang, W., Liu, K., Zong, S., Jian, X., ... & Liu, Y. It starts with igaze: Visual attention driven networking with smart glasses. In Proceedings of ACM MobiCom 2014.
- Yang, Z., Wu, C., & Liu, Y. Locating in fingerprint space: wireless indoor localization with little human intervention. In Proceedings of ACM MobiCom 2012.
- Mo, L., He, Y., Liu, Y., Zhao, J., Tang, S. J., Li, X. Y., & Dai, G. Canopy closure estimates with greenorbs: Sustainable sensing in the forest. In Proceedings of ACM SenSys 2009.
- Yang, Z., Liu, Y., & Li, X. Y. Beyond trilateration: On the localizability of wireless ad-hoc networks. In Proceedings of IEEE INFOCOM 2009.
- Li, M., & Liu, Y. Underground structure monitoring with wireless sensor networks. In Proceedings ACM IPSN 2007.
- Liao, X., Jin, H., Liu, Y., Ni, L. M., & Deng, D. Anysee: Peer-to-peer live streaming. In Proceedings of IEEE INFOCOM 2006.
- Liu, Y., Liu, X., Xiao, L., Ni, L. M., & Zhang, X. Location-aware topology matching in P2P systems. In Proceedings of IEEE INFOCOM 2004.

== Professional services ==
Editor for:

- ACM Transactions on Sensor Network (editor-in-chief, 2017–present)
- IEEE/ACM Transactions on Networking (associate editor, 2012-2016)
- IEEE Transactions on Parallel and Distributed Systems (associate editors-in-chief, 2011-2015)
- Tsinghua Science and Technology (associate editor-in-chief)

Program committee member for:

- IEEE INFOCOM 2006, 2007, 2008, 2009, 2010, 2011, 2012, 2013, 2014, 2015, 2016, 2017, 2018, 2019, 2020
- IEEE ICDCS 2006, 2007, 2008, 2009, 2010, 2011, 2012, 2013, 2014, 2015, 2016, 2018
- ACM MobiCom 2009, 2010, 2011, 2012, 2015, 2018, 2019, 2020

Chair for:

- IEEE INFOCOM 2020 (PC Co-Chair)
- ACM EWSN 2019 (General Co-Chair)
- ACM TURC 2017-2019 (General Co-Chair)
- Microsoft 21 Century Computing 2015 (General Co-Chair)
- IEEE TrustCom 2014 (PC Chair)
- IEEE RTAS 2012 (General Chair)
- IEEE MASS 2011 (PC Chair)
- IEEE ICDCS 2010, 2012 (PC Vice Chair)
- WWW 2008 (General Vice Chair)
