= Xiqi Gao =

Electrical engineer

This is a Chinese name; the family name is Gao.

Xiqi Gao (born March, 1967) is currently the deputy director of the State Key Laboratory for Mobile Communications and member of the Academic Committee of Southeast University in Nanjing, China.

Gao received the 2011 IEEE Communications Society Stephen O. Rice Prize in the field of communications theory for his paper titled "MIMO Multichannel Beamforming: SER and Outage Using New Eigenvalue Distributions of Complex Noncentral Wishart Matrices". The paper was co-authored with Prof. Matthew McKay, Shi Jin, and Iain B. Collings.

The paper contributed to research on multiple-antenna wireless communication systems that enables a high rate of information to be sent across the world without any additional power or bandwidth.

He was named a Fellow of the Institute of Electrical and Electronics Engineers (IEEE) in 2015 for contributions to broadband wireless communications and multirate signal processing.
