= Jelena Mišić =

Yugoslav-Canadian computer scientist

- Education: University of Belgrade
- Occupation: Computer Engineer
- Awards: Fellow of the IEEE
- Scientific career
- Workplaces: Toronto Metropolitan University; University of Manitoba; Hong Kong University of Science and Technology

Jelena Mišić is a Yugoslav-Canadian computer scientist specializing in wireless networking, mobile computing, cloud computing, blockchain-based data recording, and cryptocurrency. She is a professor of computer science at Toronto Metropolitan University. She received her PhD in computer engineering from University of Belgrade in 1986.

Before joining Ryerson University (now Toronto Metropolitan University), she was with University of Manitoba and Hong Kong University of Science and Technology. She has authored or coauthored four books and more than 300 papers in journals and conference proceedings in the area of computer networks and security. In 2018, she was elected Fellow of the Institute of Electrical and Electronics Engineers "for contributions to modeling and performance evaluation in wireless communications."
