= Elvino de Brito =

Portuguese politician (1851–1902)

Elvino José de Sousa e Brito (Goa, Portuguese India, 19 May 1851 - Lisbon, 17 August 1902) was a military man, engineer, administrator, teacher and Portuguese politician. He was civil governor of Faro, between 1 October 1889 and 27 January 1890, and Minister of Public Works, Trade and Industry, between 18 August 1898 and 25 June 1900, in XLIX Monarchial Constitutional Government of José Luciano de Castro.
