= Jing Yang (computer engineer) =

Chinese-American wireless communications engineer

Jing Yang is a Chinese and American computer engineer specializing in wireless communication and known for her research on energy harvesting for wireless devices. Her research interests also include machine learning and information theory. She is an associate professor of electrical and computer engineering at the University of Virginia, with a courtesy appointment as associate professor of computer science.

== Education and career ==
Despite pressure from her family not to go into STEM fields, Yang studied electrical engineering as an undergraduate at the University of Science and Technology of China. She went to the University of Maryland, College Park for graduate study; after a master's degree there, she completed her Ph.D. in 2010. Her doctoral dissertation, Delay Minimization in Energy Constrained Wireless Communications, was supervised by Sennur Ulukus.

After her doctorate, Yang became a postdoctoral researcher at the University of Wisconsin–Madison. She became an assistant professor at the University of Arkansas, and then in 2016 an assistant professor of electrical engineering and computer science at the Pennsylvania State University. By 2024, she was an associate professor at Pennsylvania State, before she moved to her present position at the University of Virginia.

== Recognition ==
In 2020 and 2021, Yang was included in the N2Women list of "Stars in Computer Networking and Communications", and given the Women in Communications Engineering Early Achievement Award of the IEEE Communications Society. Yang was named to the 2026 class of IEEE Fellows, "for contributions to the optimization of energy harvesting wireless communications and Age of Information".
