= Georgios Ginis =

American electrical engineer

Georgios Ginis (1975 – 25 September 2025) was an electrical engineer with ASSIA, Inc. in San Mateo, California. He was named a Fellow of the Institute of Electrical and Electronics Engineers (IEEE) in 2013 for his contributions to transmission optimization in digital subscriber loops.
