= Hussein T. Mouftah =

Researcher

Hussein Mouftah is a Canadian computer scientist and electrical engineer, currently the Canada Research Chair and Distinguished University Professor at University of Ottawa, and also a published author.

== Biography ==
Hussein T. Mouftah is an internationally acclaimed scholar who has made significant contributions to the understanding and knowledge of telecommunication networks, particularly in regard to high-speed networks, optical networks, network switching architectures, wireless cellular as well as ad hoc and sensor networks, smart grid, connected and autonomous electric vehicles, among other technical areas related to the next-generation Internet – the so-called Internet-of-Things.

Born in Alexandria, Egypt, he received the BSc in Electrical Engineering and MSc in computer science from the University of Alexandria, Egypt, in 1969 and 1972, respectively, and the PhD in electrical engineering from Laval University, Canada, in 1975. He was elevated to grade of IEEE fellow in 1990 for contributions to communications modeling. He joined the School of Electrical Engineering and Computer Science (was School of Information Technology and Engineering) of the University of Ottawa in 2002 as a Tier 1 Canada Research Chair Professor, where he became a University Distinguished Professor in 2006. He has been with the Electrical and Computer Engineering Department at Queen's University (1979-2002), where he was prior to his departure a full professor and the department associate head.
