= Zhisheng Niu =

Zhisheng Niu (Chinese: 牛志升) is a professor in the electrical engineering department of Tsinghua University. He became a Fellow of the Institute of Electronics, Information and Communication Engineers in 2007. In addition, he was named Fellow of the IEEE Communications Society (IEEE ComSoc) in 2012 "for contributions to collaborative radio resource management in wireless networks". He is also a Fellow of the Institute of Electronics, Information and Communication Engineers (IEICE), appointed 2007.

He holds a BS degree in Communication from Beijing Jiaotong University, (1985), a M.S., in Information Engineering, from Toyohashi University of Technology, Toyohashi, Japan (1989) and a Ph.D from the same department (1992).

From 2009-13, he was editor of IEEE Wireless Communication Magazine; from 2012–14, he was Associate Editor-in-Chief of the IEEE/CIC Joint Publication China Communications.
