= Tamas Linder =

Hungarian computer engineer

Támas Linder

Academic background
- Education: Budapest University of Technology and Economics (MS); Hungarian Academy of Sciences (PhD)

Academic work
- Discipline: Computer engineering
- Sub-discipline: Data compression Information theory Machine learning Pattern recognition
- Institutions: Coordinated Science Laboratory; University of California, San Diego; Queen's University at Kingston

Tamás Linder is a Hungarian computer engineer working as a professor at the Queen's University at Kingston

== Education ==
Linder earned a Master of Science degree in electrical engineering from the Budapest University of Technology and Economics in 1988 and a PhD in electrical engineering from the Hungarian Academy of Sciences in 1992. He was a post-doctoral researcher at the University of Hawaiʻi at Mānoa and a Fulbright Scholar at the Coordinated Science Laboratory from 1993 to 1994.

== Career ==
From 1994 to 1998, Linder a member of the computer science faculty at the Budapest University of Technology and Economics. He was also a visiting research scholar in the Department of Electrical and Computer Engineering at the University of California, San Diego. Linder joined the Queen's University at Kingston in 1998. In 2003 and 2004, he was an associate editor of IEEE Transactions on Information Theory. Linder was named a fellow of the Institute of Electrical and Electronics Engineers (IEEE) in 2013 for his contributions to source coding and quantization.
