= Wei Yu =

Canadian electrical engineer

Wei Yu is a Canadian electrical engineer. He is a professor and Canada Research Chair in Information Theory and Wireless Communication at the University of Toronto. He was elected a Fellow of the Institute of Electrical and Electronics Engineers (IEEE) in 2014 "for contributions to optimization techniques for multiple-input-multiple-output communications". He received his bachelor's degree from the University of Waterloo in 1997, and his Ph.D. in electrical engineering from Stanford University in 2002. He is a Fellow of the Canadian Academy of Engineering.
