= Weidong Mao =

Electrical engineer

Weidong Mao is an electrical engineer at Comcast Cable in Philadelphia. He was named a Fellow of the Institute of Electrical and Electronics Engineers (IEEE) in 2014 for his contributions to video on demand technologies and cloud computing.
