= Ta Sung Lee =

Taiwanese professor of electrical engineering

Ta Sung Lee (李大嵩) is a Taiwanese professor of electrical engineering at National Chiao Tung University (NCTU). He studied electrical engineering at National Taiwan University as an undergraduate, graduating in 1983 before moving to the United States where he received an M.S. degree from in the same field from the University of Wisconsin–Madison in 1987 and a Ph.D. from Purdue University in 1989. The following year, he returned to Taiwan, where he joined the NCTU faculty. He was named Fellow of the Institute of Electrical and Electronics Engineers (IEEE) in 2016 "for leadership and contributions in communication systems and signal processing".
