= Yusheng Ji =

Japanese electrical engineer

Yusheng Ji (計 宇生) is an international electrical engineer specializing in wireless networks for vehicular communications and vehicle-based edge computing. She is a professor/director at the National Institute of Informatics, where she directs the Information Systems Architecture Science Research Division, and a professor in The Graduate University for Advanced Studies.

== Biography ==
Ji studied electrical engineering at the University of Tokyo, earning bachelor's, master's, and doctoral degrees there, and completing her studies in 1989. In 1990 she joined the National Center for Science Information Systems, which in 2000 became the National Institute of Informatics.

Ji was named as an IEEE Fellow in 2022 "for contribution to distributed computing in mobile and dynamic systems".
