= Gerhard Bauch =

German engineer

Gerhard Bauch from the Hamburg University of Technology was named Fellow of the Institute of Electrical and Electronics Engineers (IEEE) in 2015 "for contributions to iterative processing in multiple-input multiple-output systems".
