= Jia Wang =

Engineer

Jia Wang is an engineer at AT&T Labs Research in Bedminster, New Jersey. Wang was named a Fellow of the Institute of Electrical and Electronics Engineers (IEEE) in 2016 for contributions to measurement and management of large operational networks.
