= Sonia Aïssa =

Canadian electrical engineer and computer scientist

Sonia Aïssa is a professor in the Institut national de la recherche scientifique (INRS) of the Université du Québec, in the INRS Research Centre for Energy, Materials, and Telecommunications. Her current research interests include modeling, design and performance analysis of wireless communication systems and networks.

== Education and career ==
Aïssa earned a doctorate in electrical and computer engineering in 1998 from McGill University, following which she joined the INRS.

From 1996 to 1997, Aïssa was a Researcher with the Department of Electronics and Communications of Kyoto University of Japan, and with the Wireless Systems Laboratories of NTT, Kanagawa, Japan. From 1998 to 2000, Aïssa was a research associate at INRS-EMT in Montreal. Then from 2000 to 2002, while she was an assistant professor, she was a Principal Investigator in the major program of personal and mobile communications of the Canadian Institute for Telecommunications Research (CITR), leading research in radio resource management for wireless networks. From 2004 to 2007, she was an adjunct professor with Concordia University, Montreal. In 2006, she was Visiting Invited Professor with the Graduate School of Informatics, Kyoto University, Japan.

She currently serves as an Area Editor of the IEEE Transactions on Wireless Communications as of 2019.

== Recognition ==
Aïssa was elected as a Fellow of the Institute of Electrical and Electronics Engineers in 2019, "for contributions to design and performance analysis of cognitive radio and cooperative communication systems".

She also is a member of the Canadian Academy of Engineering.
