= Zhouyue Pi =

Electrical engineer

Zhouyue (Jerry) Pi is an engineer who was the Chief Technology Officer at Straight Path Communications, Inc from 2014 to 2018.

Pi pioneered the development of millimeter-wave 5G while working for Samsung Research America in Dallas, Texas.

He co-authored the world's first patent application and journal article on millimeter-wave mobile broadband. His group developed the world's first 28 GHz millimeter-wave 5G prototype system in 2011.

Pi was named a Fellow of the Institute of Electrical and Electronics Engineers (IEEE) in 2016 for his work on millimeter wave communication technology.
