= Honggang Wang =

Educator and scholar

Honggang Wang is a professor and founding department chair of Graduate Computer Science and Engineering at Yeshiva University. He was named Fellow of the Institute of Electrical and Electronics Engineers (IEEE) in 2021 for contribution to low power wireless for IoT and multimedia applications.

== Biography ==
He received a Ph.D. in computer engineering from University of Nebraska–Lincoln in 2009. Honggang Wang is an alumnus of the NAE Frontiers of Engineering program and has supervised the graduation of over 30 graduate students. He has written articles in the fields of AI and Internet of things, mobile networks, multimedia and cyber security, smart and connected health, and multimedia communications. He has won several best paper awards throughout his career.

Wang is an IEEE distinguished lecturer and a Fellow of IEEE and AAIA (Asia-Pacific Artificial Intelligence Association). He served as editor in chief (2020–2022) of IEEE Internet of Things Journal (IoT-J). He is past chair of the IEEE Multimedia Communications Technical Committee (2018–2020) and the IEEE eHealth Technical Committee Chair (2020–2021).. He is the Editor-in-Chief of IEEE Transactions on Multimedia (2026-2028).
