= Martin Haenggi =

American electrical engineer

Martin Haenggi is the Frank M. Freimann Professor of electrical engineering at the University of Notre Dame in South Bend, Indiana. He was named a Fellow of the Institute of Electrical and Electronics Engineers (IEEE) in 2014 for his contributions to the spatial modeling and analysis of wireless networks.

Haenggi graduated from ETH Zurich with M.Sc. and Ph.D. degrees in 1995 and 1999, respectively. He is a former editor-in-chief of the IEEE Transactions on Wireless Communications and a Clarivate Analytics Highly Cited Researcher. In 2012, Cambridge University Press published one of his books, Stochastic Geometry for Wireless Networks.
