= Wenjing Lou =

Electrical engineer

Wenjing Lou, a professor at the Virginia Polytechnic Institute and State University, Falls Church, Virginia campus since 2011, was named Fellow of the Institute of Electrical and Electronics Engineers (IEEE) in 2015 for contributions to information and network security. She was named as an ACM Fellow, in the 2023 class of fellows, with the same citation.

Before joining Virginia Tech, she was a faculty member in the Department of Electrical and Computer Engineering at Worcester Polytechnic Institute (WPI) from 2003 to 2011. She holds a Ph.D. in Electrical and Computer Engineering from the University of Florida, an M.A.Sc. in Computer Communications from Nanyang Technological University in Singapore, and both an M.S. and B.S. in Computer Science and Engineering from Xi'an Jiaotong University in China.
