= Xi Zhang (professor) =

Chinese Professor of Electrical and Computer Engineering

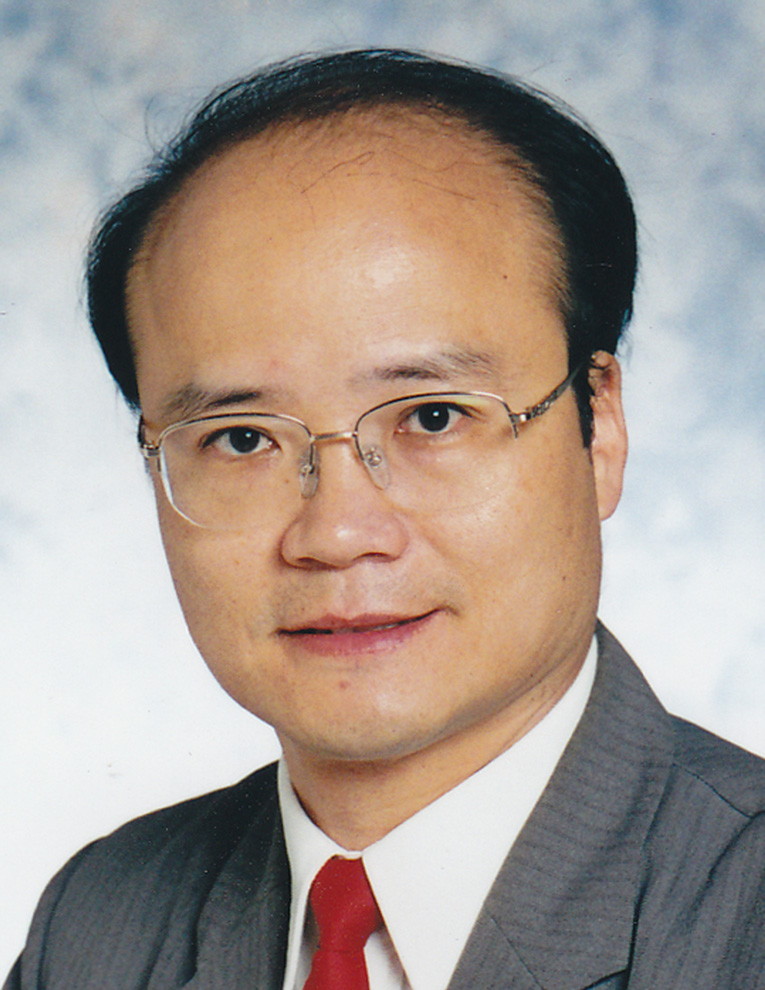
- Education: The University of Michigan
- Scientific career
- Fields: Quality of service, 6G (network), wireless network, Multimedia, Machine learning, finite blocklength coding, edge computing, Unmanned aerial vehicle, Terahertz radiation, information-centric networking, 5G wireless network, network virtualization
- Workplaces: Texas A&M University
- Doctoral advisor: Prof. Kang G. Shin

Xi Zhang (Chinese: 张曦) is a full professor and the Founding Director of the Networking and Information Systems Laboratory, Department of Electrical and Computer Engineering, Texas A&M University. He is a Fellow of the IEEE for contributions to quality of service (QoS) in mobile wireless networks. His research interests include statistical delay-bounded QoS provisioning for multimedia mobile wireless networks, edge computing, finite blocklength coding theory, in-network caching, and offloading over 5G mobile wireless networks.

== Education ==
- Ph.D., in Electrical Engineering and Computer Science (Electrical Engineering—Systems), The University of Michigan, in Ann Arbor, Michigan, U.S. (Advisor: Prof. Kang G. Shin)
- M.S., in Electrical Engineering and Computer Science, Lehigh University, in Bethlehem, Pennsylvania, U.S.
- M.S., in Electrical Engineering and Computer Science, Xidian University, in Xi'an, China
- B.S., in Electrical Engineering and Computer Science, Xidian University, Xi'an, China

== Research Works ==
He has published more than 400 research papers on wireless networks and communications systems, network protocol design and modeling, statistical communications, random signal processing, information theory, and control theory and systems. He received Best Paper Awards at international conferences of IEEE GLOBECOM 2020, IEEE ICC 2018, IEEE GLOBECOM 2014, IEEE GLOBECOM 2009, IEEE GLOBECOM 2007, and IEEE WCNC 2010, respectively. One of his IEEE Journal on Selected Areas in Communications papers has been listed as the IEEE Best Readings (receiving the top citation rate) Paper on Wireless Cognitive Radio Networks and Statistical QoS Provisioning over Mobile Wireless Networking.

== Major Awards and Honors ==
- IEEE Fellow for Contributions to the Quality of Service (QoS) Theory in Mobile Wireless Networks
- U.S. National Science Foundation (NSF) EARLY CAREER Award in 2004
- IEEE BEST READINGS (receiving top citation rate) PAPER for one of his IEEE Journal on Selected Areas in Communications papers in Cognitive Radio Networks and Statistical QoS Provisioning Over Wireless Networks since 2008
- Best Paper Award in IEEE Global Communications Conference (GLOBECOM) 2020, Taipei, Taiwan, 2020
- Best Paper Award in IEEE International Conference on Communications (ICC) 2018, Kansas City, MO, USA, 2018
- Best Paper Award in IEEE Global Communications Conference (GLOBECOM) 2014, Austin, Texas, USA, 2014
- Best Paper Award in IEEE Global Communications Conference (GLOBECOM) 2009, Hawaii, USA, 2009
- Best Paper Award in IEEE Wireless Communications and Networks Conference (WCNC) 2010, Sydney, Australia, 2010
- Best Paper Award in IEEE Global Communications Conference (GLOBECOM) 2007, Washington, D.C., USA, 2007
- IEEE Journal on Selected Areas in Communications BEST PAPER AWARD Candidate on Statistical QoS Provisioning for Multimedia Transmission Over Multicast Wireless Networks, 2010
- IEEE Distinguished Lecturer in IEEE Communications Society
- IEEE Distinguished Lecturer in IEEE Vehicular Technology Society
- IEEE Journal on Selected Areas in Communications BEST PAPER AWARD Candidate on Statistical QoS Provisioning for Relay Wireless Networks, 2007
- Outstanding Faculty Award from Department of Electrical and Computer Engineering at Texas A&M University, 2020
- TEES Select Young Faculty Award for Excellence in Research from College of Engineering at Texas A&M University, 2006
