= Liuqing Yang =

Liuqing Yang is a Chinese electrical engineer who works at the Hong Kong University of Science and Technology (Guangzhou) as a chair professor. She has also been a professor at the University of Minnesota, Colorado State University, and University of Florida.

Yang was named Fellow of the Institute of Electrical and Electronics Engineers (IEEE) in 2015 for contributions to theory and practice of ultra-wideband communications.
