= Songwu Lu =

Electrical engineer

Songwu Lu from the University of California, Los Angeles was named Fellow of the Institute of Electrical and Electronics Engineers (IEEE) in 2016 for contributions to wireless and mobile networking and network security. He was elected as an ACM Fellow in 2019 "for helping create a more resilient and performant cellular network".

Lu received a Bachelor of Science from the University of Science and Technology of China, and a Master of Science and Phd in 1999 in electrical engineering from the University of Illinois Urbana-Champaign.
