= Marco Luise =

Italian academic

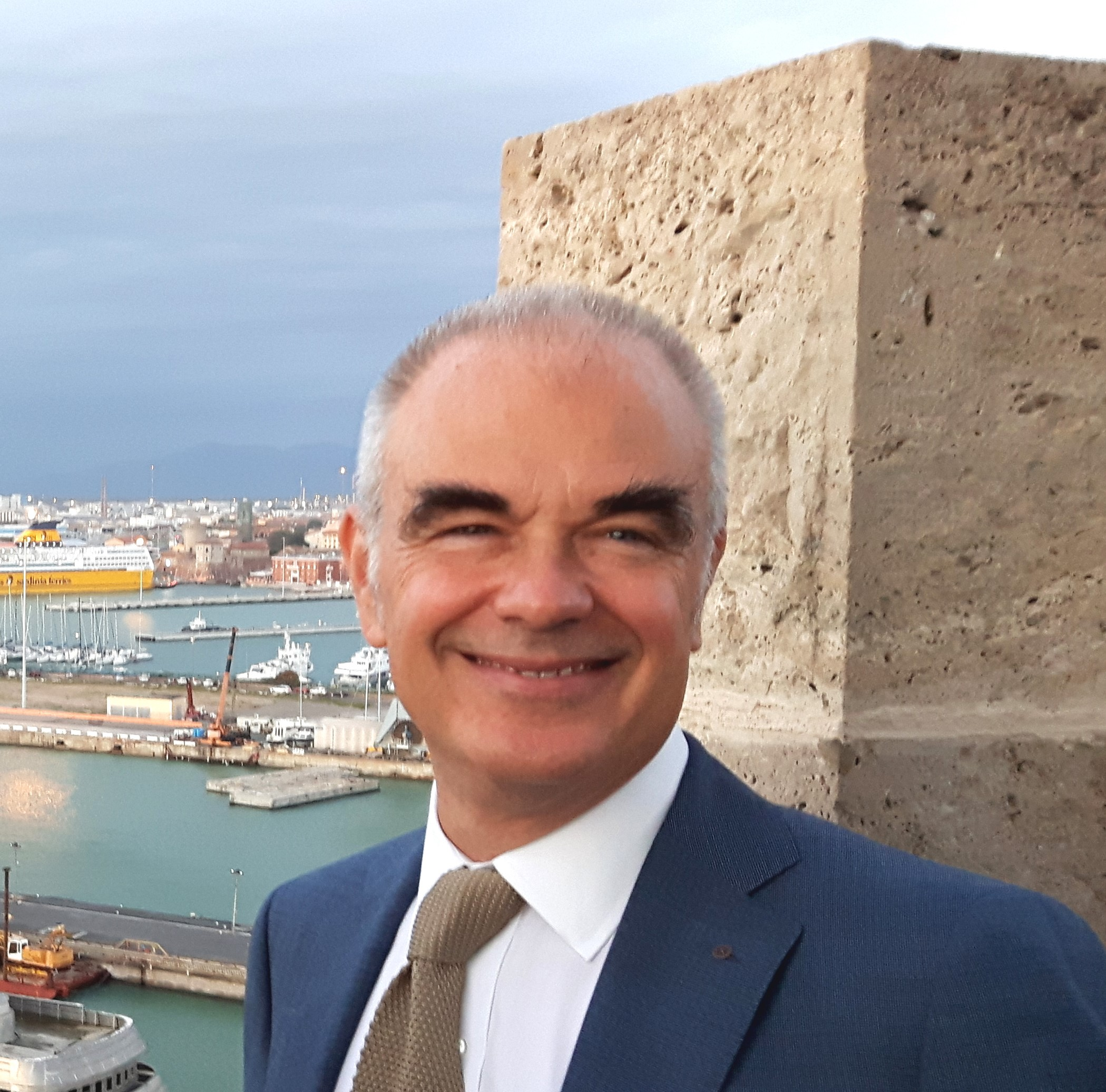
M. Luise in 2017

Marco Luise is a professor of Digital Communications at the University of Pisa, Italy, where he leads the PhD program in ICT Engineering. Born in Livorno, Italy, in 1960, he was a Research Fellow of the European Space Agency at the research centre ESTEC in the Netherlands, and of the Consorzio Nazionale delle Ricerche (CNR), Italy. He was named Fellow of the Institute of Electrical and Electronics Engineers (IEEE) in 2012 for contributions to synchronization and signal processing in communications. He is presently the Chairman of the Conservatorio (Music University) "Pietro Mascagni" in Livorno, Italy. His main research interests lie in the broad area of communication theory, with particular emphasis on wireless communications, mobile and satellite communications, and satellite positioning systems. He's been the Coordinator of the EC FP7 Network of Excellence on Wireless Communications NEWCOM# and has authored more than 300 technical papers, books, and patents in his research field.
