= Dimitrios Hatzinakos =

Electrical engineer

Dimitrios Hatzinakos is an electrical engineer at the University of Toronto, Ontario. He was named a Fellow of the Institute of Electrical and Electronics Engineers (IEEE) in 2016 for his contributions to signal processing techniques for communications, multimedia, and biometrics.
