= Biao Chen =

Chinese-American electrical engineer

- Biao Chen
- Education: Tsinghua University, University of Connecticut
- Occupation: Professor of Electrical Engineering
- Awards: NSF Career Award
- Scientific career
- Fields: Information Theory
- Workplaces: Syracuse University
- Doctoral advisor: Peter Willett
- Website: ecs.syracuse.edu/faculty-staff/biao-chen

Biao Chen is a professor of electrical engineering and computer science at Syracuse University. He was named Fellow of the Institute of Electrical and Electronics Engineers (IEEE) in 2015 for "contributions to decentralized signal processing in sensor networks and interference management of wireless networks".

== Early life and education ==
Chen received B.E. and M.E. degrees in electrical engineering from Tsinghua University in 1992 and 1994, respectively. He got an M.S. in statistics and his Ph.D. in electrical engineering from the University of Connecticut.

== Career ==
After leaving Tsinghua University, Chen worked at AT&T in Beijing. He later did a postdoctoral fellowship at Cornell University. Chen has taught at Syracuse University since 2000, and has been the John E. and Patricia A. Breyer professor of electrical engineering since 2017. He has been area editor for the IEEE Transactions on Signal Processing and associate editor for the IEEE Communications Letters, the IEEE Transactions on Signal Processing, and the EURASIP Journal on Wireless Communications and Networking.

== Personal life ==
Biao Chen is a long distance runner. He placed first for his age group in the 2025 and 2026 Syracuse Half Marathon. He ran the 2024 Boston Marathon, 2025 Boston Marathon and 2026 Boston Marathon:

- "Biao Chen 2024 Boston Marathon Results". Boston, MA: Boston Athletic Association. 2024-04-15.
- "Biao Chen 2025 Boston Marathon Results". Boston, MA: Boston Athletic Association. 2025-04-21.
- "Biao Chen 2026 Boston Marathon Results". results.baa.org. Boston, MA: Boston Athletic Association. 2026-04-27. Archived from the original on 27 Apr 2026.
