= Zan Li =

Chinese communications engineer

Zan Li (Chinese: 李赞, born 1975) is a Chinese communications engineer whose research focuses on covert wireless communication, cognitive radio, and localization, particularly for unmanned aerial vehicles. She is a professor in the School of Telecommunication Engineering at Xidian University, affiliated with the State Key Laboratory of Integrated Service Networks, and vice president of the university.

== Education and career ==
Li was born in 1975 in Xi'an. She was a student of communication and information systems at Xidian University, where she received a bachelor's degree in 1998, master's degree in 2001, and 2006. She joined Xidian University as a faculty member after her master's degree, in 2001.

== Recognition ==
Li was elected as an IEEE Fellow in 2025, "for contributions in theoretical foundations and system development of spectrum monitoring and cognition-based secure communications". She is also a fellow of the Institution of Engineering and Technology, the China Institute of Electronics, and the China Institute of Communications.
