= Jianping Wang =

Chinese computer scientist

Jianping Wang (Chinese: 汪建平) is a Chinese computer scientist, a chair professor of computer science and dean of the College of Computing at the City University of Hong Kong. Her research interests include self-organization in wireless ad hoc networks, edge computing, and vehicular automation.

== Education and career ==
Wang was a student of computer science at Nankai University, where she earned a bachelor's degree in 1996 and a master's degree in 1999. She completed a PhD in the US, at the University of Texas at Dallas in 2003. Her dissertation, QoS-assuring Multicast in WDM Networks, was supervised by Biao Chen.

She became an assistant professor at Georgia Southern University, and then the University of Mississippi, before taking her present position at the City University of Hong Kong. Before becoming dean of computing, she served the university as Assistant Provost for Strategic Planning and Quality Assurance.

== Recognition ==
Wang was named an IEEE Fellow in 2023, "for contributions to resiliency of complex systems". In the same year she was also named a fellow of the Asia-Pacific Artificial Intelligence Association.
