= Michèle Wigger =

Information theorist

Michèle Angela Wigger is an information theorist whose research concerns channel capacity in telecommunications. Educated in Switzerland, she works in France as a professor in the Information Processing and Communication Laboratory of Télécom Paris.

== Education and career ==
Wigger received a master's degree in electrical engineering from ETH Zurich in 2003. She continued there for a 2008 Ph.D., with the dissertation Cooperation on the Multiple-Access Channel supervised by Amos Lapidoth.

She was a postdoctoral researcher at ETH Zurich from 2008 to 2009, and at the University of California, San Diego in 2009. In the same year she joined Télécom Paris as maître de conférences. She received a habilitation through Paris-East Créteil University in 2015, and subsequently became a professor at Télécom Paris until early 2026. She is now a full professor at CentraleSupelec.

== Recognition ==
Wigger was the 2025 recipient of the Michel Montpetit Prize of Inria and the French Academy of Sciences.

She was named as a distinguished lecturer of the IEEE Information Theory Society in 2022, and was named to the 2026 class of IEEE Fellows, "for contributions to feedback communication and caching".
