= Sujata Banerjee =

Indian and American computer scientist

- Born: India
- Education: Indian Institute of Technology Bombay (B.Tech.), University of Southern California (Ph.D.)
- Awards: Fellow of the IEEE
- Scientific career
- Fields: Computer networking, Distributed systems, Cloud computing
- Workplaces: Microsoft; VMware Research; Hewlett-Packard

Sujata Banerjee is a computer scientist specializing in the performance and quality of service of computer networks and data centers. Born in the UK, and educated in India and the US, she works in the US as vice president for research at VMware.

== Education and career ==
Banerjee was born in the UK but grew up in Mumbai, India; she has bachelor's and master's degrees from IIT Bombay. She entered the USC Viterbi School of Engineering at the University of Southern California, intending to study in its Communications Sciences Institute, but soon switched to computer networks and completed a Ph.D. in electrical engineering in 1993. Her dissertation, Distributed database systems in high-speed networks, was supervised by Victor O. Li.

After earning tenure as a faculty member at the University of Pittsburgh, she moved to industry, first at HP Labs, and then in 2017 moving again to VMware as a senior staff researcher and director for external research.

== Recognition ==
Banerjee was elected as an IEEE Fellow in 2022, "for leadership in programmable and energy efficient networks".
