= Hairong Qi =

Chinese computer scientist

Hairong Qi (born 1970) is a Chinese computer scientist known for her work in image processing, computer vision, signal processing, sensor networks, and visual sensor networks. She is Gonzalez Family Professor of Electrical Engineering and Computer Science at the University of Tennessee.

== Education and career ==
Qi studied computer science at Northern Jiaotong University, earning a bachelor's degree in 1992 and a master's degree in 1995. She came to the US for doctoral study at North Carolina State University, and completed her Ph.D. there in 1999. Her dissertation, A High-Resolution, Large-Area, Digital Imaging System, was supervised by Wesley Snyder.

She joined the University of Tennessee faculty in 1999, and was named Gonzalez Family Professor in 2014.

In 2022, Qi was a part of a team using a $1 million grant to produce and implement a computer vision system to monitor poultry production. The project aims to create a computer vision system to monitor animal-based measures in real time. The grant was funded by the Agriculture and Food Research Initiative. Although similar projects have been undertaken for larger animals, researchers state that poultry are more difficult due to their smaller size and higher populations. The team for this project includes Yang Zhao, Robert Burns, Hao Gan, Shawn Hawkins, Daniel Berckmans, Maria Prado and Hairong Qi.

== Books ==
Qi is the coauthor, with Wesley Snyder, of two books in computer vision: Machine Vision (Cambridge University Press, 2004), and Fundamentals of Computer Vision (Cambridge University Press, 2017).

== Recognition ==
Qi was elected as an IEEE Fellow in 2018 "for contributions to collaborative signal processing in sensor networks".
