= Shaoqian Li =

Chinese industrial engineer

Shaoqian Li is an industrial engineer and Fellow of the Institute of Electrical and Electronics Engineers (IEEE), having been so appointed in 2016 "for leadership in development of broadband wireless networks". He teaches at the University of Electronic Science and Technology of China in Sichuan, PRC.
