= Mikael Skoglund =

Swedish academic

- Born: Kungälv, Sweden
- Occupation: Academic

Academic background
- Education: Ph.D. in Electrical Engineering
- Alma mater: Chalmers University of Technology

Academic work
- Institutions: KTH Royal Institute of Technology

Mikael Skoglund is an academic born 1969 in Kungälv, Sweden. He is a professor of Communication theory, and the Head of the Division of Information Science and Engineering of the Department of Intelligent Systems at KTH Royal Institute of Technology. His research focuses on source-channel coding, signal processing, information theory, privacy, security, and with a particular focus on how information theory applies to wireless communications.

Skoglund has been issued six patents.

Skoglund is a Fellow of IEEE. From 2003 to 2008, he was the Associate Editor of the IEEE Transactions on Communications, and from 2009 through 2012 for the IEEE Transactions on Information Theory. He was also an associate editor for MDPI Information, and PeerJ Computer Science.

In 2019, Skoglund served as general co-chair for IEEE ITW, and in 2022 he was a co-chair of the Technical Program Committee for IEEE ISIT. Starting 2023, he is an elected member of the IEEE Information Theory Society Board of Governors.

== Education ==
Skoglund served as a teaching and research assistant between 1992, and 1997 and graduated with a Ph.D. degree in Electrical Engineering from the Chalmers University of Technology based in Sweden. Subsequently, he completed his post doctorate at KTH Royal Institute of Technology in 1998.

== Career ==
Following his post-doctorate, Skoglund started his academic career in the Department of Signals Sensors and Systems at KTH, and was appointed as an assistant professor in 1998. Later on, he was promoted to associate professor in 2001. He was appointed as Docent in Signal Processing at KTH, and has been serving as a professor of Communication Theory since 2003.

From 2004 to 2016, Skoglund served as the head of KTH Department of Communication Theory, and also held the concurrent appointment of Program Director for the KTH Linnaeus ACCESS Graduate School between 2006 and 2017. Later on, he became the Vice-Dean of KTH School of Electrical Engineering, and held that appointment from 2009 to 2017. He also held a brief appointment as the Chair of KTH EE Employment Committee. Since 2003, he is the Chaired Professor of Communication Theory at KTH. He is furthermore the Director of KTH Strategic Research Area TNG, and Head of KTH Department of Intelligent Systems since 2020.

== Research ==
Skoglund's research works span the fields of information theory, coding for wireless communications, applications in cyber security and signal processing.

=== Applications in wireless communications ===
Skoglund assessed how when the partial channel knowledge is sent to the transmitter, significant gains are received leading to attaining high-rate data communication, and improved performance in multiple-antenna wireless systems. His most cited work, “Combining beamforming and orthogonal space-time block coding” was the first to address the association between space-time coding and linear adaptive transmission. According to his research, in contrast to conventional methods when the proposed system combining the benefits of beamforming, and orthogonal space-time block coding was employed, significant gains were evident. Prior to this, in a 2001 research study with George Jöngren, the significance of robustness of feedback information for improving the space-time block code with the linear transformation was determined for which they had a patent issued as well.

In another of his research studies conducted in 2000, he looked into improving the performance of space-time code by the utilization of quantized feedback information, that consequently had led to the proposition of relying on non-perfect channel information. Having discussed that, he has also focused his research on the quantized feedback with respect to rate and power control of algorithms, and determined how the changes in the channel can be addressed to the transmitter by the receiver, given the specific expected rate in the feedback link.

Skoglund proposed the first multiple-user cooperative communications approach based on linear network coding in a 2011 research study. It presented the evidence for the deterministic diversity network codes (DNCs) and reported the diversity order to be significantly better than the other benchmark schemes. In addition to that, a simpler version of the proposed DNC was presented as well, which still have the potential to carry out similar performance such as the achieving the diversity order being 2 M – 1. According to his research on design of network codes regarding the multiple-user multiple-relay (MUMR), it was reported that it is crucial to incorporate the MDS coding into the FFNC in order to attain finite field network coding (FFNC). While comparing the FFNC performance to the SC, a significantly better performance was evident for FFNC with respect to SC for the relays. Moreover, the research concluded that the proposed codes can obtain the diversity order in the nonorthogonal channels as well. He has also expanded his research on the nested polar codes for wiretap and relay channels which showed that they can obtain the capacity-equivocation for the wiretap channel. With respect to cooperative relaying in wireless networks, it was also illustrated the polar codes suitable for the following relays; decode-and-forward (DF) and compress-and-forward can attain gains in the energy and throughput efficiency.

=== Source-channel coding ===
Skoglund has also researched source-channel coding with a particular focus on how the source-channel coding techniques can efficiently convey the channel information, and how the information can be utilized in the improvement of performance. In one of his research works, an innovative robust vector quantizer design was introduced for the joint source-channel coding. His research work on source-channel decoding illustrated the framework aimed at reproducing quantized data over wireless channels with the use of soft information. He also presented the hybrid digital and analog transmission framework aimed at allowing compression and expansion, and thus provided a robust performance for a channel variation system. The joint design of the sensor measurement quantization over a noisy channel was also proposed by him. Having considered the control stabilization as the fundamental design criterion, he elaborated on the design elements of the proposed approach.

=== Information theory and communications ===
Skoglund's research on information theory had made significant contributions to fields of wireless communication with an emphasis on exploring the issues regarding relaying and broadcasting. While considering the non-perfect channel information, he presented a fundamental theoretical model for the with respect to multi-antenna transmission link. Later on in 2004, his research work was the first in the literature to examine the feedback link errors, and present an optimal scheme which succeeds in being robust against not only the estimation errors but the feedback channel noise as well. His research on the wireless systems has also provided insights into the understanding diversity tradeoffs, and was the first to employ the diversity-multiplexing (D-M) tradeoff approach in order to characterize the wireless multiple-antenna schemes performance by the use of quantized channel feedback. Another of his pioneering works concentrated upon providing the theoretical feasibility study focused on the cognitive radio in a frequency-planned environment. He also researched the linear-relaying, and the piecewise linear (PL) relaying, and reported that PL relaying has a better performance than the conventional linear-relaying. Moreover, the research concluded that based on the source-channel decoding principles, the PL relaying has the potential to outperform complex relay protocols. In another of his awarded research works, he explored the network coding strategies for wireless relay networks with backhaul, and significant gains were reported when compared to other benchmark schemes.

== Awards and honors ==
- 2019 – Elevated to IEEE Fellow
- 2020 – Editor's choice award, MDPI Entropy

=== Selected articles ===
- Jongren, G., Skoglund, M., & Ottersten, B. (2002). Combining beamforming and orthogonal space-time block coding. IEEE Transactions on Information theory, 48(3), 611–627.
- Xiao, M., & Skoglund, M. (2010). Multiple-user cooperative communications based on linear network coding. IEEE Transactions on Communications, 58(12), 3345–3351.
- Andersson, M., Rathi, V., Thobaben, R., Kliewer, J., & Skoglund, M. (2010). Nested polar codes for wiretap and relay channels. IEEE Communications Letters, 14(8), 752–754.
- Xiao, M., Kliewer, J., & Skoglund, M. (2012). Design of network codes for multiple-user multiple-relay wireless networks. IEEE Transactions on Communications, 60(12), 3755–3766.
- Kim, T. T., & Skoglund, M. (2007). On the expected rate of slowly fading channels with quantized side information. IEEE Transactions on Communications, 55(4), 820–829.
