= Sabrina De Capitani di Vimercati =

Italian computer scientist

Sabrina De Capitani di Vimercati (born 1971) is an Italian computer scientist specializing in data security and access control. She is a professor of computer science at the University of Milan.

== Education and career ==
De Capitani di Vimercati received a laurea from the University of Milan in 1996, and continued there for a Ph.D. in 2001.

She became an assistant professor at the University of Brescia in 1999 before returning to the Information Technology Department of the University of Milan as an associate professor in 2003. The department was later renamed as the Computer Science Department, and she became a full professor in it in 2007.

== Recognition ==
De Capitani di Vimercati was named to the 2026 class of IEEE Fellows, "for contributions to access control, security, and trust management".
