= Liang Xiao =

Chinese communications engineer

- 肖亮
- Citizenship: Chinese
- Education: Nanjing University of Posts and Telecommunications (bachelor's degree) 2000, Tsinghua University (master's degree) 2003, Rutgers University (Ph.D.) 2009
- Occupations: Communications Engineer, Professor
- Employer(s): Xiamen University, (Department of Communication Engineering)
- Known for: Contributions to learning based wireless security

Liang Xiao (Chinese: 肖亮) is a Chinese communications engineer, and a professor in the Department of Communication Engineering at Xiamen University. Her research interests include wireless communication, network security, smart grids, and machine learning.

== Education and career ==
Xiao received a bachelor's degree in communication engineering from Nanjing University of Posts and Telecommunications in 2000, and a master's degree in electrical engineering from Tsinghua University in 2003. After two years at North Carolina State University, she transferred to Rutgers University in the US, where she received a Ph.D. in 2009. At Rutgers, she was jointly supervised by Narayan Mandayam, Larry Greenstein, and Wade Trappe.

She joined Xiamen University in 2009.

== Recognition ==
Xiao was a distinguished lecturer of the IEEE Communications Society in 2023. She was named to the 2025 class of IEEE Fellows "for contributions to learning based wireless security".
