= Yasamin Mostofi =

Iranian-American scientist

- Known for: RF Sensing, Communication-Aware Robotics, Wireless Communications, Control/Robotics
- Awards: Presidential Early Career Award for Scientists and Engineers from President Obama, IEEE Control Systems Society Antonio Ruberti Young Researcher Prize, IEEE Fellow, National Science Foundation CAREER Award
- Scientific career
- Fields: Electrical engineering
- Workplaces: University of California, Santa Barbara
- Website: web.ece.ucsb.edu/~ymostofi/

Yasamin Mostofi is an Iranian-American Scientist and a professor of electrical and computer engineering at the University of California Santa Barbara. Mostofi's research is multi-disciplinary, expanding wireless communications, sensing, and control/robotics.

== Education and career ==
Mostofi got her B.S. degree in electrical engineering from Sharif University of Technology and her M.S. and Ph.D. degrees in Electrical Engineering from Stanford University in 1999 and 2004 respectively. She is a major contributor to two research areas:

- RF Sensing, such as sensing and learning about the environment with WiFi signals. In 2009, Mostofi Showed it possible to image details of objects with WiFi signals. Since then her work has contributed to this area by showing how WiFi signals can be used for different through-wall sensing applications, such as occupancy analytics, person identification, activity recognition, localization/tracking and 3D Xray vision for drones.
- Communication-Aware, Path Planning, and Control

Mostofi's early work in these two areas won her the Presidential Early Career Award for Scientists and Engineer (PECASE) from President Obama in 2011.

== Selected honors/awards ==
- Presidential Early Career Award for Scientists and Engineer (PECASE) from President Obama, 2011.
- IEEE Control Systems Society Antonio Ruberti Young Researcher Prize, 2016 "For contributions to the fundamentals of communications and control co-optimization in mobile sensor networks". Mostofi is the first woman to receive this award.
- IEEE Fellow, 2020 for contributions to control and communications co-optimization in mobile sensor networks
- National Science Foundation (NSF) Career Award, 2009

Mostofi's accomplishments are highlighted in the book “Daughters of Persia, Pioneering Women of the World” by Mansoureh Pirnia, which is a historic account of high-impact Iranian women throughout history.

== Selected news appearances ==
Sample press coverage of her research lab includes BBC Digital Planet 2019, TechCrunch 2018, BBC 2017, Engadget 2017, Huffington Post UK 2015, BBC 2014, Engadget 2014, among others.
