= Meixia Tao =

Chinese electrical engineer

Meixia (Melissa) Tao (Chinese: 陶梅霞) is a Chinese electrical engineer whose research concerns resource allocation in wireless networks, beamforming, and edge computing. She is a distinguished professor of electronic engineering at Shanghai Jiao Tong University.

== Education and career ==
Tao studied electronic engineering at Fudan University, graduating in 1999. She completed her Ph.D. in 2003 at the Hong Kong University of Science and Technology.

After postdoctoral research at the Hong Kong Applied Science and Technology Research Institute, and an assistant professorship from 2004 to 2007 at the National University of Singapore, she moved to her present position at Shanghai Jiao Tong University.

== Recognition ==
Tao was elected as an IEEE Fellow, in the 2019 class of fellows, "for contributions to resource allocation in broadband wireless networks".
