= Jiangzhou Wang =

Electrical engineer

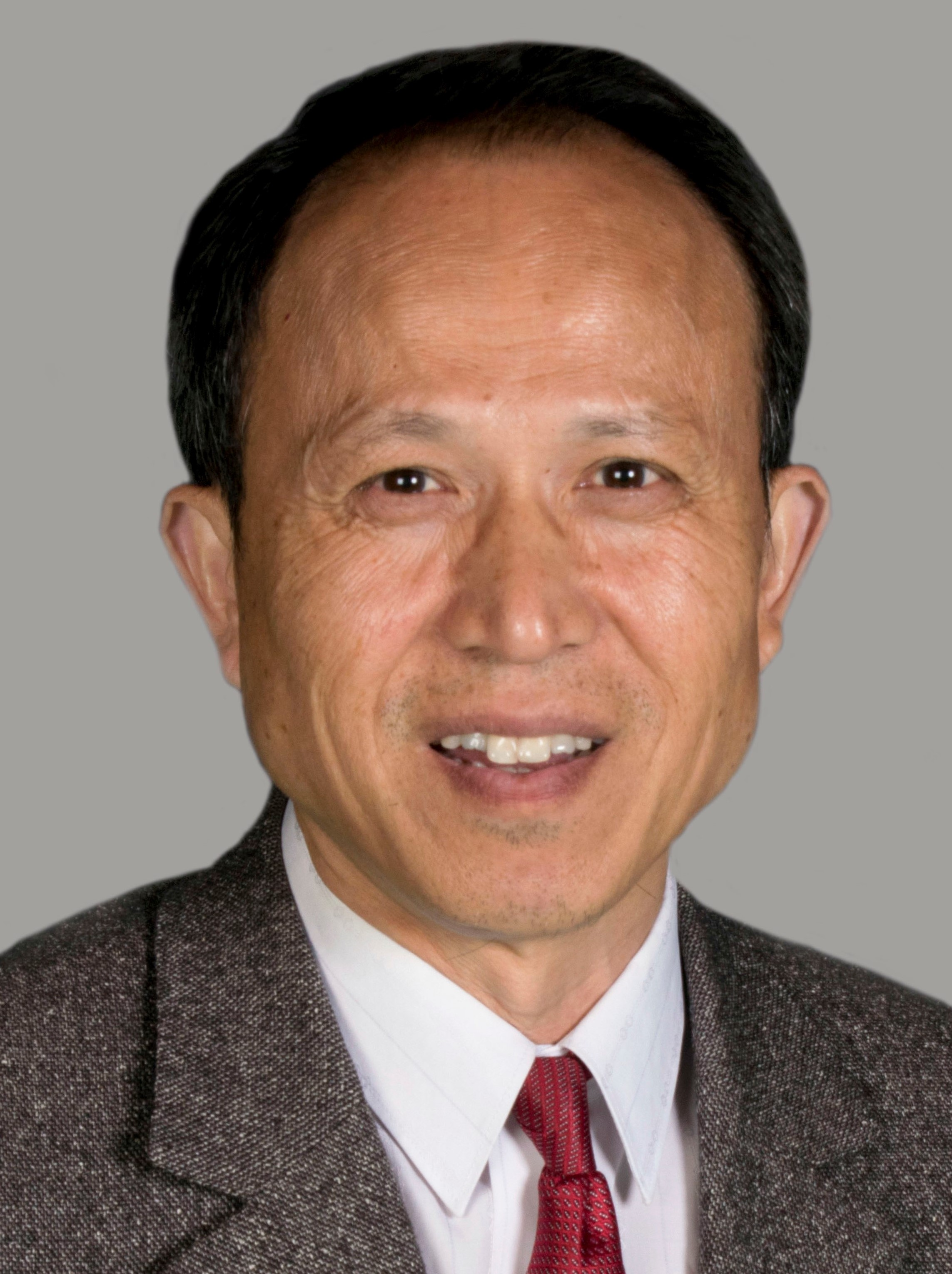
- Professor Jiangzhou Wang
- Born: Jiangzhou Wang is a Fellow of the Royal Academy of Engineering in 2018 for contributions to multiple-access and radio resource allocations for wireless mobile Communications. 15 November 1961 (age 64)
- Education: Xidian University(BEng, MEng), China; University of Ghent (PhD), Belgium
- Known for: Contributions to multiple-access and radio resource allocations for wireless mobile Communications
- Awards: Fellow of the Royal Academy of Engineering (2018) Fellow of the Institute of Electrical and Electronics Engineers (2017) Fellow of the Institute of Engineering and Technology (2011)

Jiangzhou Wang FREng (Chinese: 王江州) is the former Dean of Engineering and a professor at University of Kent, UK. He is a specialist in wireless mobile communications.

== Education ==
Wang obtained his bachelor and master degrees in communications engineering in 1983 and 1986, respectively, from Xidian University, China, and his PhD degree in applied sciences in 1990 from the University of Ghent, Belgium. Also, he studied for PhD degree from 1986 to 1988 from Southeast University, China.

== Career ==
In 1990, Wang joined the University of California, San Diego, USA, as a Postdoctoral Fellow doing research on mobile CDMA systems. In 1992, he joined Rockwell International Corporation, Newport Beach, California as a Senior Engineer, working on GSM systems. From 1995 to 2005, he was working at the University of Hong Kong. In 2005, he joined the University of Kent as a Professor.

He was an IEEE Distinguished Lecturer from 2013 to 2014. He was the Technical Program Chair of the 2019 IEEE International Conference on Communications (ICC2019), Shanghai, the Executive Chair of the IEEE ICC2015, London, and the Technical Program Chair of the IEEE WCNC2013. He has served as an Editor for a number of international journals, including IEEE Transactions on Communications from 1998 to 2013.

== Research ==
His research interests are in the areas of wireless communications. He has co-authored 4 books in wireless mobile communications and published over 300 papers in international journals and conferences. His research work has attractived over 10,000 citations

== Awards ==
He was elected a Fellow of the Royal Academy of Engineering in 2018 (2011) He is a Fellow of IEEE (elected 2017). He is a recipient of the Best Paper Award from the IEEE GLOBECOM2012, Anaheim, California.
