= Journal of Lightwave Technology =

- Discipline: Optical engineering
- Language: English
- Edited by: Magnus Karlsson

Publication details
- History: 1983–present
- Publisher: Optical Society and the IEEE Photonics Society
- Frequency: Biweekly
- Impact factor: 4.8 (2024)

Standard abbreviations
- ISO 4: J. Light. Technol.

Indexing
- CODEN: JLTEDG
- ISSN: 0733-8724 (print); 1558-2213 (web)
- LCCN: 83645426
- OCLC no.: 859585039

Links
- Journal homepage; Online access; Online archive

The Journal of Lightwave Technology is a biweekly peer-reviewed scientific journal covering optical guided-wave science, technology, and engineering. It is published jointly by the Optical Society and the IEEE Photonics Society. It was established in 1983 and the editor-in-chief is Magnus Karlsson (Chalmers University of Technology). According to the Journal Citation Reports, the journal has a 2024 impact factor of 4.8.
