= George N. Rouskas =

Computer scientist

- Occupations: Computer scientist, academic, and author
- Awards: National Science Foundation CAREER Award (1997); Outstanding Service Award, Optical Networking Technical Committee (ONTC), Institute of Electrical and Electronics Engineers (2009)

Academic background
- Education: BS., Computer Engineering; MS., Computer Science; PhD., Computer Science
- Alma mater: National Technical University of Athens; Georgia Institute of Technology

Academic work
- Institutions: North Carolina State University

George N. Rouskas is a computer scientist, academic, and author. He is an Alumni Distinguished Graduate Professor and Director of Graduate Programs in the Department of Computer Science at North Carolina State University.

Rouskas' research interests lie within the field of computer networking. Specifically, he focuses on optical networks, internet architectures and protocols, network design and optimization, performance modeling, and scheduling. He is the author of the book Internet Tiered Services, and co-editor of the books Traffic Grooming for Optical Networks and Next-Generation Internet: Architectures and Protocols. He is the recipient of the National Science Foundation CAREER Award, the 2004 ALCOA Foundation Engineering Research Achievement Award, as well as the Optical Networking Technical Committee (OTNC) Outstanding Service Award.

Rouskas is a Fellow of the Institute of Electrical and Electronics Engineers (IEEE), and served as an IEEE Distinguished Lecturer in 2010 for a year. From 2016 to 2017, he held key positions within the IEEE Communications Society, serving as the Chair of the Distinguished Lecturer Selection Committee, the Chair of the Optical Networking Technical Committee (ONTC), and the vice-chair of the Technical and Educational Activities Council. He served as the Founding Editor-in-Chief of Optical Switching and Networking from 2004 to 2017, and the Founding Editor-in-Chief of IEEE Networking Letters from 2018 to 2021.

== Education ==
Rouskas earned a bachelor's degree in Computer Engineering from the National Technical University of Athens in 1989. He then pursued a master's degree in Computer Science at the Georgia Institute of Technology, which he completed in 1991, and received a Ph.D. in Computer Science from the same institution in 1994.

== Career ==
Rouskas began his academic career at North Carolina State University in 1994 as an assistant professor. In 1999, he was appointed as an Associate Professor and later promoted to Professor in 2002, a position he held until 2018. Between 2000 and 2001, he spent a sabbatical term at Vitesse Semiconductor in Morrisville, North Carolina. He has held visiting positions at several institutions as well, including King Abdulaziz University, Laboratoire d’Informatique at the University of Paris 6, Universidad Tecnica Federico Santa Maria, and Laboratoire de Méthodes Informatiques at the University of Évry. Since 2018, he has been holding an appointment as the Alumni Distinguished Graduate Professor in the Department of Computer Science at North Carolina State University.

Since 2014, he has been serving as the Director of Graduate Programs in the Department of Computer Science at North Carolina State University.

== Research ==
Rouskas is most known for his work on designing architectures, protocols, and algorithms for internet-scale networks, utilizing interdisciplinary techniques from mathematical programming, discrete optimization, algorithmics, and queueing theory to create efficient and scalable solutions. He has published numerous peer-reviewed journal papers, conference papers and book chapters. Most notably, he has worked on the Jumpstart project, focusing on optical burst switching technology, and the DARPA-funded Helios project, involving multi-wavelength optical access networks.

=== Internet architecture and protocols ===
In 1997, Rouskas designed a network core addressing key internet challenges, offering solutions for service choice enablement, competition incentives, and control management, and formulated HiPeR-l, a novel reservation protocol for addressing media access problems in single-hop WDM networks. Afterwards, as part of the DARPA project, he, along with Ilya Baldin and Laura Jackson, presented an all-optical broadcast architecture for a LAN utilizing Wavelength Division Multiplexing (WDM). The Helios architecture, accompanied by a signaling protocol and control algorithms, integrated essential elements of DiffServ (Quality of Service) and multicast. In addition, he developed an "economy plane" facilitating the sale of services like QoS and storage by network providers as well as created a ChoiceNet prototype enabling contractual agreements between multiple service providers in GENI.

Rouskas expanded on the future of the Internet debate by proposing a holistic internetworking architecture that offered flexibility, security, and performance enhancements. His 2002 collaborative work proposed MTCP, a congestion control scheme for reliable multicast, and in 2020, he built an algorithm for online service chain routing in NFV, minimizing congestion and hops, demonstrating asymptotic optimality without future request knowledge.

=== Network design and optimization ===
Rouskas' research on network design and optimization has specifically concentrated on solving a variety of optical design problems. He developed a novel ILP (integer linear program) formulation for network optimization, improving scalability and achieving optimal solutions for large-scale SONET ring instances. During an interview with Matt Shipman from CSC News at NC State University, he commented, "The model could solve problems more than 10,000 times faster when data is routed through larger rings, in the network," and "This will significantly shorten the cycle of feedback and re-design for existing rings". He tackled scalability and wavelength fragmentation in the traffic grooming problem with a decomposition approach. By separating the problem into virtual topology and traffic routing (VTTR) and routing with wavelength assignment subproblems, an efficient solution was attained using a partial linear programming relaxation algorithm. Furthermore, he conducted an extensive review of network virtualization approaches, offering a comprehensive perspective and unified definition.

=== Optical networks and system ===
Rouskas has researched optical networks and systems, particularly emphasizing on optical burst switching. In the early 2000s, he evaluated optical packet switching and optical burst switching techniques for IP traffic transport, highlighting the need for viable optical buffering technology. He introduced a core dense wavelength-division multiplexing (DWDM) network architecture, merging optical burst switching with just-in-time signaling, offering simplicity, hardware implementability, and native multicast support. His further research addressed the challenge of constructing multicast trees in high-speed packet-switched environments for real-time interactive applications; this highly cited study put forward a heuristic effectively minimizing maximum inter-destination delay variation. In related research, he aimed to provide QoS guarantees in Grid systems through advance reservation of network resources. This work presented efficient scheduling algorithms to handle resource fragmentation, extending it to implement the Best-Fit Algorithm, which demonstrated effectiveness in achieving user and system objectives. Moreover, he has contributed to topics such as traffic grooming, optical layer multicast, and spectrum management techniques in elastic optical networks.

=== Performance modeling ===
With a research focus on performance modeling, Rouskas presented a queueing network model for edge OBS nodes, enabling the analysis of edge switch performance under different scenarios. In collaboration with Lisong Xu and Harry G. Perros, he developed accurate approximate algorithms validated through numerical results. Furthermore, together with Ramesh Krishnamurthy, he analyzed the performance of OpenSIPS, collecting data on the SPS performance under various call arrival rates and inter-arrival time distributions. They modeled the SPS as an M/G/1 queue, considering a cache-miss overhead parameter.

== Awards and honors ==
- 1997 – Career Award, National Science Foundation (NSF)
- 2007 – IBM Faculty Award
- 2010–2011 – Distinguished Lecturer, IEEE
- 2010 – Outstanding Service Award, IEEE GLOBECOM
- 2012 – Fellow, Institute of Electrical and Electronics Engineers (IEEE)
- 2019 – Outstanding Service Award, Optical Networking Technical Committee (ONTC), IEEE Communication Society

== Bibliography ==
=== Books ===
- Next-generation Internet Architectures and Protocols (2010) ISBN 9780511925207
- Internet Tiered Services: Theory, Economics, and Quality of Service (2010) ISBN 9781441935274
- Traffic Grooming for Optical Networks: Foundations, Techniques and Frontiers (2008) ISBN 9780387745183

=== Selected articles ===
- Rouskas, G. N., & Baldine, I. (1996, March). Multicast routing with end-to-end delay and delay variation constraints. In Proceedings of IEEE INFOCOM'96. Conference on Computer Communications (Vol. 1, pp. 353–360). IEEE.
- Xu, L., Perros, H. G., & Rouskas, G. (2001). Techniques for optical packet switching and optical burst switching. IEEE communications Magazine, 39(1), 136–142.
- Dutta, R., & Rouskas, G. N. (2002). Traffic grooming in WDM networks: Past and future. IEEE network, 16(6), 46–56.
- Baldine, I., Rouskas, G. N., Perros, H. G., & Stevenson, D. (2002). JumpStart: A just-in-time signaling architecture for WDM burst-switched networks. IEEE communications magazine, 40(2), 82–89.
- Rouskas, G. N. (2003). Optical layer multicast: rationale, building blocks, and challenges. IEEE network, 17(1), 60–65.
- Rouskas, G. N. (2023). A symmetry-free spectrum allocation heuristic for elastic optical networks. Optical Switching and Networking, 100742.
