= Abbas Jamalipour =

Abbas Jamalipour received a PhD from Nagoya University, Nagoya, Japan. He is a professor of Ubiquitous Mobile Networking with the School of Electrical and Information Engineering, University of Sydney, Australia.

He is a Fellow of the Institute of Electrical and Electronics Engineers (IEEE) for contributions to next generation networks for traffic control; a Fellow of the Institute of Electrical, Information, and Communication Engineers (IEICE) for contributions to design and development of mobile wireless communication networks; a Fellow of the Institute of Engineers Australia; an IEEE Distinguished Lecturer; and a Technical Editor of several scholarly journals.

He has been an organizer or the chair of several international conferences, including the IEEE International Conference on Communications and the IEEE Global Communications Conference and the IEEE Wireless Communications and Networking Conference. He is the Vice President – Conferences and a member of Board of Governors of the IEEE Communications Society (ComSoc).

He is the recipient of several awards, including the 2010 IEEE ComSoc Harold Sobol Award for Exemplary Service to Meetings and Conferences, the 2006 IEEE ComSoc Satellite Technical Committee Award - "Distinguished Contribution to Satellite Communications", and the 2006 IEEE ComSoc Best Tutorial Paper Award. He is one of the most cited researchers in the field of mobile, cellular, and satellite networks with over 18,000 citations (h-index: 58, i10-index: 261).

He was candidate for the position of IEEE Communication Society Vice-president Publications in 2013.
