= Shugong Xu =

Electrical engineer

Shugong Xu from Intel Research, Santa Clara, CA was named Fellow of the Institute of Electrical and Electronics Engineers (IEEE) in 2016 for contributions to the improvement of wireless networks efficiency.
