= Yutaka Yasuda =

Japanese business executive

- Born: Japan
- Education: Kyoto University
- Known for: satellite communications
- Awards: IEICE Fellow; IEEE Fellow; IEICE Honorary Member; IEICE Distinguished Achievement Award
- Scientific career
- Fields: Electrical Engineering; Telecommunications
- Workplaces: KDDI Corporation, Japan; KDDI Foundation, Japan; ABIT Corporation, Japan

Yutaka Yasuda (安田 豊) is currently an independent director at Abit cooperations, Japan. Previously, he was Chairman of KDDI R&D Laboratories, Japan and a VP and GM at KDDI Corporation, Japan.

== Early life ==
Born in Japan, Yutaka was educated at Kyoto University Japan, receiving his B.E. and M.E. degrees in Electrical Engineering in 1973 and 1975. He received his Ph.D. in communications engineering from Kyoto University in 1984.

== Career ==
After his Ph.D., Yutaka joined KDDI R&D Laboratories, undertaking research in electronics, mobile and satellite communications. He became Chairman of KDDI R&D Laboratories in 2011. He was also a vice president and GM of KDDI Corporation. In 2014, he became President of KDDI Foundation, Japan.

== Awards ==
Yutaka received the IEICE Distinguished Achievement Award in 1999. He was elected an IEICE Fellow in 2005 and IEEE Fellow in 2008. He was awarded the Honorary Member of IEICE, Japan in 2015 for his achievements in electronics, communications, and information engineering.
