= Nuria González Prelcic =

Spanish electrical engineer

Nuria González Prelcic is a Spanish electrical engineer focusing on signal processing and MIMO architectures for millimeter-wave communications, with applications including wireless sensor networks and vehicular ad hoc networks. She is a professor of electrical and computer engineering at the University of California, San Diego.

== Education and career ==
González received a master's degree from the University of Vigo in 1993, and completed a Ph.D. there in 1998, both in telecommunications engineering. Her doctoral dissertation, Adaptive time-frequency decompositions based on wavelets, was supervised by Domingo Docampo.

She continued at the University of Vigo, as an associate professor from 2002 to 2020. In 2020 she moved to the US, becoming an associate professor of electrical and computer engineering at North Carolina State University. She took her present position as professor of electrical and computer engineering in the University of California, San Diego in 2024.

== Recognition ==
González was named a distinguished lecturer of the IEEE Vehicular Technology Society for 2024–2026. She was named to the 2025 class of IEEE Fellows "for contributions to millimeter wave wireless communications".
