= Yuanyuan Yang =

Chinese-American computer scientist

Yuanyuan Yang is a Chinese-American computer scientist whose interests include parallel and distributed computing, wireless sensor networks, and cloud computing. She is SUNY Distinguished Professor of Electrical & Computer Engineering and Computer Science at Stony Brook University, Associate Dean for Diversity and Academic Affairs in the Stony Brook College of Engineering and Applied Sciences. From 2018 - 2022, she was a program director for software and hardware foundations and principles and practice of scalable systems at the National Science Foundation.

== Education and career ==
Yang earned bachelor's and master's degrees in computer science and engineering at Tsinghua University in 1982 and 1984, respectively. She completed a Ph.D. in computer science at Johns Hopkins University in 1992. She moved to Stony Brook in 1999, from a previous faculty position at the University of Vermont.

== Recognition ==
Yang was named an IEEE Fellow in 2009 "for contributions to parallel and distributed computing systems". She was named SUNY Distinguished Professor in 2016. In 2022 she won the Outstanding Service Award of the IEEE Computer Society Technical Committee on Distributed Processing.
