= Krishna Narayanan =

Computer engineer

Krishna Narayanan is a computer engineer and Eric D. Rubin '06 Professor at Texas A&M University in College Station, Texas and at the Simons Institute for the Theory of Computing of the University of California, Berkeley.

He was named a Fellow of the Institute of Electrical and Electronics Engineers (IEEE) in 2015 for his contributions to coding for wireless communications and data storage.

Narayanan obtained B.S. in electrical engineering from Coimbatore Institute of Technology in 1992. He then immigrated to the United States where until 1994 he attended Iowa State University, where he graduated with a M.S. in electrical engineering. He then pursued further studies, by enrolling into a Ph.D. program at Georgia tech, graduating from it with that degree in 1998.
