= Chiara Petrioli =

Italian computer scientist

Chiara Petrioli is an Italian computer scientist whose research interests include mobile computing, wireless networks, sensor networks, and underwater acoustic communication. She is a professor of computer science and engineering at Sapienza University of Rome, and director of the university's Sensor Networks and Embedded Systems (SENSES) Laboratory.

Petrioli was a student at Sapienza University, earning a bachelor's degree and Ph.D. there, before becoming a professor at the same university. She was named an IEEE Fellow, in the 2021 class of fellows, "for contributions to wireless and underwater networks". She won the GammaDonna 2022 Award for innovative female entrepreneurship of the Intesa Sanpaolo Innovation Center, for her work with startup company WSense.
