= Sanjoy Paul =

American computer scientist

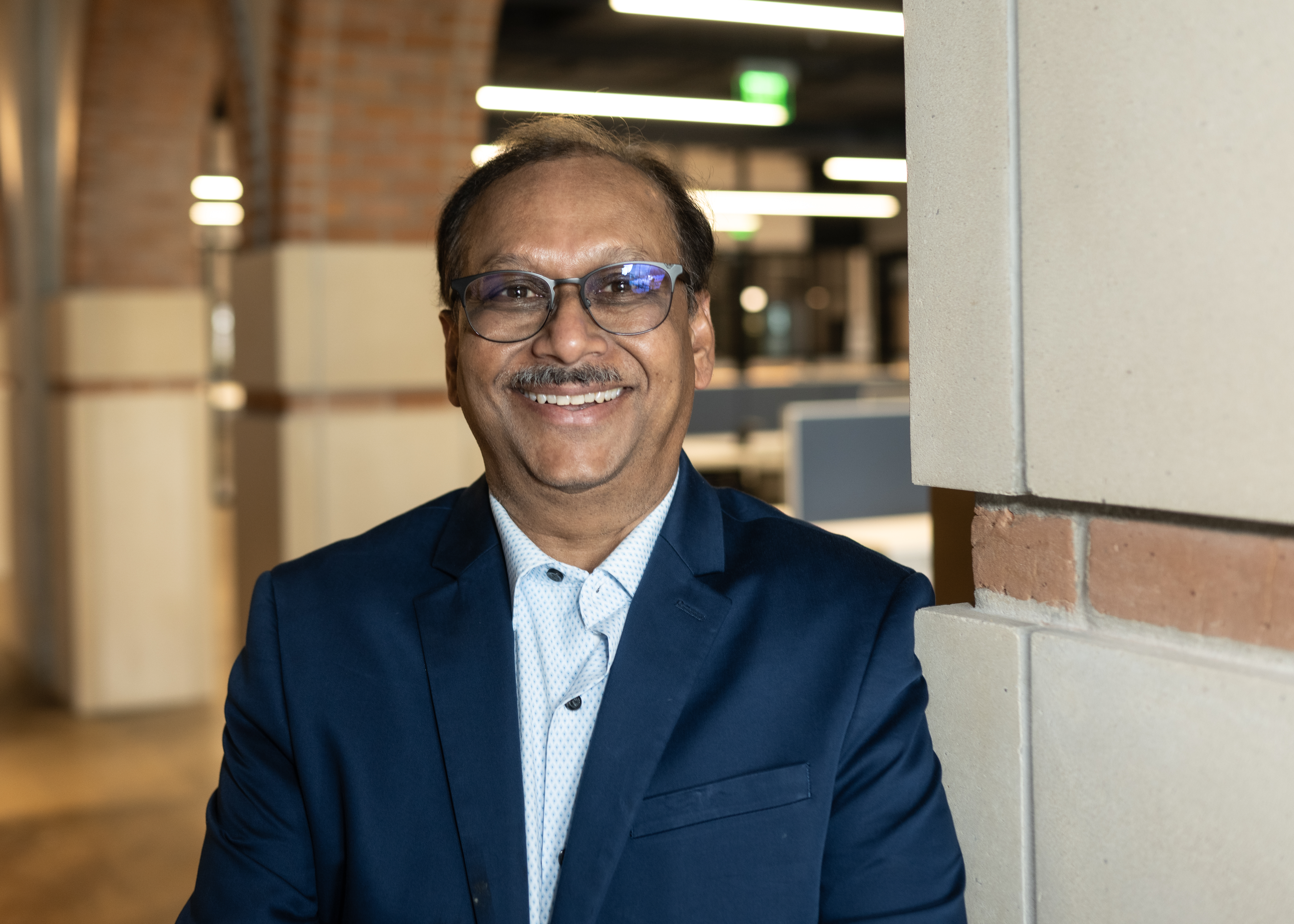
- Born: January 22, 1962 (age 64)
- Alma mater: Indian Institute of Technology Kharagpur, Wharton Business School
- Known for: Internet of things (IoT), Artificial intelligence/Machine learning (AI/ML), Computer network
- Awards: Fellow of Institute of Electrical and Electronics Engineers, Thomas Alva Edison Patent Award, IEEE William R. Bennett Award
- Scientific career
- Workplaces: San Jose State University, Rice University, Rutgers University

Sanjoy Paul (born January 22, 1962) is an Indian-American computer scientist. He is the Executive Director of Rice Nexus, Rice University's startup incubator. His research spans computer networking, distributed systems, multimedia communication, and emerging digital technologies, including artificial intelligence and Internet of Things (IoT) applications. He is a Fellow of the Institute of Electrical and Electronics Engineers (IEEE) and a Fellow of the National Academy of Inventors (NAI).

== Early life and education ==
Paul received a Bachelor of Technology (Honours) in Electronics and Telecommunications Engineering from the Indian Institute of Technology Kharagpur in 1985. He subsequently pursued graduate studies at the University of Maryland, College Park, where he earned a Master of Science in Computer Science in 1988 and a Ph.D. in Electrical Engineering and Computer Science in 1992.

Paul later completed a Master of Business Administration at the Wharton School of the University of Pennsylvania between 2003 and 2005.

== Career ==
Paul was one of the youngest IEEE Fellows and served as an editor of IEEE/ACM Transactions on Networking, guest editor of IEEE Network Special Issue on Multicasting, steering committee member of IEEE COMSNETS (Communication Systems & Networks), general chair of International Conference on Distributed Computing and Networking (ICDCN) 2011, Internet Multimedia Services Architecture and Application (IMSAA) 2010, and COMSWARE (Conference on Communication System software and Middleware) 2007, Technical Program Chair of COMSWARE 2006, and as a Technical Program Committee Member of several IEEE and ACM International.

Paul's research has covered computer networking and distributed systems, including multicast communication, network monitoring, wireless networks, wireless sensor networks, and security in networked systems.

== Awards and honors ==
- IEEE William R. Bennett Prize Paper Award, 1997
- Fellow of the Institute of Electrical and Electronics Engineers (FIEEE), 2004
- Fellow of the Institution of Engineering and Technology (IET), 2010
- Fellow of the National Academy of Inventors, 2025
- Fellow of the International Academy of Artificial Intelligence Sciences (AAIS), 2026

== Selected publications ==
=== Books ===
- 1998 - Multicasting on the Internet and its Applications.
- 2010 - Digital Video Distribution in Broadband, Television, Mobile and Converged Networks: Trends, Challenges, and Solutions.

=== Articles ===
- Vuppala, Sunil K.; Padmanabh, Kumar; Bose, Sumit Kumar; Paul, Sanjoy (January 2011). "Incorporating fairness within Demand response programs in smart grid". Isgt 2011. pp. 1–9. doi:10.1109/ISGT.2011.5759138. ISBN 978-1-61284-218-9. S2CID 23046724.
- Dhanapal, Karthikeyan Balaji; Sankaran, Siva; Somasundara, Arun Agrahara; Paul, Sanjoy (July 2012). "WindTunnel: A Tool for Network Impact Testing of Mobile Applications". 2012 Annual SRII Global Conference. pp. 34–43. doi:10.1109/SRII.2012.15. ISBN 978-1-4673-2318-5. S2CID 21328047.
- Dhanapal, Karthikeyan Balaji; Deepak, K. Sai; Sharma, Saurabh; Joglekar, Sagar Prakash; Narang, Aditya; Vashistha, Aditya; Salunkhe, Paras; Rai, Harikrishna G.N.; Somasundara, Arun Agrahara; Paul, Sanjoy (July 2012). "An Innovative System for Remote and Automated Testing of Mobile Phone Applications". 2012 Annual SRII Global Conference. pp. 44–54. doi:10.1109/SRII.2012.16. ISBN 978-1-4673-2318-5. S2CID 31514849.
- Vashistha, Aditya; Nallusamy, Rajarathnam; Das, Amitabha; Paul, Sanjoy (July 2010). "Watermarking video content using visual cryptography and scene averaged image". 2010 IEEE International Conference on Multimedia and Expo. pp. 1641–1646. doi:10.1109/ICME.2010.5583256. ISBN 978-1-4244-7491-2. S2CID 30253455.
