= Jianzhong Zhang =

Electrical engineer

Jianzhong Zhang is an electrical engineer with Samsung Research America in Mountain View, California. He was named a Fellow of the Institute of Electrical and Electronics Engineers (IEEE) in 2016 for his leadership in the standardization of cellular systems.
