= Fred Heismann =

Electrical engineer

Fred Heismann is an electrical engineer at JDS Uniphase Corp. in Colts Neck, New Jersey. He was named a Fellow of the Institute of Electrical and Electronics Engineers (IEEE) in 2014 for his contributions to understanding, control of, and mitigation of polarization effects in fiberoptic communication systems.
