= Dominique Schreurs =

Belgian microwave engineer

Dominique M. M.-P. Schreurs is a Belgian microwave engineer whose research interests range from the accurate computer simulation of microwave components to the applications of microwaves in wearable health monitoring devices. She is a professor in the Faculty of Engineering Science at KU Leuven, the former editor-in-chief of IEEE Transactions on Microwave Theory and Techniques, and the former president of the IEEE Microwave Theory and Techniques Society.

== Education and career ==
Schreurs is the daughter of two teachers. As was typical at the time in Belgium, Schreurs attended a gender-segregated school, which did not provide the mathematics enrichment that was available at the boys' schools. Nevertheless, she studied both mathematics and Latin in her high school, the only student to do so, and passed the university entrance exam for engineering. With the encouragement of her parents, she studied electronic engineering at KU Leuven, earning a master's degree there in 1992 and completing her Ph.D. in 1997.

She was a postdoctoral researcher with Agilent Technologies, ETH Zurich, and the National Institute of Standards and Technology. She has been on the faculty at KU Leuven since 1997, and is a full professor there. She chairs the Leuven Centre on Information and Communication Technology.

She was editor-in-chief of IEEE Transactions on Microwave Theory and Techniques from 2014 to 2016, and was president of the IEEE Microwave Theory and Techniques Society beginning in 2018, serving as its first female president. Already elected as president for the 2019 term, she took office early after the unexpected death of the previous president, Thomas J. Brazil.

== Books ==
Schreurs is the author or coauthor of:

- RF Power Amplifier Behavioral Modeling (Cambridge University Press, 2008)
- Microwave and Wireless Measurement Techniques (with Nuno Borges Carvalho, Cambridge University Press, 2013)

Her edited volumes include:

- Transistor Level Modeling for Analog/RF IC Design (with W. Grabinski and B. Nauwelaers, Springer, 2006)
- Microwave De-embedding: From Theory to Applications (with Giovanni Crupi, Academic Press, 2014)
- Principles and Applications of RF/Microwave in Healthcare and Biosensing (with Changzhi Li, Mohammad-Reza Tofighi, and Tzyy-Sheng Jason Horng, Academic Press, 2017)

== Recognition ==
Schreurs was elected as an IEEE Fellow in 2012, "for contributions to nonlinear vectorial measurement-based experimental design and modeling".
