= Gaurav Sharma (engineer) =

Data scientist

Gaurav Sharma from the University of Rochester, Rochester, New York was named Fellow of the Institute of Electrical and Electronics Engineers (IEEE) in 2013 for "contributions to electronic imaging and media security".
