= Ephraim Zehavi =

Israeli engineer

Professor Ephraim Zehavi (Hebrew: אפרים זהבי) is an Israeli researcher in communication theory and coding theory. He was one of the founders of the Faculty of Engineering at Bar-Ilan University and later served as its dean (2014-2019). He was one of the inventors of CDMA alongside Andrew Viterbi and Jack Wolf. He is currently Professor Emeritus at Bar-Ilan University.

== Biography career ==
Ephraim Zehavi received the B.Sc. and M.Sc. degrees in Electrical Engineering from the Technion, in 1977 and 1981, respectively, and a Ph.D. in Electrical Engineering from the University of Massachusetts Amherst in 1987. Ephi worked at RAFAEL as a communication researcher until 1982, when he left Israel to pursue his studies.

In 1985, he joined Qualcomm and took part in developing high-speed Viterbi/Trellis Decoders and conducting R&D on satellite communication systems. In his 12 years at Qualcomm, he contributed to the company’s leading projects, including CDMA, 3G cellular technology, and Globalstar. His last position there was General Manager of Qualcomm Israel.

He left Qualcomm to found Mobilian in 1998, a communications startup solving Bluetooth and WLAN coexistence issues. Mobilian was acquired by Intel in 2003.

In 2003, he returned to academia to help build the School of Engineering at Bar-Ilan University, serving as vice-head before being appointed dean in 2014.

== Professional Recognition ==
- IEEE Stephen O. Rice Award (1994): Co-recipient of this prestigious award in telecommunications engineering.
- IEEE Fellow of the IEEE Communications Society (2013): Elected for significant contributions to pragmatic coding techniques and bit-interleaving methodologies.

== Patents ==
Prof. Zehavi has been granted over 40 patents in specialized areas of telecommunications and coding, including:

- Coding technologies
- CDMA (Code Division Multiple Access) technology
- Wireless Local Area Network (WLAN) technologies
- Coexistence strategies for multiple wireless networks
