= Elvino Silveira Sousa =

Electrical engineer

Elvino Silveira Sousa is a Professor of Electrical Engineering Professor and Jeffrey Skoll Chair in Computer Networks and Innovation at the University of Toronto, Ontario. He is a recipient of the Queen Elizabeth II Golden Jubilee Medal and in 2012 was named a Fellow of the Institute of Electrical and Electronics Engineers (IEEE) for his contributions to wireless systems, including modulation techniques and transmitter diversity.

Sousa got his B.A.Sc. in engineering science and the M.A.Sc. in electrical engineering from the University of Toronto in 1980 and 1982, respectively. After obtaining Ph.D. in electrical engineering from the University of Southern California in 1985, Sousa worked at the Department of Electrical and Computer Engineering of the University of Toronto.
