= Masayuki Tanimoto =

Electrical engineer

Masayuki Tanimoto is an electrical engineer from Nagoya University, Japan. He was named a Fellow of the Institute of Electrical and Electronics Engineers (IEEE) in 2013 for his contributions to the development of free viewpoint television and its MPEG standard.
