= List of fellows of IEEE Computational Intelligence Society =

In the Institute of Electrical and Electronics Engineers, a small number of members are designated as fellows for having made significant accomplishments to the field. The IEEE Fellows are grouped by the institute according to their membership in the member societies of the institute. This list is of IEEE Fellows from the IEEE Computational Intelligence Society (IEEE-CIS).

Year	Fellow	Citation
1978	Jerry Mendel	For contributions to system identification, state estimation, and their application to aerospace technology
1983	George Lindaris	For conceiving, developing and implementing the use of sampled optical diffraction patterns for image analysis
1990	Mohamed E. El-Hawary	For contributions to the theory of optimal economic operation of hydrothermal power systems
1996	Jacek M. Zurada	For contributions to engineering education in the area of neural networks
1996	Nikolaos Bourbakis	For contributions to digital image scanning algorithms
1996	Fathi Salem	For contributions to the development of tools for the analysis and design of nonlinear and chaotic circuits and systems
1996	David Yevick	For contributions to the numerical simulation of guided-wave components and devices and to the theory of optical processes in semiconductors
1997	Lee Giles	For contributions to the theory and practice of neural networks
1998	Yasuo Matsuyama	For contributions to learning algorithms with competition
1999	David B. Fogel	For contributions to the scientific advancement of evolutionary computation
2000	Erkki Oja	For contributions to the theory and applications of artificial neural networks
2000	Jose Principe	For development of the gamma neural model and for its applications in signal processing
2000	John Yen	For contributions to fuzzy logic, model identifications, soft computing, artificial intelligence, and reasoning under uncertainty
2001	Bidyut Baran Chaudhuri	For contributions to pattern recognition, especially Indian language script OCR, document processing and natural language processing
2001	Vincenzo Piuri	For contributions to neural network techniques and embedded digital architectures for industrial applications
2001	Russell C. Eberhart	For contributions to the computational intelligence field, including particle swarm optimization and diagnostic systems.
2003	Okyay Kaynak	For contributions to variable structure systems theory and its applications in mechatronics
2003	Bhavani Thuraisingham	For contributions to secure systems involving database systems, distributed systems, and the web
2005	Rudolf Kruse	For contributions to fuzzy learning, theory and applications
2005	Innocent Kamwa	For contributions to the identification of synchronous generator models and innovations in power grid control
2005	Zhengyou Zhang	For contributions to robust computer vision techniques
2005	Donald Wunsch	For contributions to hardware implementations of reinforcement and unsupervised learning
2006	Janusz Kacprzyk	For contributions to use of fuzzy logic in decision making and control
2006	Sally L. Wood	For contributions to engineering education at university and pre-college levels
2006	Marco Dorigo	For contributions to ant colony optimization and swarm intelligence
2006	Gary S. May	For contributions to semiconductor manufacturing and engineering education
2006	Andrew Barto	For contributions to reinforcement learning methods and their neural network implementations
2006	Ulrich Reimers	For contributions to the development of Digital Video Broadcasting (DVB).
2007	Melba Crawford	For applications of satellite data and airborne LIDAR imagery
2007	Grace Clark	For contributions in block adaptive filtering
2007	Hans-Paul Schwefel	For contributions to evolutionary computation
2007	Annamária Várkonyi-Kóczy	For contributions to digital signal processing in measurement and control
2007	Chen Kunshan	For contributions to remote sensing image and signal processing
2008	Pau-Choo Chung	For contributions to neural network models for biomedical image analyses
2008	Jennie Si	For contributions to approximate dynamic programming, and to the analysis and synthesis of neural networks
2009	Juyang Weng	For contributions to computer vision and pattern recognition
2010	Nikola Kasabov	For the applications of neural networks and hybrid systems in computational intelligence
2010	Shunpei Yamazaki	For contributions to, and leadership in the industrialization of non-volatile memory and thin film transistor technologies
2011	Chih-Jen Lin	For contributions to support vector machine algorithms and software
2011	Bernadette Bouchon-Meunier	For contributions to theoretical foundations for reasoning and applications to practical devices
2011	Carlos Artemio Coello Coello	For contributions to multi-objective optimization and constraint-handling techniques
2012	Gerard Dreyfus	For contributions to machine learning and its applications
2012	Sushmita Mitra	For contributions to neuro-fuzzy and hybrid approaches in pattern recognition
2012	Marimuthu Palaniswami	For contributions to computational intelligence, learning systems, and nonlinear modeling
2012	Jagath Chandana Rajapakse	For contributions to computational techniques for magnetic resonance imaging
2012	Hao Ying	For contributions to theory and biomedical applications of fuzzy control
2012	Gary B. Fogel	For contributions to computational intelligence and its application to biology, chemistry, and medicine
2013	Enrico Bocchieri	For contributions to computational models for speech recognition
2013	Hani Hagras	For contributions to fuzzy systems
2013	Ron Sun	For contributions to cognitive architectures and computations
2013	Jon George Rokne	For contributions to computer graphics and geographic information systems
2013	Jacek Błażewicz	For contributions to combinatorial models of task scheduling
2013	Fred W. Glover	For contributions to computer based optimization
2013	Akira Hirose	For contributions to theory and radar applications of complex-valued neural networks
2013	Danilo Mandic	For contributions to multivariate and nonlinear learning systems
2013	Bayya Yegnanarayana	For contributions to digital signal processing research and education
2014	Kazuo Tanaka	For contributions to fuzzy control system design and analysis
2014	Hisao Ishibuchi	For contributions to evolutionary multiobjective optimization and fuzzy rule-based classifier design
2014	Yi Lu Murphey	For contributions to optimal energy control in hybrid electric vehicles
2015	Stefanos Kollias	For contributions to intelligent systems for multimedia content analysis and human-machine interaction
2015	Henry Leung	For contributions to chaotic communications and nonlinear signal processing
2015	Dipankar Dasgupta	For contributions to immunological computation and bio-inspired cyber security
2015	Rasheek Rifaat	For contributions to protection of industrial power systems
2015	P. N. Suganthan	For contributions to optimization using evolutionary and swarm algorithms
2015	Johan Suykens	For developing the least squares support vector machines
2015	Michel Verleysen	For contributions to high-dimensional analysis and manifold learning
2015	Huaguang Zhang	For contributions to stability analysis of recurrent neural networks and intelligent control of nonlinear systems
2016	Sanghamitra Bandyopadhyay	For contributions to genetic algorithm based classification and clustering techniques
2016	Jinde Cao	For contributions to the analysis of neural networks
2016	Fernando Gomide	For contributions to fuzzy systems
2016	Risto Miikkulainen	For contributions to neural and evolutionary computation
2016	Yuhui Shi	For contributions to particle swarm optimization algorithms
2016	Thomas Stuetzle	For contributions to the design and engineering of heuristic optimization algorithms
2016	Shugong Xu	For contributions to the improvement of wireless networks efficiency
2017	Saman Halgamuge	For contributions to computational intelligence in bioinformatics and mechatronics
2017	Alice E. Smith	For contributions to computational intelligence for complex systems
2018	Jonathan How	For contributions to guidance and control of air and space vehicles
2018	Konstantina Nikita	For contributions to bioelectromagnetics and implantable antennas for medical applications
2018	Hava Siegelmann	For contributions to neural computation
2019	Kerstin Dautenhahn	For contributions to social robotics and human-robot interaction
2019	Tingwen Huang	For contributions to dynamical analysis of neural networks
2019	Carme Torras	For contributions to learning algorithms for robot perception, planning and manipulation
2019	Zhaohui Wu	For contributions to intelligent service computing
2019	Min Wu	For contribution to control and automation for complex systems
2020	Ujjwal Maulik	For development of algorithms in evolutionary clustering and bioinformatics
2020	Hussein Abbass	For contributions to evolutionary learning and optimization
2020	Krzysztof Cios	For contributions to data mining and machine learning
2021	Enrique Herrera Viedma	For contributions to fuzzy decision systems and linguistic modeling
2022	Humberto Bustince	For contributions to information fusion under uncertainty
2022	Nitesh Chawla	For contributions to learning from imbalanced data and heterogeneous graphs
2022	Dongmei Wang	For contributions to biomedical informatics and AI
2022	Chunhua Yang	For contributions in intelligent control and optimization of complex industrial processes
2023	Houbing Song	For contributions to big data analytics and integration of AI with Internet of Things
2023	Yike Guo	For contributions to data mining and its applications
2023	Houbing Song	For contributions to big data analytics and integration of AI with Internet of Things
2023	Jianping Wang	For contributions to resiliency of complex systems
2024	Bing Xue	For contributions to evolutionary deep learning
2024	Georgios N. Yannakakis	For contributions to affective computing and artificial intelligence applied to games
2025	Julian Togelius	For contributions to procedural content generation and artificial intelligence in video games
2026	Aleksandra Faust	For contributions to technical leadership in scalable learning-based autonomy and foundation models
2026	Jing Liang	For contributions to evolutionary computation for complex optimization and its real-world applications
2026	Rong Qu	For contributions to automated evolutionary algorithms in combinatorial optimisation
2026	Zhijun Zhang	For contributions to optimized computation and intelligent planning in robotics
2026	Shengxiang Yang	For contributions to evolutionary computation for dynamic and multi-objective optimization problems

== See also ==
- List of IEEE Fellows
