= Várkonyi =

Várkonyi is a popular, widely used Hungarian surname.

It is based on the village name "Várkony", that is a derivative of the Avar people in their form of "uar". In Hungarian this ethnic group name is also known as "várkonyok" based on the Old-Greek pronunciation. At the end of the 18th century, all persons had to select a surname in Hungary. Some of them picked up their names based on their village of origin. There are multiple villages in historical Hungary with this name:

- Tiszavárkony, Heves county
- Nyékvárkony, Pozsony county
- Zengővárkony, Baranya county
- Sajóvárkony, Borsod county (part of Ózd since 1940)

This surname became very popular once change of the surname was allowed. Dozens of persons both in the 19th and 20th century changed their original surnames to Várkonyi. This name was also used as a noble alias name written as "várkonyi" before the surname. The most famous usage was for the Amadé baron/count family, that has some origins in Nyékvárkony.

There were some disputes and court trials on the use of this family name. Based on court decision, the Nyitra-Páruczai family had to change to a shortened "Várkony" surname.

Persons with this surname include:

- Annamária Várkonyi-Kóczy (born 1957), Hungarian electrical engineer
- Hildebrand Dezső Várkonyi (1888–1971), Hungarian monk, philosopher, pedagogue and psychologist
- László Várkonyi (1909–1972), Hungarian table tennis player
- Mátyás Várkonyi (born 1950), Hungarian music composer
- Mihály Várkonyi, birth name of Victor Varconi (1891–1976), Hungarian actor
- Péter Várkonyi (1931–2008), Hungarian politician
- Robert Varkonyi (born 1961), American poker player
- Zoltán Várkonyi (1912–1979), Hungarian actor and film director
