= Bayya =

Bayya (Telugu: బయ్యా) is a Telugu surname. Notable people with the surname include:

- Bayya Suryanarayana Murthy (1906–1979), parliamentarian
- Bayya Narasimheswara Sarma (1867–1932), Indian independence activist
- Bayya Yegnanarayana, Indian engineer

Bayya - බයියා is a noun used to represent peoples from rural village which they have significant difference in behaviors compared to people near by high residential cities in the country.
