= Henry Leung =

Henry Leung may refer to:

- Henry Leung (engineer), from the University of Calgary, Alberta, Canada
- Henry Leung (squash player) (born 1995), Hong Kong professional squash player
