= Liang Jing =

Liang Jing or Jing Liang may refer to:

- Jing Liang (computer scientist), Chinese professor
- Liang Jing (actress) (born 1972), Chinese actress
- Liang Jing (runner) (1989–2021), Chinese ultramarathon runner
- Liang Jing (cyclist) (born 1985), Chinese track cyclist
- Eileen Chang (1920-1995), Chinese-American writer also known as Liang Jing
