= Jennie Si =

Chinese-American electrical engineer

- Born: 1963 (age 62–63)
- Other name: Jie Si
- Education: Tsinghua University (BS, MS); University of Notre Dame (PhD)
- Honors: IEEE Fellow
- Scientific career
- Institutions: Arizona State University
- Thesis: Analysis and Synthesis of Discrete-Time Recurrent Neural Networks With High Order Nonlinearities (1992)
- Doctoral advisor: Anthony N. Michel

Jennie Si (born 1963, also published as Jie Si) is a Chinese and American electrical engineer and computer scientist whose research involves approximate dynamic programming in control theory, neural networks, reinforcement learning, and wearable robotics. She is a professor in the School of Electrical, Computer and Energy Engineering at Arizona State University.

== Education and career ==
Si was a student at Tsinghua University, where she received a bachelor's degree in 1985 and a master's degree in 1988. She completed her Ph.D. at the University of Notre Dame in 1992, with the dissertation Analysis and Synthesis of Discrete-Time Recurrent Neural Networks With High Order Nonlinearities supervised by Anthony N. Michel.

She joined Arizona State University as an assistant professor of electrical engineering in 1991, and was promoted to full professor in 2000.

== Recognition ==
Si was named as an IEEE Fellow in 2008, "for contributions to approximate dynamic programming, and to the analysis and synthesis of neural networks".
