= TV Universitária Rio Grande do Norte =

TV Universitária Rio Grande do Norte (ZYP 304)
- Natal, Rio Grande do Norte; Brazil
- Channels: Digital: 48 (UHF); Virtual: 5
- Branding: TVU RN

Programming
- Affiliations: TV Brasil

Ownership
- Owner: Superintendência de Comunicação da UFRN; (UFRN)
- Sister stations: Universitaria FM

History
- First air date: December 2, 1972
- Former call signs: ZYJ 20; ZYB 565
- Former channel numbers: Analog: 5 (VHF, 1987–2018)
- Former affiliations: TV Cultura (1975-2004); TVE Brasil (1975-2007)

Technical information
- Licensing authority: ANATEL
- ERP: 0.90 kW
- Transmitter coordinates: 5°48′49.1″S 35°11′41.6″W

Links
- Public license information: Profile
- Website: tvu.ufrn.br

TV Universitária Rio Grande do Norte (channel 11, also simply known as TV Universitária or TVU RN) is a Brazilian television station based in Natal, capital of the state of Rio Grande do Norte serving as an affiliated of TV Brasil for the entire state. Of an educational nature, it is subordinate to the Communication Superintendence (COMUNICA) of the Federal University of Rio Grande do Norte, which also includes the FM Universitária radio station and the Communication Agency (Agecom). The station's headquarters are on the UFRN university campus, in the Lagoa Nova neighborhood, and its transmission antenna is on Morro Nova Descoberta, in Parque das Dunas.

== History ==
Founded on December 2, 1972, being one of the oldest educational television stations in Brazil and the pioneer in the state of Rio Grande do Norte, TV Universitária, channel 5, is a broadcaster from the Federal University of Rio Grande do Norte, affiliated with Rede Pública de Televisão (ABEPEC), retransmitting TV Brasil and TV Cultura's programming. Initially created to serve the Saci project, for distance learning in schools in the state basic education network, TVU, as it is known, has a rich history.

In the beginning, it was linked to INPE (National Institute for Space Research) and focused almost exclusively on the production of tele-classes and programs for early childhood education. To this end, it had considerable coverage, covering several cities in the interior, with the exception of the Serra de Martins region, given the region's difficult geographical conditions. It also built the first terrestrial TV transmission structure in RN, made up of several towers strategically located in mountains (some still used today by commercial broadcasters), which received UHF and retransmitted the signal to the interior through channel 5. Some schools, from so far away, they received it with the use of batteries. To operate this entire system, the broadcaster had a huge team of technicians who traveled in jeeps throughout the state.

Over time, TVU diversified its programming, including series, music, sports and news programs. It also separated itself from INPE and began operating on Rua Princesa Isabel, in the center of Natal, in a building that today houses the Cultural Training Center of the Federal Institute of Education, Science and Technology of Rio Grande do Norte (IFRN). Arnon de Andrade was the first general director of TVU when it became the responsibility of UFRN. As its programming consisted predominantly of local productions and some programs brought on tape, TVU functioned as a true television industry, buzzing all the time with the traffic of actors, musicians, journalists and popular people who made up the auditoriums. There, several programs that marked an era in Rio Grande do Norte television were produced, such as Canta Nordeste, RN Notícias and Memória Viva (shown to this day). Some professionals and important characters from the local scene also visited there, such as the late senator Carlos Alberto.

In the mid-80s, the broadcaster went into crisis. There was a lack of resources to maintain the entire transmission structure inside, causing coverage to decrease. Program production was also compromised and the technology park became obsolete. Channel 5 remained on the air in the capital in an almost precarious manner, benefiting from the inauguration of Sinred, a system of educational broadcasters, led by TVE from Rio de Janeiro, which maintained unique programming via satellite on the network. During this period, a few programs remained on the air, such as De Bar em Bar, Memória Viva, Repórter Cidade and Santa Missa.

In the 1990s, TVU began a new phase. It moved to the UFRN University Campus, in Lagoa Nova, a modern building, with new equipment, two studios, and which today also houses the University FM and the UFRN Communication Agency (Agecom). With a reduced team of employees, due to the lack of competitions to fill the roles, it began to rely on the collaboration of students from the UFRN Communication course and on constitution partnerships for the production of programs. The broadcaster started new programming, joining the network and affiliated in 1995 with TV Cultura and some TVE Brasil programs. From 1:30 in the morning it also broadcast SescTV (later TV Senac and STV) until 2004.

In 2004, it left TV Cultura and began showing programs from TVE Brasil and SESC TV.

On December 2, 2007, SESC TV left and the defunct TVE Brasil gave way to TV Brasil, joining as a charter affiliate. In blank slots of the network's satellite programming, local programs began to be included, such as Grandes Temas and TVU Notícias. At the beginning of 2007, TVU also had its signal coverage expanded, with the inauguration of its new 10 kW transmitter, installed on the Nova Descoberta hill.

On January 11, 2024, it expanded the coverage and quality of its digital signal with the installation of a new 1 kW transmitter, in addition to also acquiring a reserve transmitter with a power of 330 watts, with the intention of guaranteeing the continuity of its programming in cases of technical problems.

== Technical information ==
Virtual channel	Digital channel	Aspect ratio	Content
5.1	48 UHF	1080i	Main TVU RN programming/TV Brasil

The station started its digital transmissions on the afternoon of May 15, 2015, through physical channel 48. The digital signal launch ceremony also marked the inauguration of the new facilities of the UFRN Social Communication Department, where several authorities and politicians from the state were present.

Based on the federal decree transitioning Brazilian TV stations from analog to digital signals, TVU RN, as well as the other stations in Natal, ceased broadcasting on VHF channel 5 on May 30, 2018, following the official ANATEL schedule.
