= Rasheek Rifaat =

Rasheek Rifaat is an electrical engineer at Jacobs Canada Inc. in Calgary, Alberta. He was named a Fellow of the Institute of Electrical and Electronics Engineers (IEEE) in 2015 for his contributions to protection of industrial power systems.
