= Chunhua Yang =

Chinese industrial engineer

Chunhua Yang is a Chinese industrial engineer whose research applies deep learning to the control theory and optimization of industrial processes. She is a professor at Central South University in China, the former dean of the university's School of Automation, and director of the Key Laboratory of Industrial Intelligence and Systems of the Chinese Ministry of Education.

== Education and career ==
Yang was a student at Central South University, where she received a bachelor's degree in automation in 1981, a master's degree in control science and engineering in 1985, and a Ph.D. in the same subject in 1999.

She became a professor in the School of Information Science and Engineering at Central South University in 1999. She served as dean of the School of Automation from 2019 to 2023, and became director of the Key Laboratory of Industrial Intelligence and Systems in 2023.

== Recognition ==
Yang is a Fellow of the Chinese Association of Automation. She was elected as an IEEE Fellow in 2022, "for contributions in intelligent control and optimization of complex industrial processes".
