= May Wang =

Chinese-American biomedical engineer

- Education: Georgia Tech; Tsinghua University
- Scientific career
- Fields: Biomedical data science
- Workplaces: Georgia Tech
- Thesis: Video Coding and Transmission for Multimedia Communications Using a 3-D Graphics Model
- Doctoral advisor: Russell M. Mersereau
- Website: https://research.gatech.edu/people/may-dongmei-wang

May Dongmei Wang is a Chinese-American biomedical engineer whose research involves biomedical big data analytics, the interpretation and application of big data in medicine and biology, as generated from microarrays and quantum dots. She is a professor of biomedical engineering and Wallace H. Coulter Distinguished Faculty Fellow in the Wallace H. Coulter Department of Biomedical Engineering, a joint program of Georgia Tech, Emory University, and Peking University.

== Education and career ==
Wang has a bachelor's degree from Tsinghua University. She went to Georgia Tech for graduate study, earning three master's degrees in electrical engineering, applied mathematics, and computer science in 1991, 1993, and 1995 respectively, and completing a Ph.D. in electrical and computer engineering in 2000. Her doctoral dissertation, Video Coding and Transmission for Multimedia Communications Using a 3-D Graphics Model, was supervised by Russell M. Mersereau.

She returned to Georgia Tech as a faculty member, solving a two-body problem with her husband, who was hired at the same time by Emory University. She was named as a Wallace H. Coulter Distinguished Faculty Fellow in 2021.

She is chair of the Association for Computing Machinery special interest group in bioinformatics, computational biology, and biomedical informatics, SIGBio.

== Recognition ==
The American Institute for Medical and Biological Engineering listed Wang in their College of Fellows, in the class of 2015, "for outstanding contributions in biomedical and health informatics for personalized and predictive health and for providing technical leadership". She was named to the International Academy of Medical and Biological Engineering in 2020. Wang was named as an IEEE Fellow, in the 2022 class of fellows, "for contributions to biomedical informatics and AI".
