= International Journal of Computational Intelligence and Applications =

- Discipline: Computer Science
- Language: English

Publication details
- Publisher: Imperial College Press

Standard abbreviations
- ISO 4: Int. J. Comput. Intell. Appl.

Indexing
- ISSN: 1469-0268 (print); 1757-5885 (web)

Links
- Journal homepage

The International Journal of Computational Intelligence and Applications is a refereed scientific journal published by Imperial College Press since 2001. It covers the theory and applications of computational intelligence and aims to provide "a vehicle whereby ideas using two or more conventional and computational intelligence based techniques could be discussed", such as neuro-fuzzy or evolutionary-symbolic combinations.

== Abstracting and indexing ==
The journal is abstracted and indexed in CompuScience and Inspec.
