= Jonathan How =

Canadian-American astrophysicist and aeronautical engineer

Jonathan P. How is a Canadian-American astrophysicist and aeronautical engineer currently the Richard Cockburn Maclaurin Professor at Massachusetts Institute of Technology. His current research focuses on technology systems engineering and space engineering.

How was born in England in 1965. He earned a bachelor's degree in engineering from the University of Toronto before attending the Massachusetts Institute of Technology, where he earned a master's degree and Ph.D. in aerospace engineering. After getting his doctorate, he became an assistant professor at Stanford University. He returned to MIT as a professor in 2000.

How is director of the Ford-MIT Alliance. He was editor-in-chief of IEEE Control Systems Magazine and one of the associate editors for Journal of Aerospace Information Systems of AIAA. He was a member of the Scientific Advisory Board (SAB) for the United States Air Force.

== Awards ==
From 1994 to 1997, How was the Davis Faculty Scholar in the School of Engineering at Stanford University.

How, along with coauthors Dr. Chan-Woo Park and Dr. Larry Capots, received the Institute of Navigation Burka Award for their paper “Sensing Technologies for Formation-Flying Spacecraft in LEO Using CDGPS and an Interspacecraft Communications System” in 2002.

Further, How has won the AIAA Best Paper in Conference Award in 2011, 2012, and 2013. In 2011, he earned the IFAC Automatica award for best applications paper. In 2015, How won the AeroLion Technologies Outstanding Paper Award for the Journal Unmanned Systems.

In 2016, How was named a Fellow of the American Institute of Aeronautics and Astronautics; two years later he became a Fellow of the Institute of Electrical and Electronics Engineers (IEEE). In 2021, How was elected a member of the National Academy of Engineering for contributions to decision making and control of intelligent autonomous aerospace vehicles.
