= Federal University of Rio Grande do Norte =

Public university in Natal, Brazil

Coordinates: 5.83977°S 35.2012°W

- Universidade Federal do Rio Grande do Norte
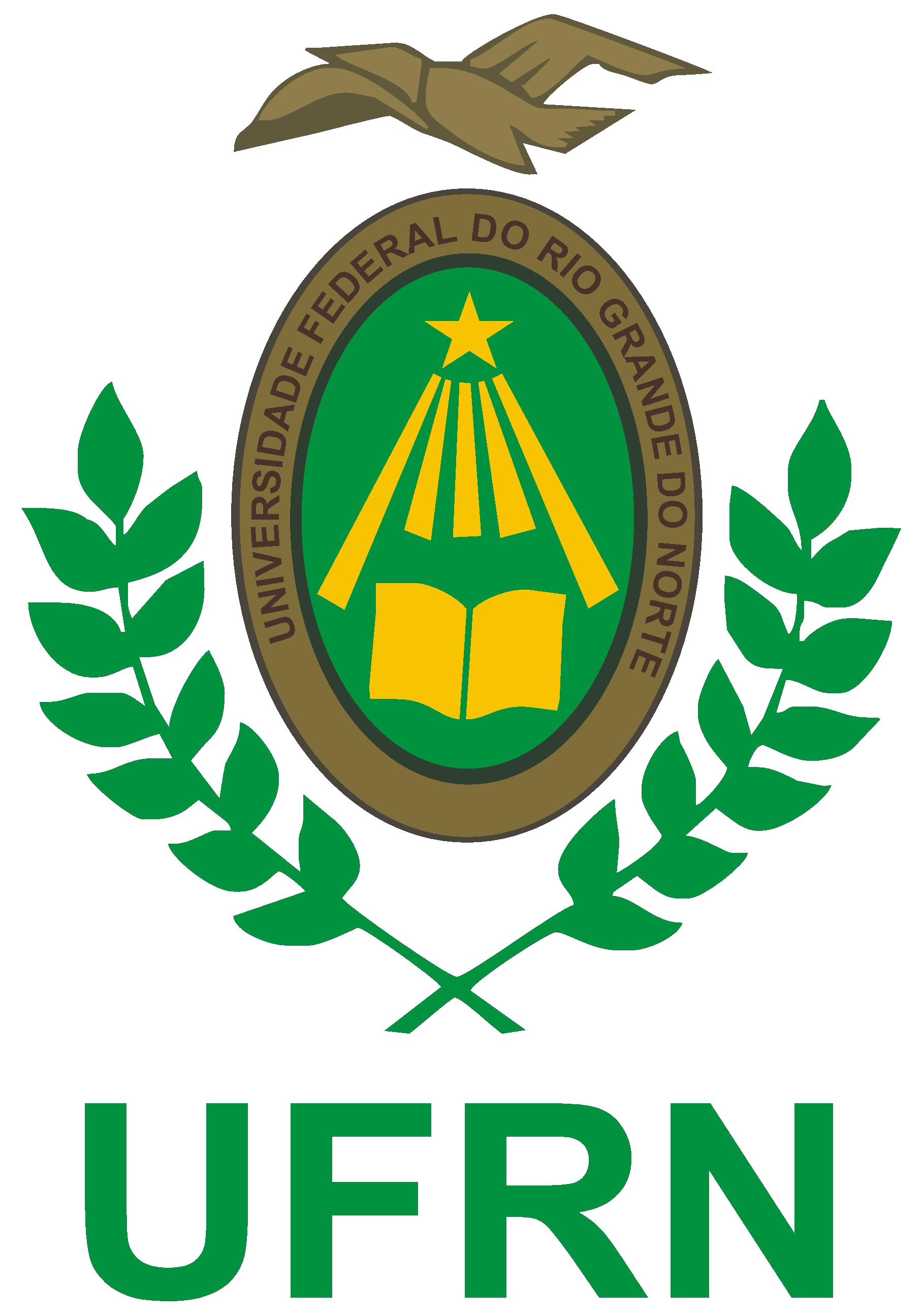
- Coat of Arms
- Other name: UFRN
- Motto: Accipit ut Det
- Motto in English: Receive to Give
- Type: Public
- Established: 1958
- Budget: R$ 1,026,271,882.45 (2012)
- Chancellor: José Daniel Diniz Melo
- Vice-Chancellor: Henio Ferreira de Miranda
- Administrative staff: 1638
- Undergraduates: 30,799
- Postgraduates: 10,039
- Location: Natal, Rio Grande do Norte, Brazil
- Campus: Natal, Macaíba, Santa Cruz, Caicó, Currais Novos
- Website: www.ufrn.br

The Federal University of Rio Grande do Norte (Portuguese: Universidade Federal do Rio Grande do Norte, UFRN) is a public Brazilian university funded by the Brazilian federal government, located in the city of Natal, Rio Grande do Norte, Brazil.

Formally established on December 18, 1960, it includes 60 departments providing over 70 different undergraduate courses, as well as a number of graduate programs.

UFRN is the top ranked university in the state of Rio Grande do Norte, the best university in the North and Northeast region and one of the best universities in the country according to 2012 league tables.

== History ==
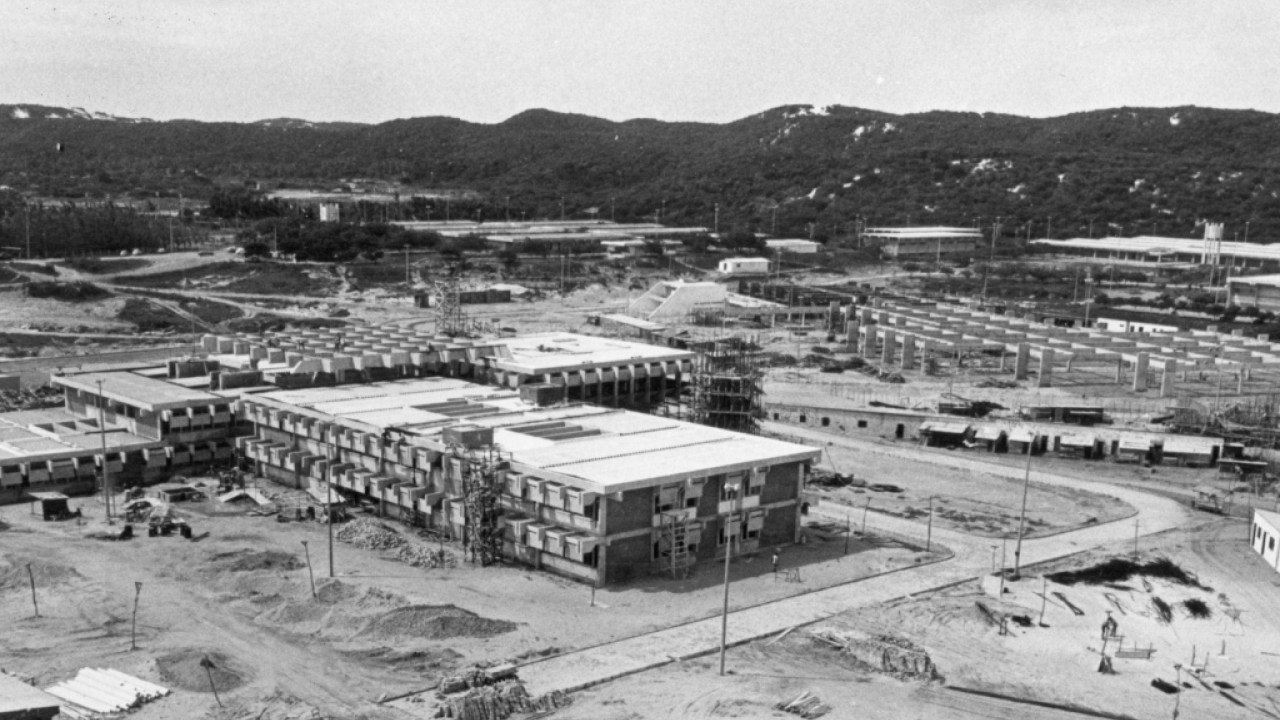
Central Campus in Natal under construction

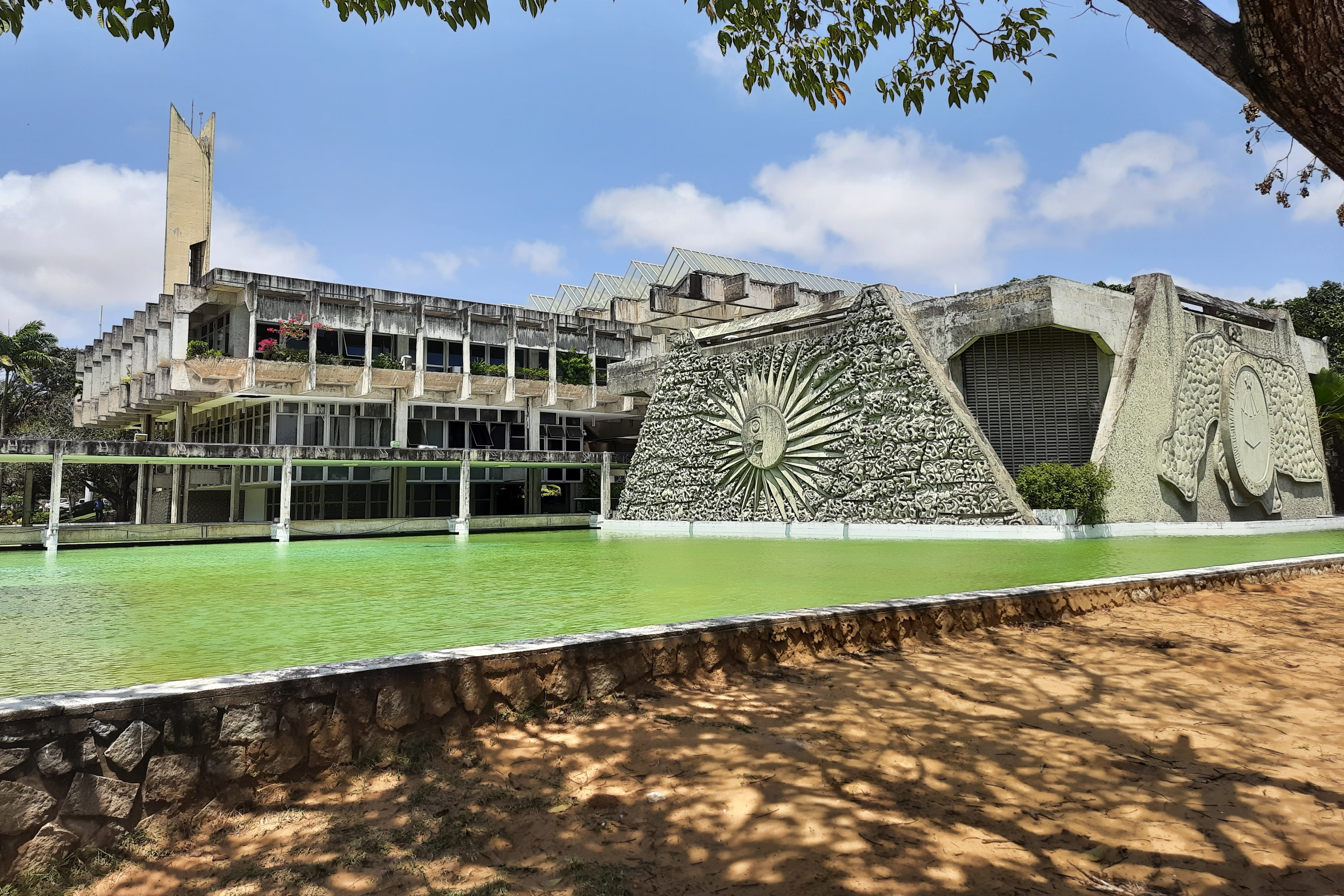
The "Reitoria", Main administrative building in the Natal Campus, with brutalist and modernist characteristics.

The Federal University of Rio Grande do Norte originates from the University of Rio Grande do Norte, created on June 25, 1958, through state law, and federalized on December 18, 1960. The University of Rio Grande do Norte, installed in a solemn session held at Teatro Alberto Maranhão, on March 21, 1959, it was formed from colleges and schools of higher education already existing in Natal, such as the College of Pharmacy and Dentistry; the College of Law; the College of Medicine; the College of Engineering, among others.

From 1968, with the university reform, UFRN went through a reorganization process that marked the end of the faculties and the consolidation of the current structure, that is, the grouping of several departments that, depending on the nature of the courses and disciplines, organized in Academic Centers.

In the 1970s, the construction of the Central Campus began, in an area of 123 hectares. The campus currently houses a bold architectural complex, surrounded by a ring road that integrates it with the urban fabric of the city of Natal.

The UFRN structure was modified, again, by means of a 1974 Decree (N ° 74,211), constituting, also, from then on, the University Council (CONSUNI), the Teaching, Research and Extension Council (CONSEPE), Board of Trustees (CONCURA) and Rectory.

A reform of the UFRN Statute, completed in 1996, established the structure in force today at the university, adding to the existing councils the Board of Directors (CONSAD) and creating, in the academic structure, the Specialized Academic Units and the Interdisciplinary Studies Centers. In addition to the various classes, laboratories and libraries, the Central Campus has a Community Center with a restaurant, bank branches, bookstores, art gallery and post office. The Rector's Office, the Pro-Rectories and all sectors of the Central Administration function in the Rectory building.

UFRN's major events usually take place in Praça Cívica, designed in the form of a large open-air amphitheater, where great shows also take place. For sports events and practices, the campus has a multi-sport park, with an Olympic gymnasium, soccer field, athletics track and Olympic pools.

Currently, UFRN offers, between undergraduate and graduate courses, more than 200 training opportunities. Its academic community is made up of more than 43,000 students and around 5,500 civil servants, including technical-administrative and permanent teachers, in addition to substitute and visiting professors.

== CERES ==
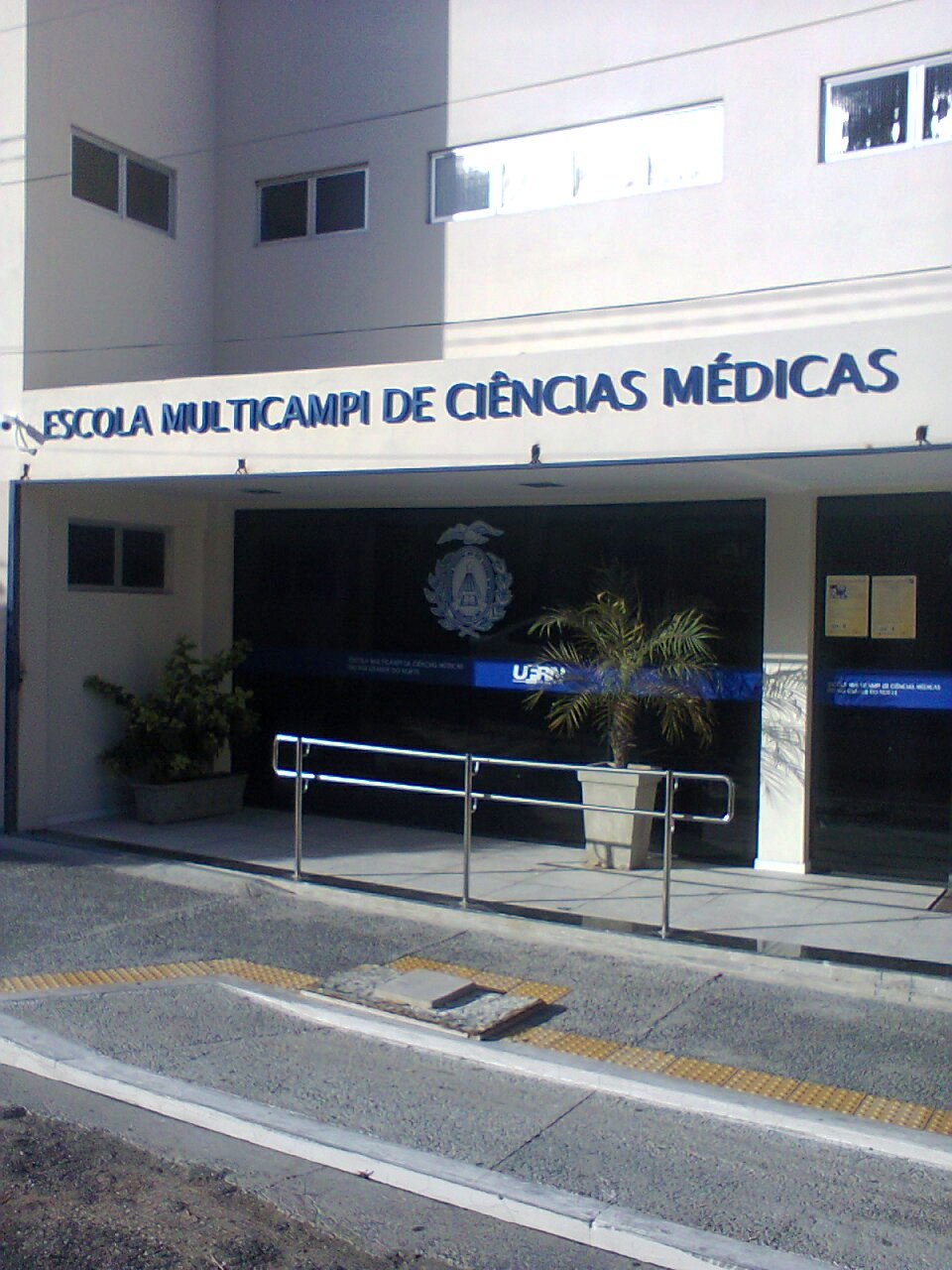
EMCM entrance in the Caicó campus

The Seridó Higher Education Center (CERES) of the Federal University of Rio Grande do Norte is formed by the university campuses of Caicó and Currais Novos. Its academic structure is formed by eight Departments that offer thirteen on-campus undergraduate courses and two master's courses - Professional Masters in Letters - PROFLETRAS and the Professional Master in Geography - GEOPROF.

In Caicó, the academic departments are: Department of Law, Department of Education, Department of History, Department of Geography, Department of Exact and Applied Sciences and the Department of Computing and Technology. In Currais Novos, the Department of Social and Human Sciences and the Department of Letters operate.

The undergraduate courses in the face-to-face modality are: in Caicó, degrees in Geography, History, Mathematics and Pedagogy, and in Currais Novos Letras / Spanish and Letras Português / Literatura. Within the scope of the bachelor's degree, we have 07 courses, of which 05 work in Caicó: Accounting, Law, Geography, History and Information Systems and 02 work in Currais Novos: Administration and Tourism.

CERES also has support centers from the Secretariat of Distance Education (SEDIS) that offer distance learning courses. There are 17 undergraduate courses, of which 08 work in Caicó and 09 work in Currais Novos. Thus, on the campus of Caicó, there are degrees in Biological Sciences, Physical Education, Geography, Literature, Pedagogy and Chemistry, and bachelor's degrees in Administration and Technologist in Public Management. On the campus of Currais Novos, there are degrees in Biological Sciences, Physical Education, Physics, Literature, Mathematics, Pedagogy and Chemistry and bachelor's degrees in Public Administration and Technologist in Public Management.

=== EMCM ===
The Multicampi School of Medical Sciences of Rio Grande do Norte's mission is to promote medical training of excellence, supported by the social commitment to contribute to the innovation of health services and the progressive improvement of the population's quality of life. It is proposed to train doctors inserted in the health network in the countryside of the state, linked to the social reality of the population, capable of combining qualified technical-scientific training with ethical-humanistic attitudes that enable them to work as a team and positively impact the current reality. The course seeks to train suitable professionals to work effectively in the labor market, particularly in the rural context and outside large urban centers, valuing the health needs of our population and their ethical and cultural value.

== School of Agriculture and Technology of Jundiaí ==
The Escola Agrícola de Jundiaí was created by law No. 202 of December 1949, as "Escola Prática de Agricultura", located in the former Fazenda Jundiaí, 3 km from the municipality of Macaíba, and 25 km from the State capital Natal.

The Escola Prática de Agricultura was transformed into "Escola Agrotécnica de Jundiaí", by the agreement signed between the state of Rio Grande do Norte and the Ministry of Agriculture, on April 9, 1954, being subordinate to the Ministry of Agricultural and Veterinary Education of that Ministry .

Pursuant to Decree No. 61,162, of August 16, 1967, it was incorporated into the Federal University of Rio Grande do Norte, later renaming it Colégio Agrícola de Jundiaí - CAJ.

The transfer of the School to the UFRN aimed, among other objectives, at implementing the Agronomy Course on its physical basis, which did not happen.

With Resolution No. 006/2002 - CONSUNI, of August 16, 2002, which approved modifications and alterations to the UFRN General Regulation, the Unit receives the current name of Escola Agrícola de Jundiaí.

On December 19, 2007, through Resolution No. 11/2007 - CONSUNI, the Escola Agrícola de Jundiaí changed from being a Supplementary Organ to a Specialized Academic Unit in Agrarian Sciences, integrated with the academic and administrative structure of UFRN.

It is defined under the terms of Art. 9 of the UFRN Statute, as a unit of teaching, research and extension activities in Agrarian Sciences, and aims at the integration between its various sub-areas of knowledge by improving the teaching provided, which requires structuring bases and groups and research aimed especially at the technological development of agro-food and agro-industrial production chains.

The intention expressed in Art. 2 of the aforementioned Resolution is that the Academic Unit will become, in the medium and long term, a Center of Excellence in Agricultural Sciences, which requires the implementation of new technological training courses at medium levels, undergraduate and graduate courses in the same area of knowledge.

== Edmond and Lily Safra International Institute of Neurosciences ==
Ideated by the neuroscientist Miguel Nicolelis, the Santos Dumont Institute (Instituto Santos Dumont – ISD) seeks inspiration in the iconic and innovative figure of Santos Dumont, the Brazilian father of aviation. The Northeast of Brazil was intentionally chosen for ISD acting to foster human, social and financial development of such region. The Institution considers social responsibility and innovation as motors for all actions of teaching, research and extension developed in areas of Education, Neurosciences, Neuroengineering, Maternal and Child Health as well as in Rehabilitation.

The Brazilian presidential decree of February 27, 2014, qualified ISD as a Social Organization. This unique kind of partnership between the public and private sectors enables the Government to fund a non-profit organization to perform services with public interest. Currently, ISD develops its activities through a management contract signed with the Brazilian Ministry of Education (MEC).

The ISD has established a crucial partnership with the Federal University of Rio Grande do Norte to join efforts in several projects. The institute has also partnership with other institutions in other countries like USA, Scotland, Japan, France, Mexico, Portugal, Sweden and Switzerland. Since 2013 the institute promotes the first Brazilian master's degree in Neuroengineering, The program seeks to train distinguished professionals, who transit between academic and business sectors (public or private), articulating the neurosciences with engineering. This future researcher must be well qualified in scientific, political, ethical and social areas, as well as developing the skill to work in interdisciplinary and multidisciplinary teams.

The structure of the Program was designed to bridge the barriers between undergraduate courses in the exact, biological, and human areas. There is a real need for multidisciplinary training in Brazil, especially in the Northeast region.

The IIN-ELS master's degree course is free of charge, has a duration of 24 months and its concentration field is Biomedical Engineering. The application process is open twice a year.

== Academics ==
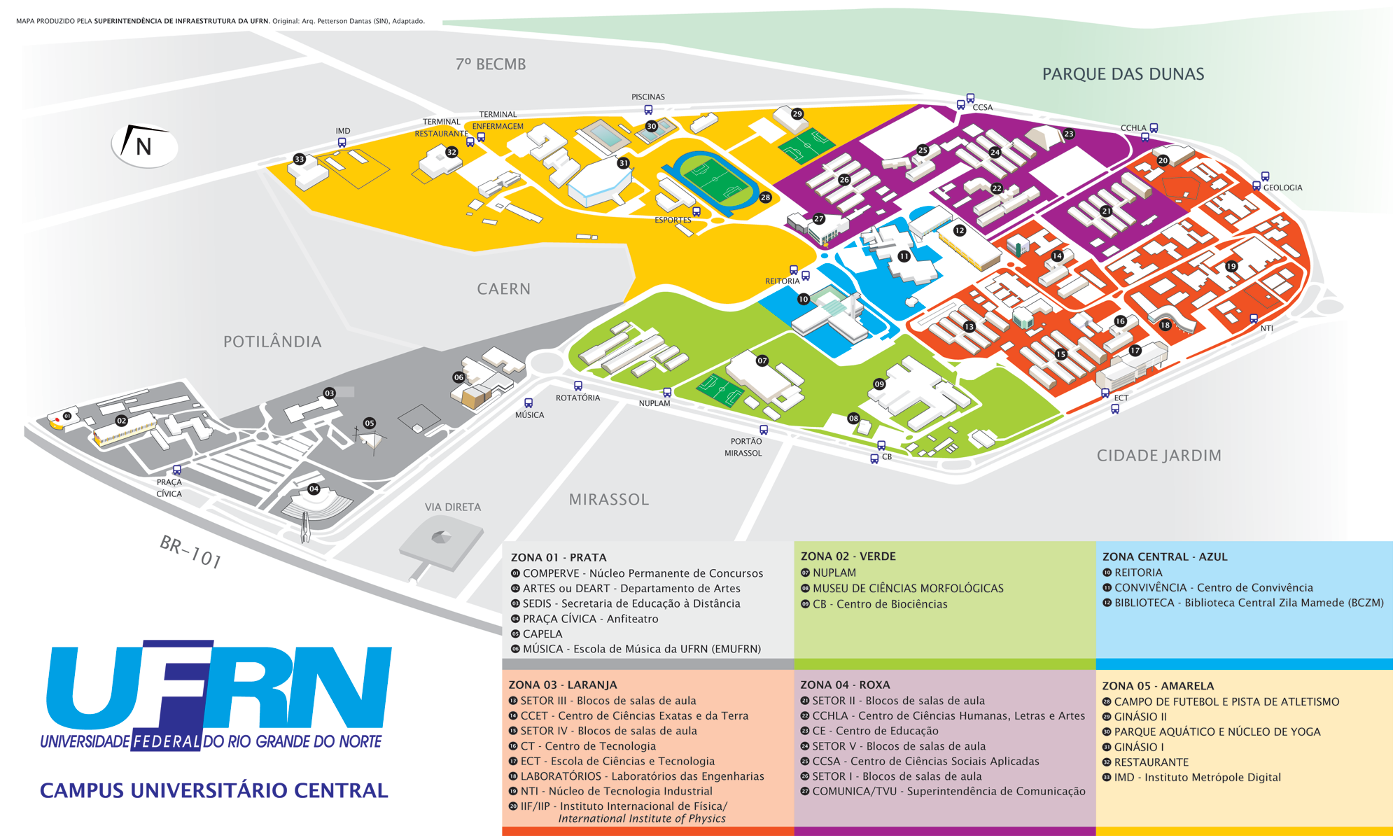
Map of the Natal Campus

In the 1970s, construction began on the Central Campus between the districts of Lagoa Nova, Capim Macio and Nova Descoberta, which houses most of the university's facilities in the capital. In addition to the various classes, auditoriums, laboratories and libraries, Campus Central has a Coexistence Center with restaurant, bank branches, bookstores, art gallery and post office. In the building of the Rectory are the Office of the Rector, the Pro-Rectorates and all sectors of the central administration. It is divided in Bioscience Center (CB), Center of Human Sciences, Letters and Arts (CCHLA), Center of Exact and Earth Sciences (CCET), Center of Applied Social Sciences (CCSA), Center of Education (CE), Center for Health Sciences (CCS), School of Science and Technology (ECT), Faculty of Health Sciences of Trairi (FACISA), Center for Higher Education of Seridó (CERES), the latter located in the municipalities of Caicó and Currais Novos and the Escola Multicampi de Ciencias Médicas (EMCM), based in Caicó.

UFRN Seismological Laborator (LabSis/UFRN) is the main seismology study center in the country. In addition, the university has a postgraduate course in Complex Systems Applied to Life Sciences, the only one in Latin America. The Brazilian Bar Association (OAB) elected the UFRN Law course as the third best in the country, the Federal University of Rio Grande do Norte (UFRN) also received the best evaluation among Higher Education institutions in the North and Northeast regions, according to the General Course Index (IGC). The post was previously occupied by the Federal University of Pernambuco (UFPE).

Recently, the International Institute of Neurosciences Edmond and Lily Safra, IIN-ELS promotes, since 2013, the first Brazilian master's degree Program in Neuroengineering approved by Brazilian Government / CAPES.

=== Rankings ===
University rankings

Global – Overall
- ARWU World: 801-900 (2019)

UFRN is the main seismology study center in the country. In addition, the university has the postgraduate course in Complex Systems Applied to Life Sciences, the only one in Latin America.

In the 2009.3 edition, the Brazilian Bar Association (UAB) elected UFRN Law School (Campus Caicó) as the third best in the country.

The Federal University of Rio Grande do Norte (UFRN) received the best evaluation among the institutions of Higher Education in the North and Northeast regions, by the General Index of Courses (IGC). The post before was occupied by the Federal University of Pernambuco (UFPE).

In the ranking published in February 2013 by Webometrics, UFRN ranked 31st among the 100 universities in Latin America. The list shows the institutions according to their presence and impact on the web, as well as the visibility and quality of the published content.

The Center of Health Sciences, a part of the UFRN, also offers the second best medical degree in the North and Northeast regions of Brazil, according to the Brazilian ranking Rank Universitário Folha(RUF) in 2017.

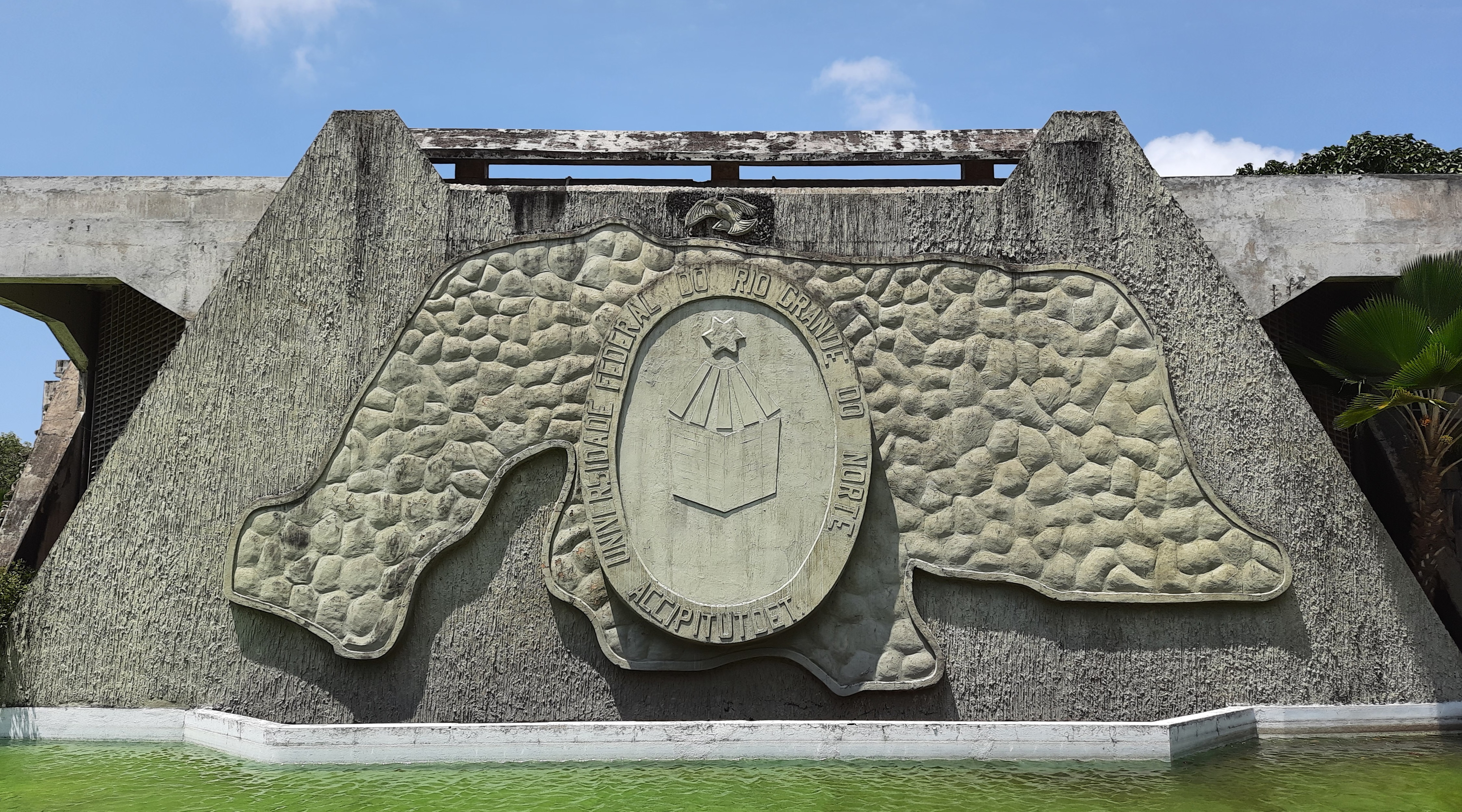
Building of the "Museu de arte Abraham Palatnik"

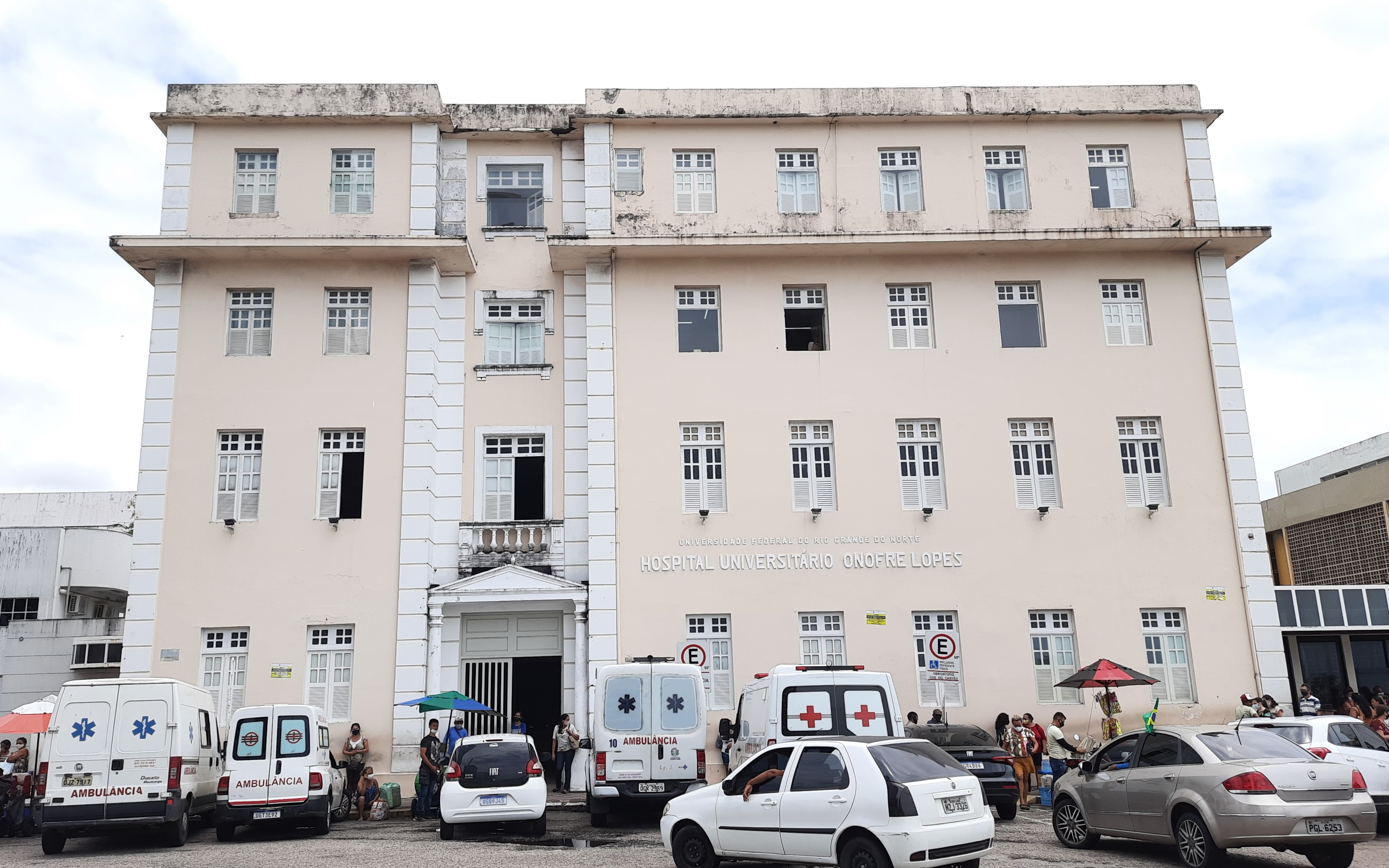
University Hospital Onofre Lopes old entrance

=== Hospitals ===
The UFRN also manages three large university hospitals in the city of Natal where its central campus is located, including the Onofre Lopes University Hospital of the Federal University of Rio Grande do Norte(HUOL-UFRN) which the largest hospital in the state, and where the Laboratory of Technological Innovation in Health (LAIS) is located, the Hospital de Pediatria da UFRN is also managed by the UFRN as well as the Maternity School Januário Cicco - MEJC. In addition the Faculty of Medicine in the university is regarded as one of the best in the country, usually competing for first place in the North and Northeast regions of the country with the Federal University of Pernambuco (UFPE).

=== Museums ===
The university also manages four museums around the State, the "Museu do Seridó", "Museu Câmara Cascudo", "Museu de arte Abraham Palatnik" and the "Museu de Ciências Morfológicas".

== Chancellors List ==
1. Onofre Lopes da Silva (1959 - 1971)
2. Genário Alves da Fonsêca (1971 - 1975)
3. Domingos Gomes de Lima (1975 - 1979)
4. Diógenes da Cunha Lima Filho (1979 - 1983)
5. Genibaldo Barros (1983 a 1987)
6. Daladier Pessoa Cunha Lima (1987 a 1991)
7. Geraldo Queiroz (1991 a 1995)
8. José Ivonildo do Rêgo (1995 - 1999)
9. Otom Anselmo de Oliveira (1999 - 2003)
10. José Ivonildo do Rêgo (2003 - 2007)
11. José Ivonildo do Rêgo (2007 - 2011)
12. Ângela Maria Paiva Cruz (2011 - 2015)
13. Ângela Maria Paiva Cruz (2015 - 2019)
14. José Daniel Diniz Melo (2019 - 2023)

== Gallery ==
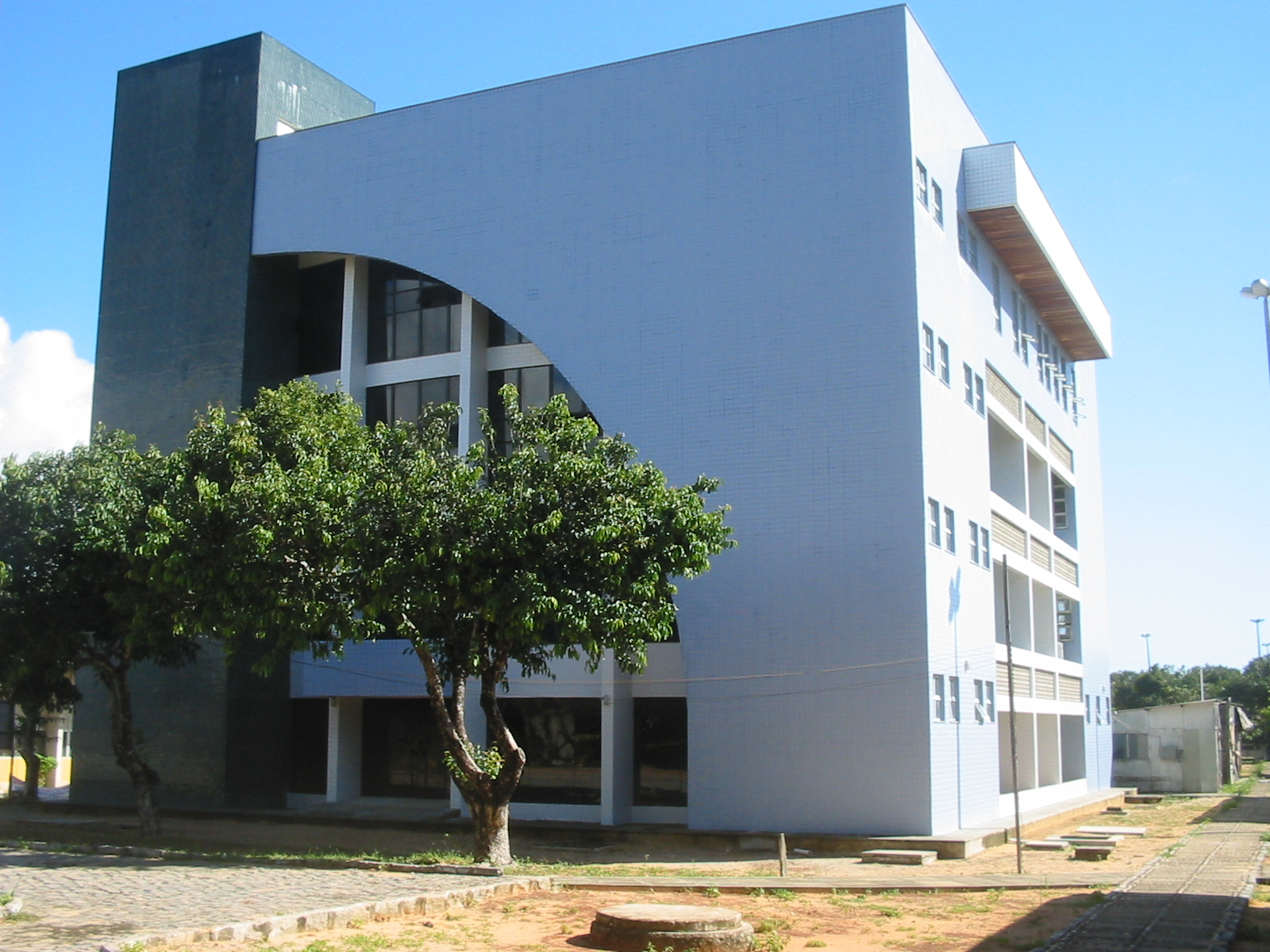
Lacep At the Natal Campus

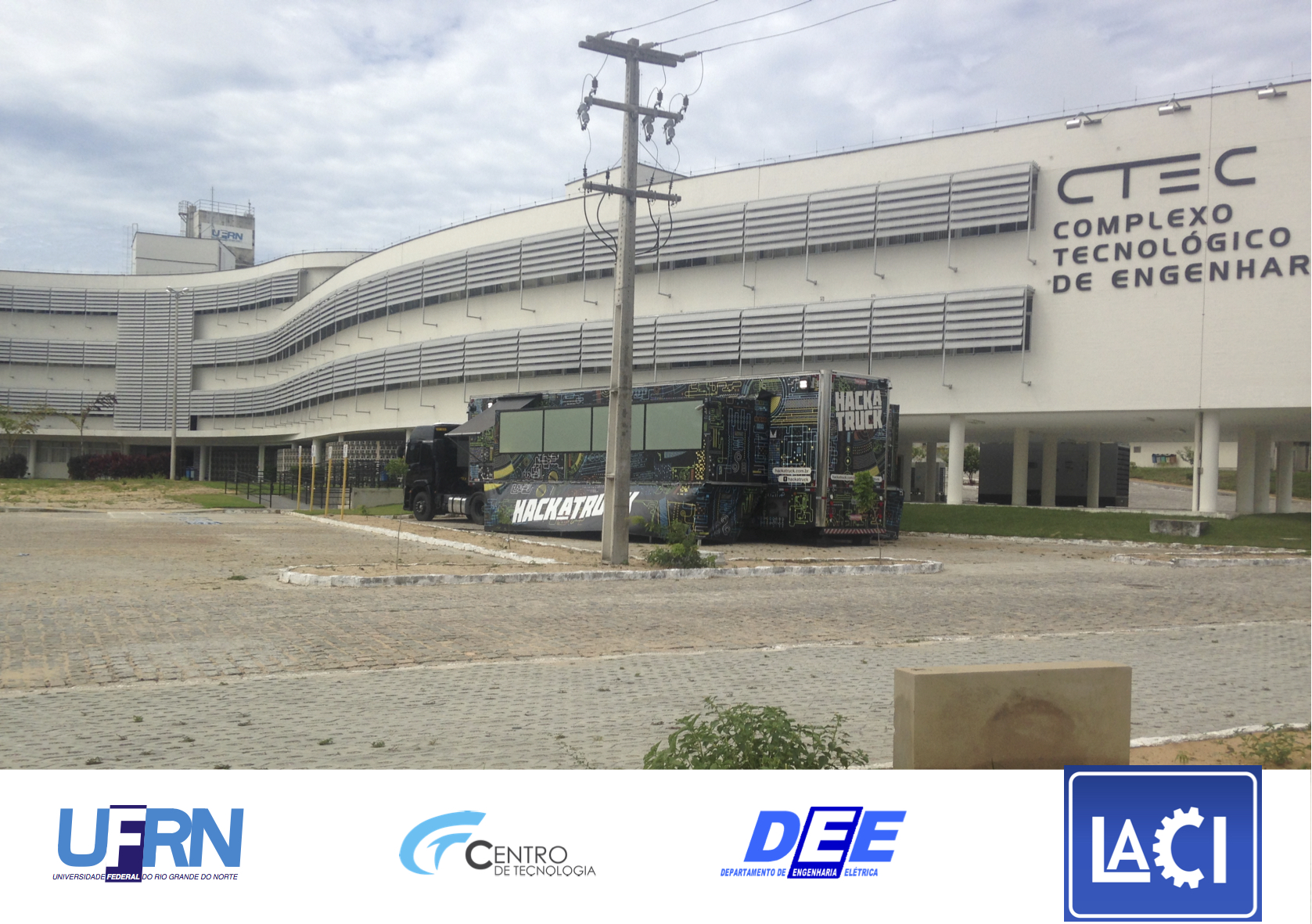
CTEC at the Natal Campus

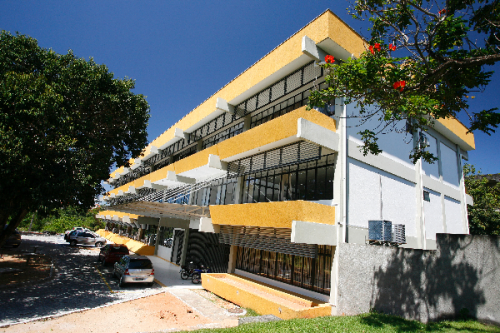
Biological Science Center at the Natal Campus

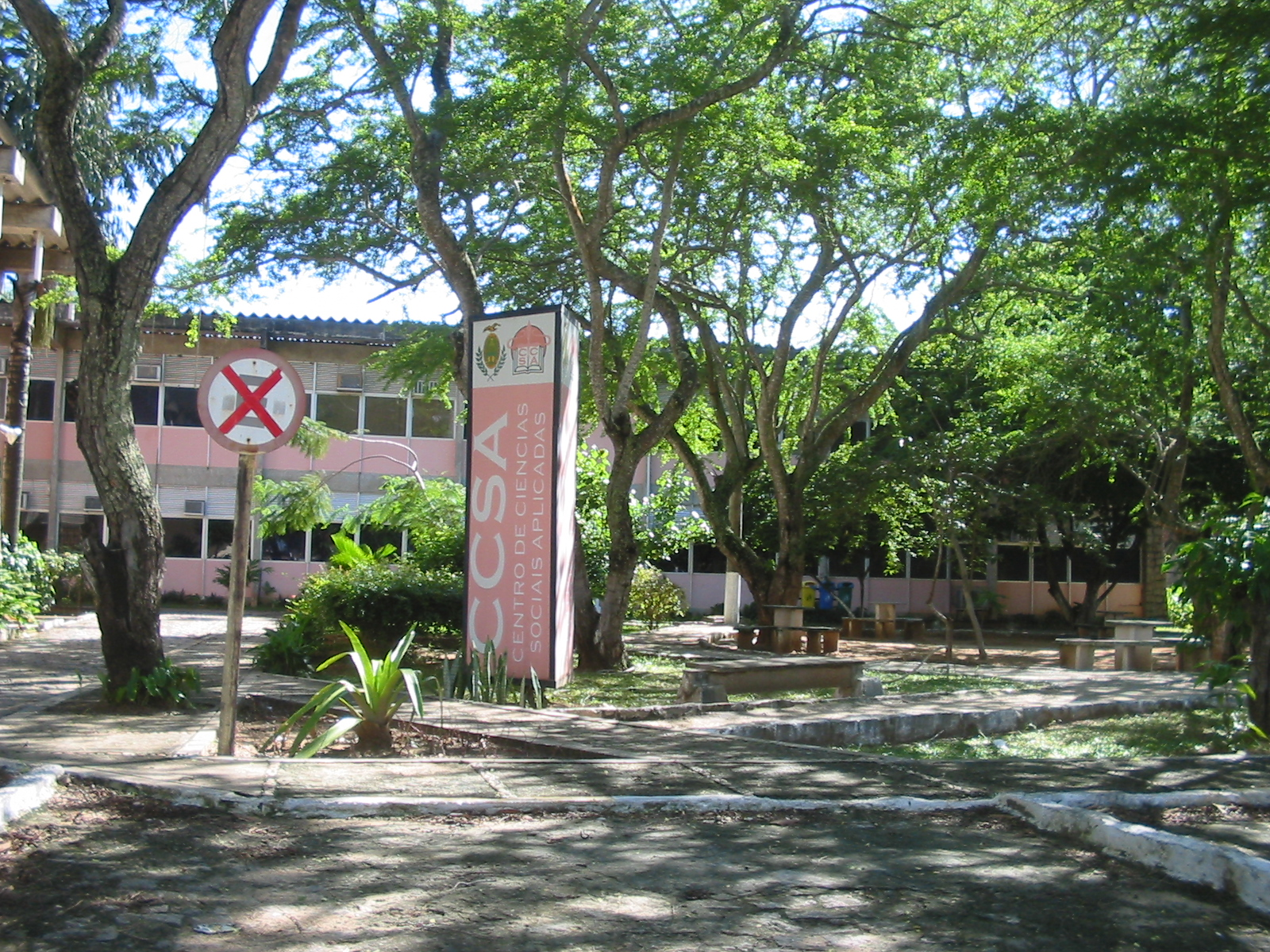
Applied Social Sciences Center at the Natal Campus

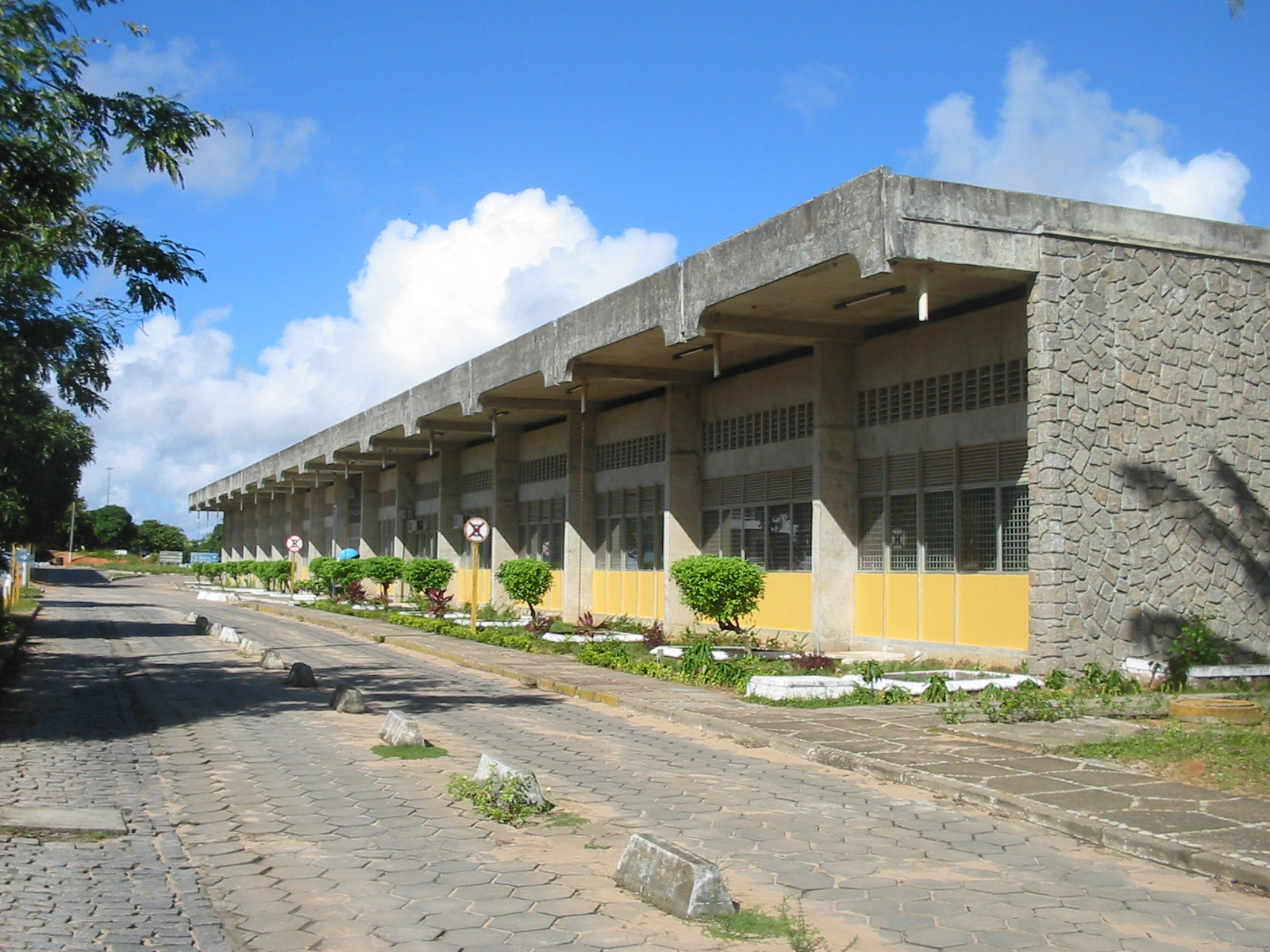
Central Library Zila Mamede at the Natal Campus

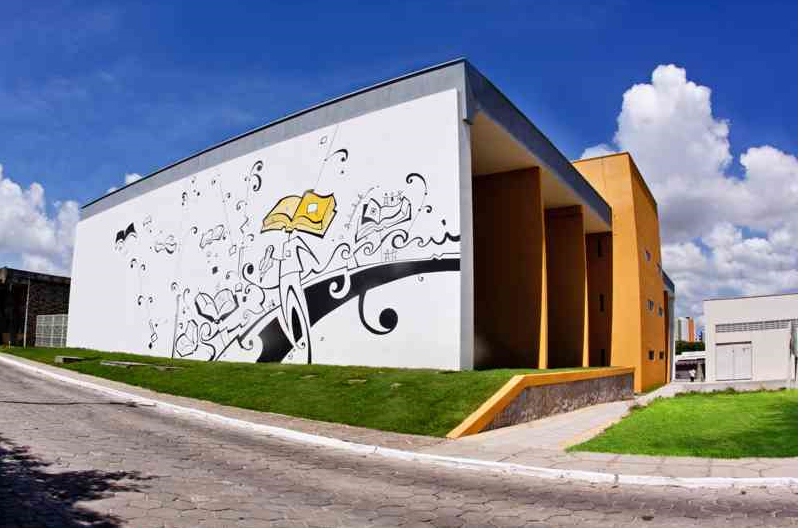
Central Library Zila Mamede at the Natal Campus

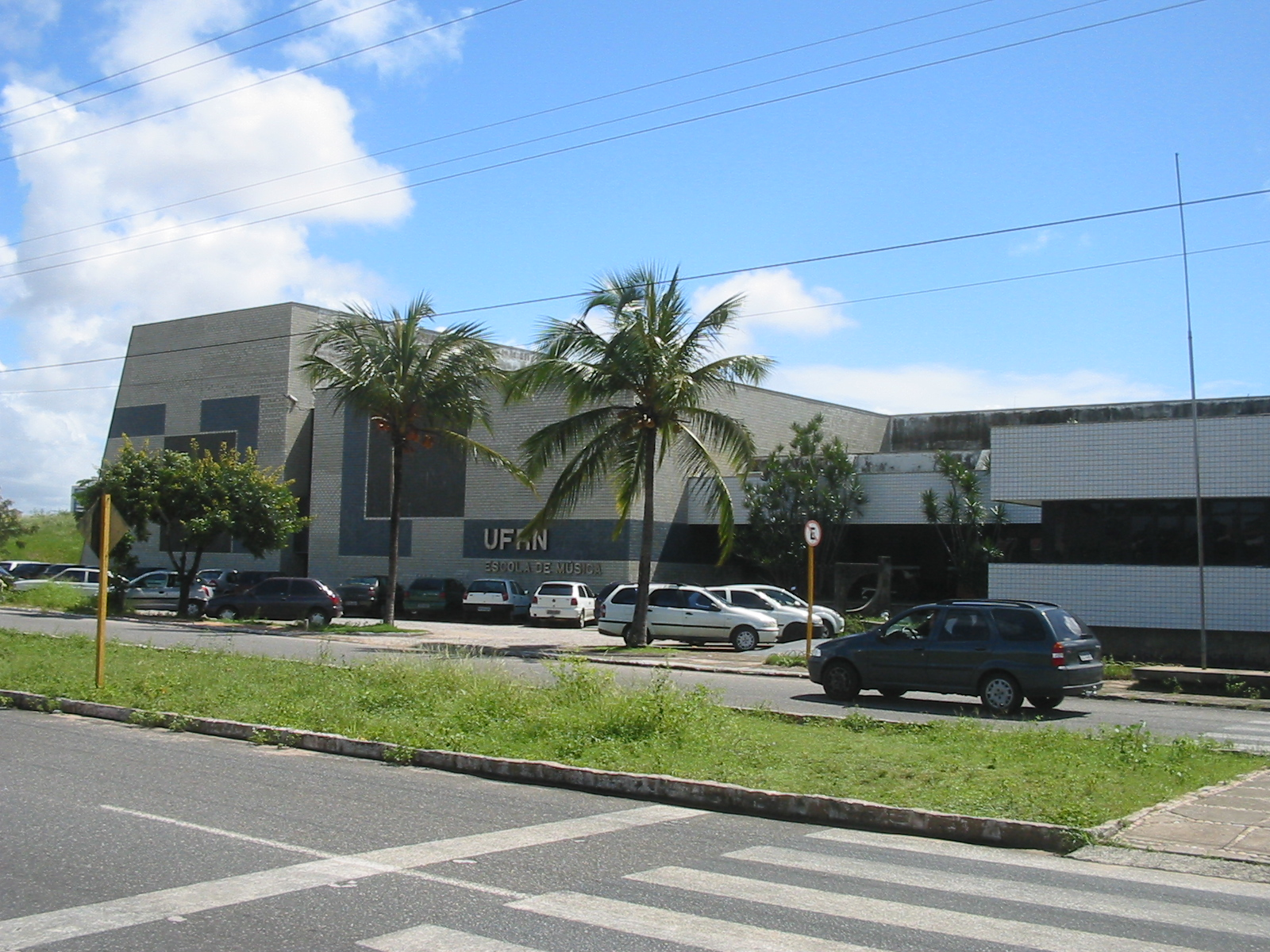
Music School at the Natal Campus

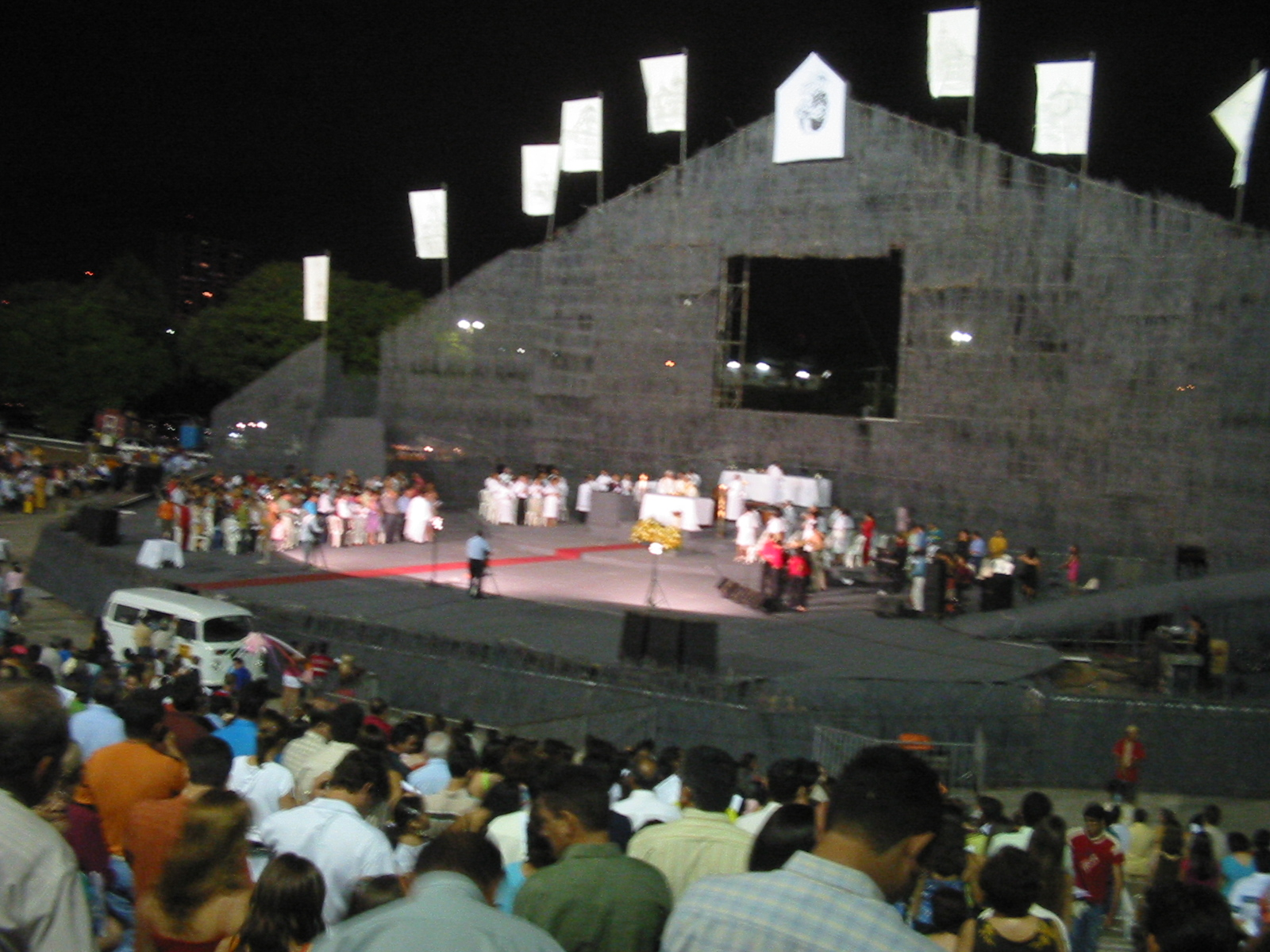
UFRN Chapel

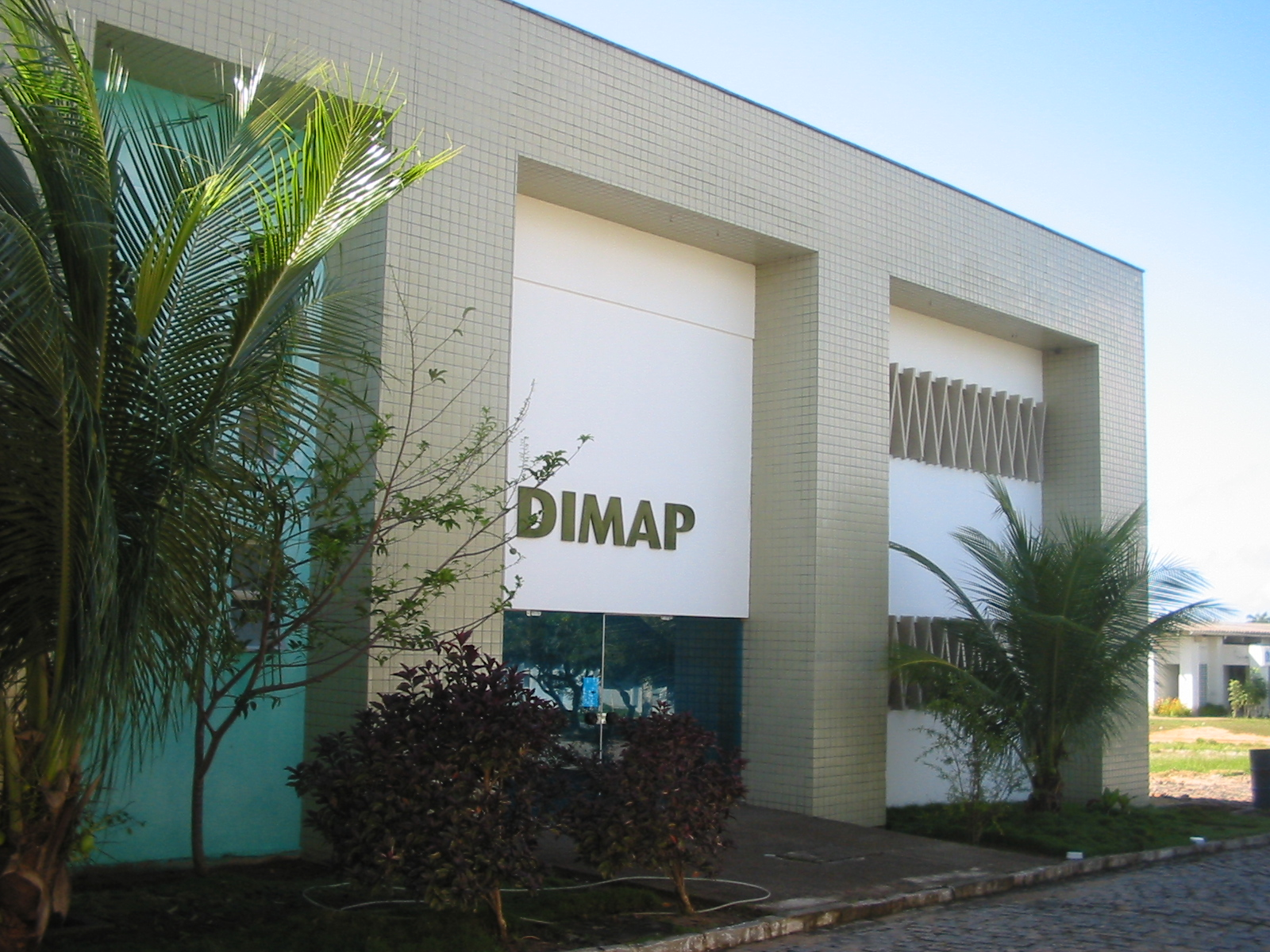
DIMAP at the Natal Campus

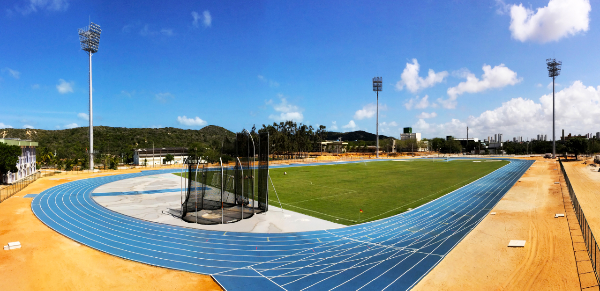
A Soccer Field at the Natal Campus

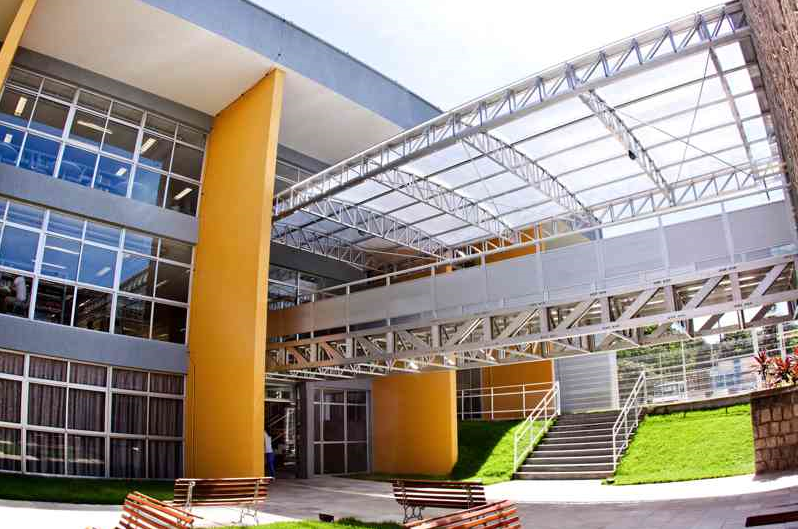
New Annex of the Central Library Zila Mamede at the Natal Campus

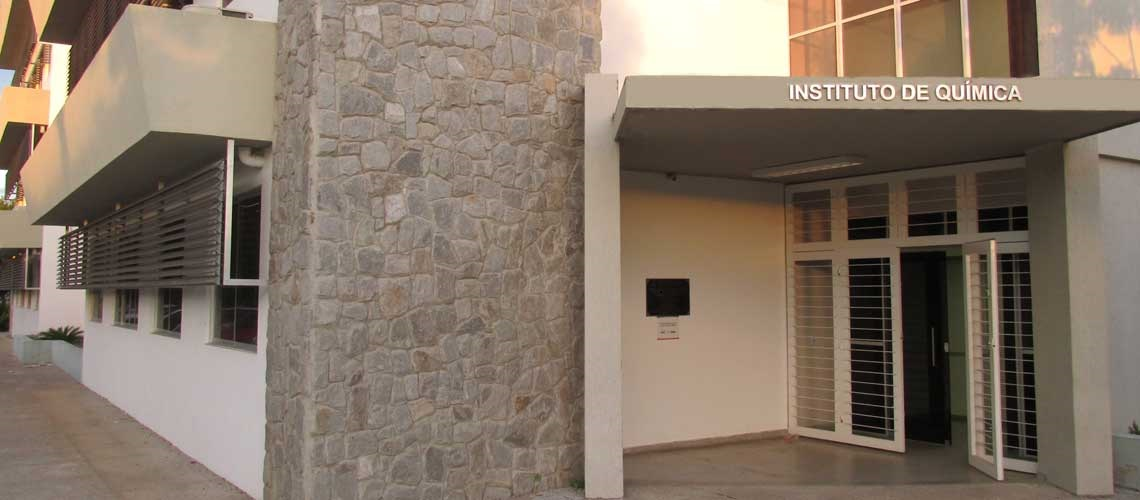
Chemistry Institute III at the Natal Campus

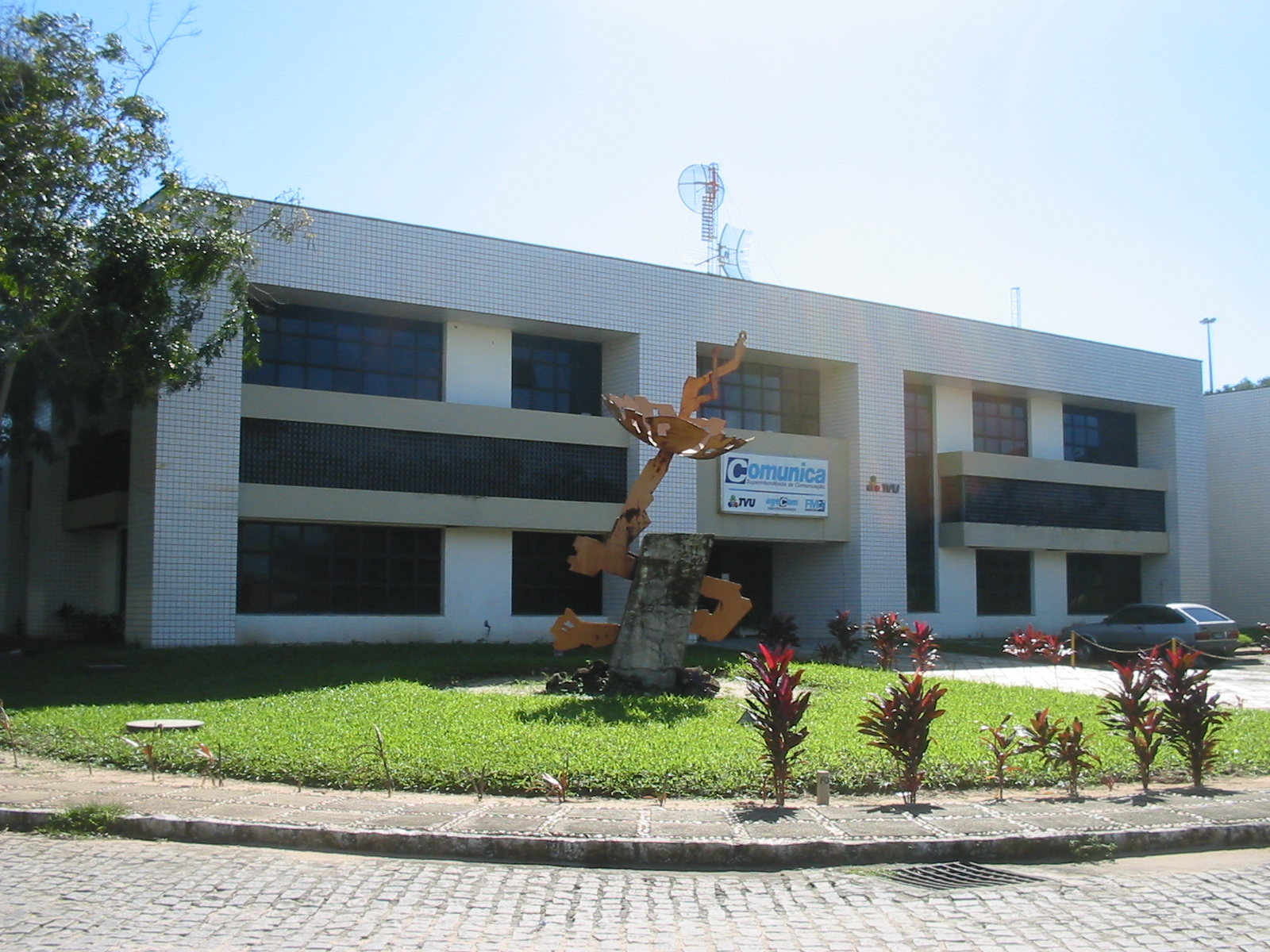
University TV building at the Natal Campus

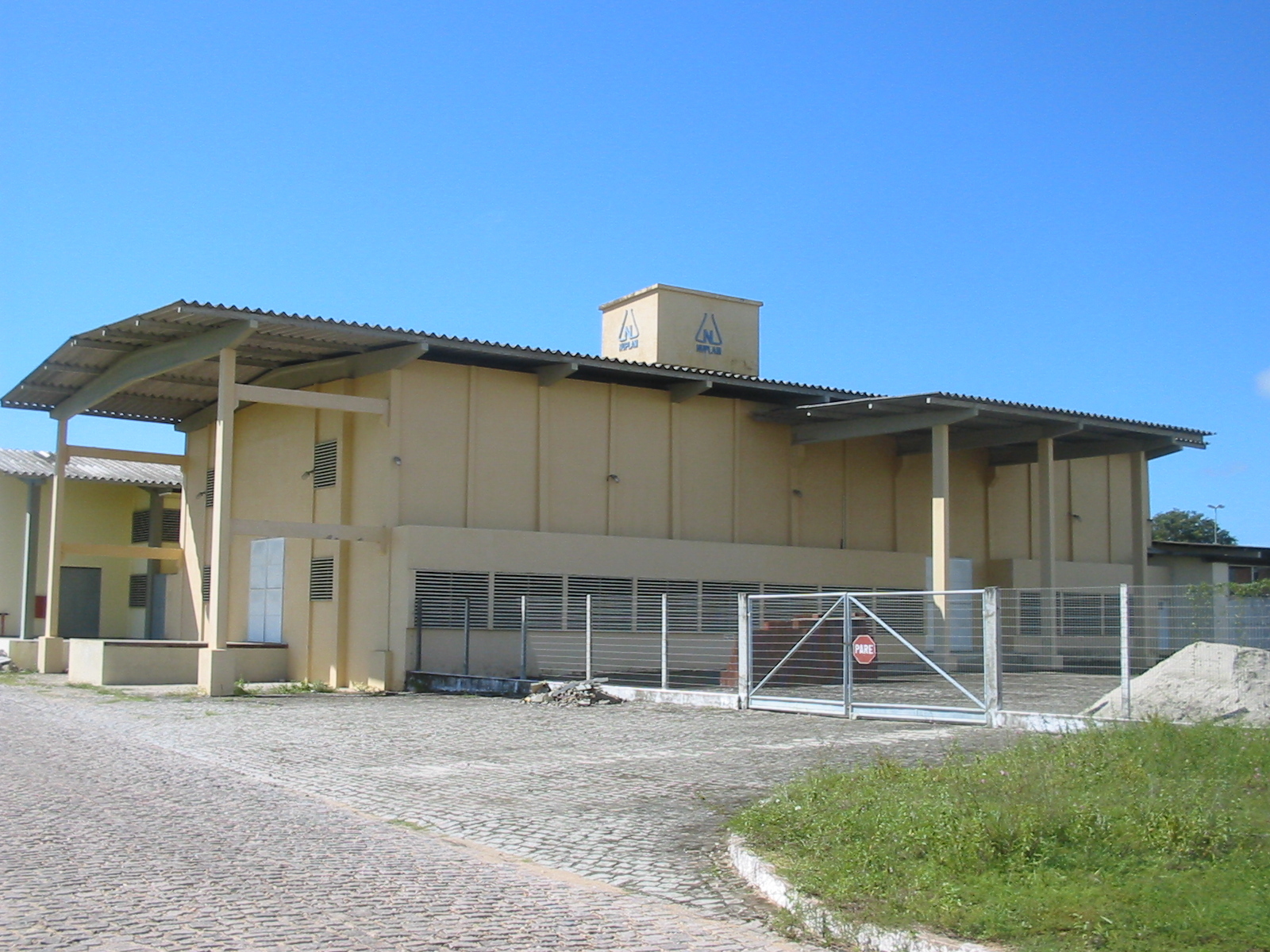
Nuplam At the Natal Campus

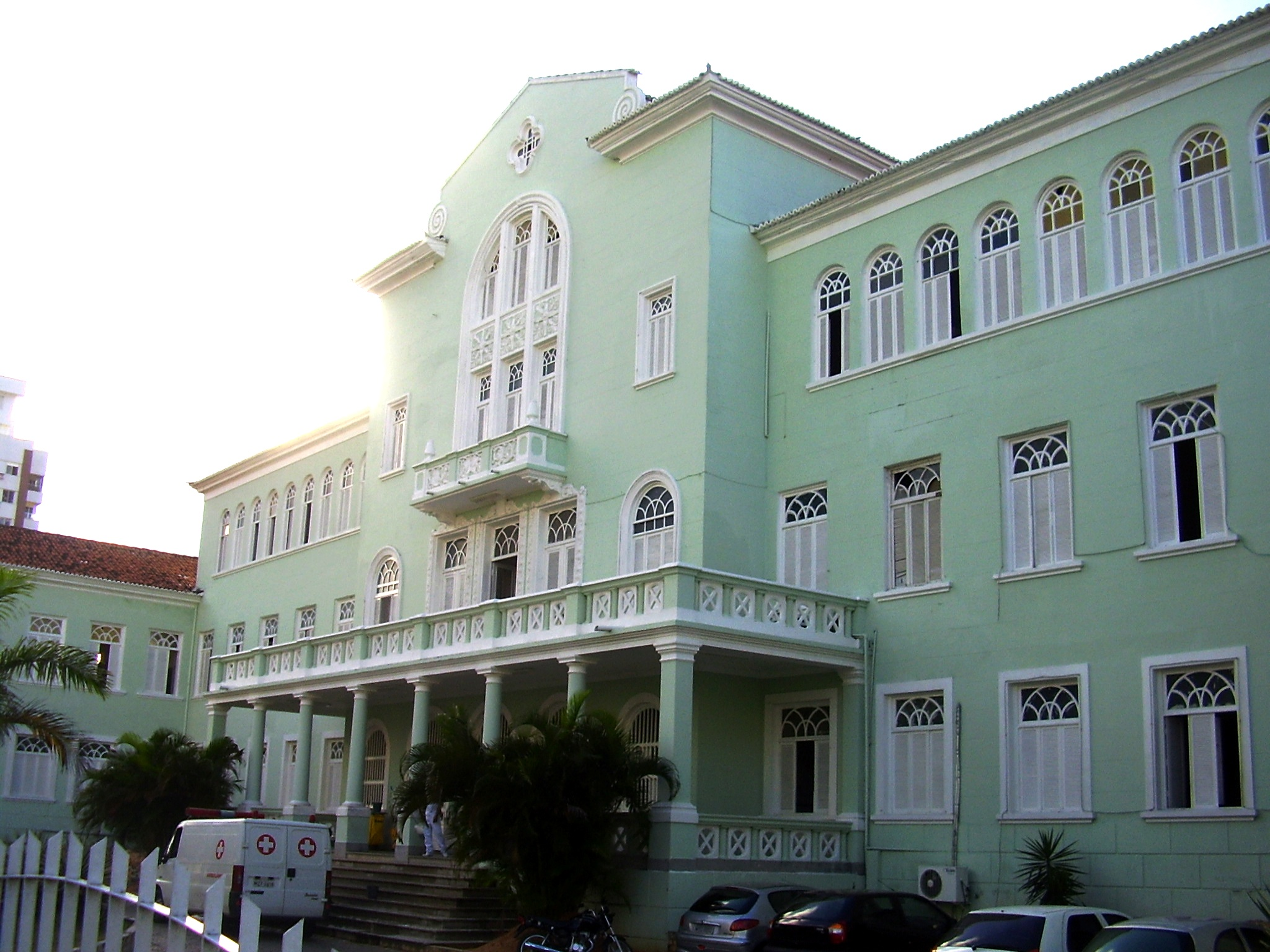
Hospital Januário Cicco, is a UFRN hospital

== See also ==
- Brazil University Rankings
- List of federal universities of Brazil
- TV Universitária Rio Grande do Norte
- Universities and Higher Education in Brazil
