= Zhijun Zhang =

Chinese engineer and professor

Zhijun Zhang (Chinese: 张志军; born November 1971) is a Chinese engineer and professor from Tsinghua University, Beijing, China was named Fellow of the Institute of Electrical and Electronics Engineers (IEEE) in 2015 for contributions to antenna design and propagation modeling in mobile communication devices.
