= P. N. Suganthan =

Sri Lankan academic

- Education: Union College, Tellippalai; University of Cambridge
- Awards: IEEE Fellow
- Scientific career
- Fields: Computer science
- Institutions: University of Sydney; University of Queensland; Qatar University
- Doctoral students: Jing Liang

Ponnuthurai Nagaratnam Suganthan is a computer science academic from KINDI Center for Computing Research, Qatar University. He was named Fellow of the Institute of Electrical and Electronics Engineers (IEEE) in 2015 for "contributions to optimization using evolutionary and swarm algorithms".

Suganthan's main research contributions are in the areas of evolutionary algorithms, swarm intelligence, deep learning, big data, and pattern recognition.

Suganthan studied at Union College, Tellippalai, Jaffna, Sri Lanka, from primary school until year 12. He scored the highest aggregate of 372 in the 1986 GCE Advanced Level in Sri Lanka and received a full scholarship to the University of Cambridge.

After completing his PhD research in 1995, he served as a research assistant in the Department of Electrical Engineering at the University of Sydney in 1995–96 and a lecturer in the Department of Computer Science and Electrical Engineering, University of Queensland in 1996–99. He moved to Qatar University in 2022.

Suganthan is a founding co-editor-in-chief of Swarm and Evolutionary Computation. He is a member of the editorial board of Evolutionary Computation (MIT Press), and an associate editor of IEEE Transactions on Cybernetics, IEEE Transactions on Evolutionary Computation, Information Sciences (Elsevier), Pattern Recognition (Elsevier) and International Journal of Swarm Intelligence Research. He was selected as a highly cited researcher by Thomson Reuters from 2015 to 2023 in computer science (the World's Most Influential Scientists, 2015).
