= Michel Verleysen =

Michel Verleysen from the University of Louvain (UCLouvain) in Louvain-la-Neuve, Belgium was named Fellow of the Institute of Electrical and Electronics Engineers (IEEE) in 2015 for contributions to high-dimensional analysis and manifold learning.
