= Anthony N. Michel =

American engineering educator (1935–2020)

Anthony N. Michel (November 17, 1935 – February 1, 2020), a life fellow of the Institute of Electrical and Electronics Engineers, was an American engineering educator. His expertise was in qualitative analysis of dynamical systems with emphasis on stability theory and applications.

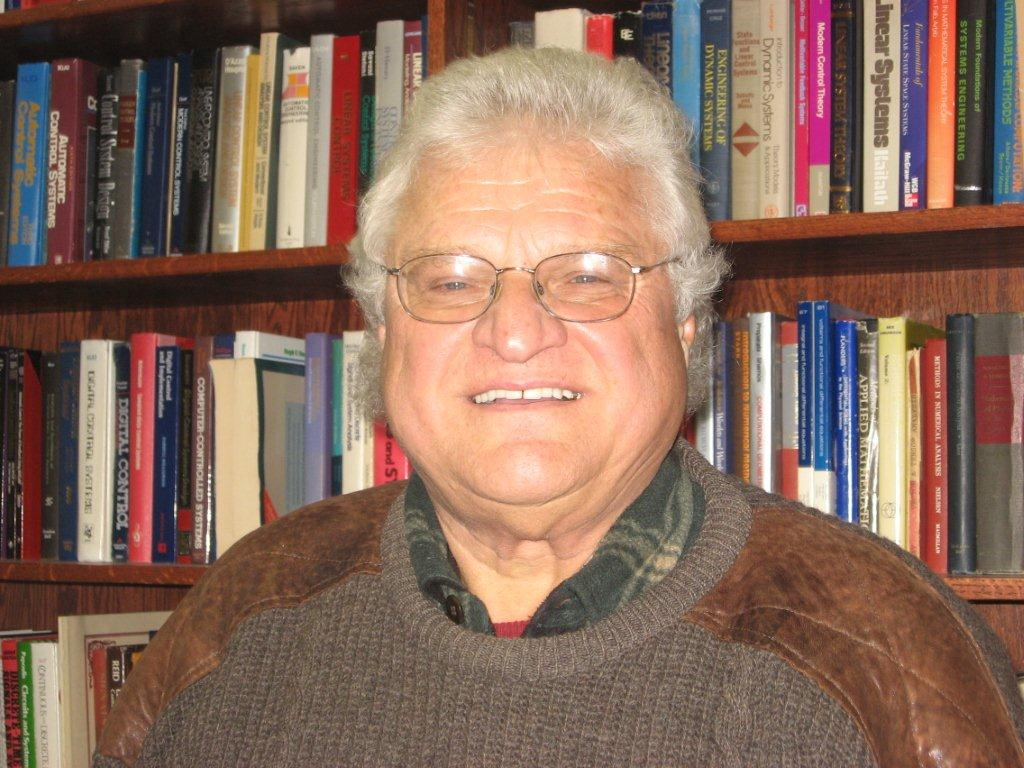
Anthony N. Michel, 2012

== Career ==
Anthony N. Michel grew up in Romania as a member of the Banat Swabian ethnic minority. Prior to emigrating to the United States in 1952, he lived for five years in a displaced persons camp in Austria.

After receiving a bachelor's degree in electrical engineering in 1958 from Marquette University in Milwaukee, Wisconsin, he spent seven years in the aerospace industry. In 1964, he received a master's degree in mathematics and in 1968 a PhD in electrical engineering from Marquette. In 1973 he received a DSc in applied mathematics from the Technical University of Graz, Austria.

Prior to becoming a member of the faculty of the University of Notre Dame in 1984, he was for sixteen years a professor of electrical engineering at Iowa State University, Ames, Iowa. He joined the faculty at Notre Dame as chair of the Department of Electrical Engineering and from 1988 until 1998 he was the dean of the College of Engineering at Notre Dame. He has held visiting professorships at the Ruhr University Bochum, Germany, the Vienna University of Technology, Austria, and the Johannes Kepler University of Linz, Austria.

His publications include twelve text books and monographs. Several of his students are distinguished academics and scholars.

Anthony N. Michel retired from the University of Notre Dame in 2003 as the Matthew H. McCloskey Dean Emeritus of the College of Engineering and the Frank M. Freimann Professor Emeritus at the University of Notre Dame. He died Saturday, February 1, 2020 at the age of 84.

== Awards and recognition ==
For his contributions as a researcher and educator he was elected a fellow of the Institute of Electrical and Electronics Engineers, he was named Frank M. Freimann Chaired Professor of Engineering at the University of Notre Dame, he was appointed Matthew H. McCloskey Dean of Engineering at the University of Notre Dame, he was appointed editor-in-chief of the IEEE Transactions on Circuits and Systems (1981–1983), and he served as the president of the IEEE Circuits and Systems Society in 1989. He was elected a Foreign Member of the Russian Academy of Engineering (formerly the Engineering Academy of the USSR) in 1992.

He was a Fulbright scholar in Austria in 1992 and he was awarded Germany's Alexander von Humboldt Research Award in 1998. He received the George S. Axelby Outstanding Paper Award of the IEEE Control Systems Society in 1978, the Guillemin-Cauer Best Paper Award of the IEEE Circuits and Systems Society in 1984, and the Charles A. Desoer Technical Achievement Award of the IEEE Circuits and Systems Society in 1995. He received the IEEE Centennial Medal in 1984, the Golden Jubilee Medal of the IEEE Circuits and Systems Society in 1999, and the IEEE Third Millennium Medal in 2000.
