= Dipankar Dasgupta =

Dipankar Dasgupta is a computer science professor at the University of Memphis, Tennessee. Dasgupta was named a Fellow of the Institute of Electrical and Electronics Engineers (IEEE) in 2015 for his contributions to immunological computation and bio-inspired cyber security.
