= Jagath Chandana Rajapakse =

Jagath Chandana Rajapakse is Professor of Data Science at the College of Computing and Data Science, the Nanyang Technological University, Singapore. He holds BSc degree in Electronics and Telecommunication Engineering from University of Moratuwa (UM), Sri Lanka, and MS and PhD degrees in Electrical and Computer Engineering from University at Buffalo (UB), USA. He was Visiting Scientist to the Max-Planck Institute of Cognitive and Brain Sciences, Germany, and the National Institute of Mental Health, USA before joining NTU. He was Visiting Professor to the Department of Biological Engineering at Massachusetts Institute of Technology (MIT).

Professor Rajapakse has published over 300 peer-reviewed research articles in high-impact journals and conferences, which are listed here. His current research interests are in explainable AI, generative AI, brain imaging, and drug discovery. He focuses on developing computational techniques and tools for diagnosis and treatment of brain diseases with neuroimaging scans (MRI, fMRI, DTI, and PET) and omics data (genomics, proteomics, transcriptomics, and epigenomics); and he also investigates how generative AI can be used to discover novel drugs (small molecules, peptides, and antibodies) for targeted therapeutics.

He serves as Editor for Engineering Applications in Artificial Intelligence journal (IF = 8.0) and served as Associate Editor for IEEE Transactions on medical imaging, IEEE Transaction on neural networks and learning systems, and IEEE Transactions on computational biology and bioinformatics. He was a Fulbright Scholar and elevated to IEEE Fellow in 2012 in recognition of his contributions to brain image analysis.

was named Fellow of the Institute of Electrical and Electronics Engineers (IEEE) in 2012 for contributions to computational techniques for magnetic resonance imaging.
