= Houbing Song =

Computer Scientist

Houbing Herbert Song is an American computer scientist and professor whose research focuses on trustworthy artificial intelligence (AI), cyber-physical systems, Internet of Things (IoT), and cybersecurity. He is a tenured Full Professor in the Department of Information Systems at the University of Maryland, Baltimore County in Baltimore, USA, where he directs the Security and Optimization for Networked Globe (SONG) Laboratory.

Song received his Ph.D. degree in electrical engineering from the University of Virginia in August 2012.

Song was named a Fellow of the Institute of Electrical and Electronics Engineers (IEEE) in November 2022 for contributions to big data analytics and integration of AI with Internet of Things. In November 2022 he was named an Association for Computing Machinery (ACM) Distinguished Member for Outstanding Scientific Contributions to Computing.

Since 2021, Song has been a Highly Cited Researcher identified by Clarivate/Web of Science. Song's research has been cited over 45,000 times and Song has an h-index of 105.

Song has held numerous editorial leadership positions in the computing and engineering communities. In 2025, he became Co-Editor-in-Chief of IEEE Transactions on Industrial Informatics, one of the leading journals in industrial AI and intelligent automation. He also serves as Area Editor for IEEE Internet of Things Journal and Associate Editor for several ACM and IEEE journals.

In 2024, Song founded the Trustworthy Internet of Things (TRUST-IoT) Working Group within IEEE IoT Technical Community. In 2025, Song founded the ACM Emerging Interest Group on Trustworthy and Responsible Systems (EIGTRUST), an ACM technical community dedicated to advancing research and education in trustworthy and responsible computing. Under his leadership, the organization launched a new conference ACM International Conference on Trustworthy and Responsible AI and Computing Systems.

== Awards and honors ==
- Fellow of the Institute of Electrical and Electronics Engineers (IEEE)
- Highly Cited Researcher in the field of Computer Science - 2023
- Highly Cited Researcher in the field of Computer Science - 2022
- Highly Cited Researcher in the field of Cross-Field - 2021
- Distinguished Member of the Association for Computing Machinery (ACM)
- Fellow of the Asia-Pacific Artificial Intelligence Association (AAIA)
- Fellow of the International Artificial Intelligence Industry Alliance (AIIA)
- 2025 AI 2000 Most Influential Scholar Award Honorable Mention in Internet of Things
- 2024 AI 2000 Most Influential Scholar Award Honorable Mention in Internet of Things
- 2023 AI 2000 Most Influential Scholar Award Honorable Mention in Internet of Things
- 2022 Research.com Rising Star of Science, Research.com
- 2021 Harry Rowe Mimno Award, IEEE Aerospace and Electronic Systems Society
- Distinguished Speaker of the Association for Computing Machinery (ACM)
- IEEE Computer Society Distinguished Visitor
- IEEE Communications Society (ComSoc) Distinguished Lecturer
- IEEE Intelligent Transportation Systems Society (ITSS) Distinguished Lecturer
- IEEE Systems Council (SYSC) Distinguished Lecturer
- IEEE Vehicular Technology Society (VTS) Distinguished Lecturer

== Books ==
- Tiny Machine Learning: Design Principles and Applications, ISBN 978-1394302376, 2026, Wiley-IEEE Press
- Neuro-symbolic AI: Foundations and Applications, ISBN 9781394294541, 2026, Wiley-IEEE Press
- AI for Cybersecurity: Research and Practice, ISBN 978-1394293742, 2026, Wiley-IEEE Press
- Applied Graph Data Science: Graph Algorithms and Platforms, Knowledge Graphs, Neural Networks, and Applied Use Cases, ISBN 9780443296543, 2024, Elsevier
- Quantum Machine Learning: Quantum Algorithms and Neural Networks, ISBN 9783111342276, 2024, De Gruyter
- Federated Learning for Digital Healthcare Systems, ISBN 9780443138973, 2024, Elsevier
- Access Control and Security Monitoring of Multimedia Information Processing and Transmission, ISBN 978-1-83953-693-9, 2023, IET Press
- Aviation Cybersecurity: Foundations, principles, and applications, ISBN 978-1839533211, 2022, IET Press
- Smart Transportation: AI Enabled Mobility and Autonomous Driving, ISBN 978-0367352967, 2021, CRC Press
- Big Data Analytics for Cyber-Physical Systems, ISBN 9780128166376, 2019, Elsevier
- Security and Privacy in Cyber-Physical Systems: Foundations and Applications, ISBN 978-1-119-22604-8, 2017, Wiley-IEEE Press
- Smart Cities: Foundations, Principles and Applications, ISBN 978-1119226390, 2017, Wiley
- Secure and Trustworthy Transportation Cyber-Physical Systems, ISBN 978-981-10-3891-4, 2017, Springer
- Cyber-Physical Systems: Foundations, Principles and Applications, ISBN 978-0-12-803801-7, 2016, Elsevier
- Industrial Internet of Things: Cybermanufacturing Systems, ISBN 978-3-319-42558-0, 2016, Springer

== Patents ==
- UAS Detection and Negation- US20210197967A1
- UAS Detection and Negation- WO2020236328A3

== Publications ==
- A Decade Survey of Transfer Learning (2010–2020)- IEEE Transactions on Artificial Intelligence
- A Survey on Symbolic Knowledge Distillation of Large Language Models- IEEE Transactions on Artificial Intelligence
- Neurosymbolic Reinforcement Learning and Planning: A Survey- IEEE Transactions on Artificial Intelligence
- A Survey on Verification and Validation, Testing and Evaluations of Neurosymbolic Artificial Intelligence- IEEE Transactions on Artificial Intelligence
- Counter-Unmanned Aircraft System(s) (C-UAS): State of the Art, Challenges, and Future Trends- IEEE Aerospace and Electronic Systems Magazine
- Machine Learning for the Detection and Identification of Internet of Things Devices: A Survey- IEEE Internet of Things Journal
- Security of the Internet of Things: Vulnerabilities, Attacks, and Countermeasures- IEEE Communications Surveys & Tutorials
- Differential Privacy for Industrial Internet of Things: Opportunities, Applications, and Challenges- IEEE Internet of Things Journal
