= George Lindaris =

George Lendaris, an Emeritus Professor of Systems Science and Electrical and Computer Engineering at Portland State University, was named a Fellow of the Institute of Electrical and Electronics Engineers (IEEE) in 1983 for developing and implementing sampled optical diffraction patterns for image analysis.

He was an early proponent of neural network research in the 1960s through the 1990s, then transitioned work to a systems scientific approach to modeling energy policy for climate change.

He published 92 papers with over 27,000 reads and more than 2,000 citations. He is also a Fellow of the International Neural Network Society.

The International Neural Network Society has a complete biography and video interview. He received his Ph.D. from the University of California, Berkeley. His research interests focus on Computational Intelligence and Fuzzy Logic.
