= Thomas Stuetzle =

Belgian engineer

Thomas Stuetzle from the Universite Libre de Bruxelles (ULB), Brussels, Belgium was named Fellow of the Institute of Electrical and Electronics Engineers (IEEE) in 2016 for contributions to the design and engineering of heuristic optimization algorithms.
