= Stefanos Kollias =

Stefanos Kollias from the National Technical University of Athens, Greece was named Fellow of the Institute of Electrical and Electronics Engineers (IEEE) in 2015 for contributions to intelligent systems for multimedia content analysis and human machine interaction.
