= Hisao Ishibuchi =

Hisao Ishibuchi from the Osaka Prefecture University, Osaka, Japan, was named Fellow of the Institute of Electrical and Electronics Engineers (IEEE) in 2014 for contributions to evolutionary multiobjective optimization and fuzzy rule-based classifier design.
