= Hao Ying =

American professor (born 1958)

Hao Ying (应浩; born 1958) is a professor of electrical and computer engineering at Wayne State University in Detroit, Michigan. He was named a Fellow of the Institute of Electrical and Electronics Engineers (IEEE) in 2012 for his contributions to the theory and biomedical applications of fuzzy control.

== Works ==
- Ying, Hao (2000). Fuzzy control and modeling: analytical foundations and applications. New York: IEEE Press. OCLC 925724843.
