= Annamária Várkonyi-Kóczy =

Hungarian electrical engineer

Annamária R. Várkonyi-Kóczy (born 1957) is a Hungarian electrical engineer specializing in the application of machine learning and image processing methods to environmental and industrial problems. She is a professor in the Institute of Mechatronics and Vehicle Engineering at Óbuda University.

== Education and career ==
Várkonyi-Kóczy was born in 1957 in Budapest, and studied electrical engineering at the Technical University of Budapest, earning master's degrees in 1981 and 1983 and a Ph.D. in 1996. She added a D.Sc. (the Hungarian equivalent of a habilitation) through the Hungarian Academy of Sciences in 2010.

After ten years as a researcher in the Hungarian Research Institute for Telecommunication and Hungarian Academy of Sciences, she returned to the Technical University of Budapest, as a faculty member in the Department of Measurement and Information Systems, in 1991. In 2009 she moved to her present position as a full professor in the Institute of Mechatronics and Vehicle Engineering at Óbuda University.

== Recognition ==
Várkonyi-Kóczy was named as an IEEE Fellow in 2007, "for contributions to digital signal processing in measurement and control". She is also a member of the Hungarian Academy of Engineering (Magyar Mérnökakadémia, MMA).
