= Bayya Yegnanarayana =

Scientist

Bayya Yegnanarayana is an INSA Senior Scientist at Indian Institute of Technology (IIT) Hyderabad, Telangana, India. He is an eminent professor and is widely regarded as the father of speech processing in India with his contributions in Digital Signal Processing, Speech Signal Processing, Artificial Neural Networks and related areas. He has guided about 39 PhD theses, 43 MS theses and 65 MTech projects. He was the General Chair for the international conference, INTERSPEECH 2018, held at Hyderabad. He also holds the positions as Distinguished Professor, IIT Hyderabad and an Adjunct Faculty, IIT Tirupati.

== Early life ==
Yegnanarayana was born on January 9, 1944, in Rajahmundry, Andhra Pradesh, India. He obtained his Bachelor of Science degree from Andhra University, Waltair, in 1961. Then Bachelor of Engineering in 1964, Master's degree in 1966, and PhD in 1974, from Indian Institute of Science, Bangalore.

== Awards/Honours received ==
1. Honorary Fellow of AP Akademi of Sciences, 2016
2. Fellow of International Speech Communication Association (ISCA), 2014
3. INSA The Syed Hussain Zaheer Medal, 2014
4. Life Fellow of Institute of Electrical and Electronics Engineers (IEEE)(USA), 2013
5. IISc Distinguished Alumnus Award, 2013
6. INAE Professor S. N. Mitra Memorial Award, 2006
7. Fellow of Indian Academy of Sciences, 2004
8. Fellow of Indian National Science Academy, 1999
9. 3rd IETE Professor S. V. C. Aiya Memorial Award, 1996
10. Fellow of Indian National Academy of Engineering, 1995

== Work in India ==
- INSA Senior Scientist, International Institute of Information Technology Hyderabad, 2017–present
- Emeritus Professor, BITS-Pilani Hyderabad campus, 2016-2017
- Institute Professor, International Institute of Information Technology Hyderabad, 2012-2016
- Professor and Microsoft Chair, International Institute of Information Technology Hyderabad, 2006-2012
- Head, Dept. of CS & E, Indian Institute of Technology Madras, Feb. 1985 - Nov. 1989
- Professor, Indian Institute of Technology Madras, 1980-2006
- Visiting Scientist, ISRO, Bangalore, July-Dec. 1980
- Assistant Professor, Indian Institute of Science, Bangalore, 1974-1978
- Lecturer, Indian Institute of Science, Bangalore, 1967-1974
- Sr. Research Assistant, Indian Institute of Science, Bangalore, 1966-1967

== Work abroad ==
- Center for Speech Technology Research, CSTR, Edinburgh, UK, May 2011
- Center for Speech Technology Research, CSTR, Edinburgh, UK, Sep. 2009
- Center for Speech Technology Research, CSTR, Edinburgh, UK, June 2008
- IDIAP research institute, Switzerland, June–July 2007
- University of Maryland, College Park, USA, Visiting Professor, May–July 2004
- Carnegie Mellon University, Pittsburgh, Visiting Professor, May–July 2003
- University of Maryland, College Park, USA, Visiting Professor, May–July 2002
- University of Maryland, College Park, USA, Visiting Professor, May–June 2001
- Oregon Graduate Institute, Portland, USA, Visiting Professor, May–July 1999
- Oregon Graduate Institute, Portland, USA, Visiting Professor, May–July 1998
- Oregon Graduate Institute, Portland, USA, Visiting Professor, May–July 1997
- Oregon Graduate Institute, Portland, USA, Visiting Professor, May–July 1996
- Eindhoven Tech. Univ., The Netherlands, Visiting Professor, July 1994 - Jan. 1995
- Rutger's University, USA, Visiting Professor, June 1994
- LIMSI, University of Paris, Orsay, France, Visiting Professor, May 1994
- Eindhoven Tech. Univ., The Netherlands, Visiting Professor, May–June 1992
- US West, Boulder, CO, USA, visiting scientist, May–June 1991
- University of Bremen, Germany, visiting scientist, May 1990
- Center for Speech Technology Research (CSTR), Edinburgh, UK, Visiting Professor, Sept. 1989
- University of Florida, Gainesville, USA, Visiting Professor, May–July 1984
- University of Florida, Gainesville, USA, Visiting Professor, May–July 1983
- CS Dept., Carnegie-Mellon University, Pittsburgh, USA, Visiting Associate Professor, 1977-1980

== Professional societies involved ==
1. Guest Editor, Sadhana, Academy Proceedings in Engineering Sciences, Special issue on Speech Communication and Signal Processing, Indian Academy of Sciences, Springer (ISSN 0256-2499), Vol.36, Number 5, October 2011.
2. International Speech Communication Association (ISCA)
3. IEEE (USA)
4. IETE (India)
5. Acoustical Society of India (India)
6. Associate Editor, IEEE Transactions on Speech & Audio Processing (2003-2006)

== Teaching interests ==
- Speech Technology
- Soft Computing
- Computing with ANN
- Digital Signal Processing
- Signals and Systems
- Principles of Communication

== Research interests ==
- Digital Signal Processing
- Speech
- Computer Vision
- Artificial Neural Networks

== Textbooks, monographs, conference proceedings - authored/edited ==
1. PR Reddy, K Sri Rama Murty and B. Yegnanarayana, Representation Learning for Spoken Term Detection, in Amita Pal and Sankar K Pal (Eds.), Pattern Recognition and Big Data, World Scientific Publishing, Oct. 2016
2. P. Gangamohan, Sudarsana Reddy Kadiri, and B. Yegnanarayana, Analysis of Emotional Speech - A Review, in Anna Esposito and Lakhmi C. Jain (Eds.), Toward Robotic Socially Believable Behaving Systems, Vol. I, Chap. 11, Springer International Publishing, pp. 205–238, Mar. 2016.
3. B. Yegnanarayana (Ed.), Speech Communication and Signal Processing, Special issue of Sadhana, Academy Proceedings in Engineering Sciences, Indian Academy of Sciences and Springer, Vol. 36, No. 5, Oct. 2011.
4. L. Rabiner, B-H. Juang, and B. Yegnanarayana, Fundamentals of speech recognition, Pearson Education Inc., Delhi (Indian Subcontinent Adaptation), 2009.
5. B. Yegnanarayana, C. Chandra Sekhar, S. Palanivel, V. Suresh, Anil Kumar Sao and Dhananjaya N., Issues in the Development of an Audio-Video based Person Authentication System, in Jana Dittmann, Claus Vielhauer and Jan Hansen (Eds.), New Advances in Multimedia Security, Biometrics, Watermarking and Cultural Aspects, pp. 53–76, Logos Verlag Berlin, Berlin, 2006.
6. S. V. Gangashetty, C. Chandra Sekhar, and B. Yegnanarayana, Spotting Multilingual Consonant-Vowel Units of Speech using Neural Network Models, in Marcos Fundez-Zanuy, ... (Eds.), Nonlinear Analyses and Algorithms for Speech Processing (Revised Selected Papers from International Conference on Non-linear Speech Processing, NOLISP 2005, Barcelona, Spain, April 19–22) (LNAI Vol. 3817, ISBN 3-540-31257-9), pp. 303–317, Springer Lecture Notes in Artificial Intelligence, 2005.
7. B. Yegnanarayana, Suryakanth V. Gangashetty, and S. Palanivel, Autoassociative Neural Network Models for Pattern Recognition Tasks in Speech and Image, in Ashish Ghosh and Sankar K. Pal (Eds.), Soft Computing Approach to Pattern Recognition and Image Processing, World Scientific Publishing Co. Pte. Ltd., Singapore, 2002.
8. B. Yegnanarayana and C. Chandra Sekhar, Pattern Recognition Issues in Speech Processing, in Sankar K. Pal, and Amita Pal (Eds.), Pattern Recognition from Classical to Modern Approaches, World Scientific Publishing Co. Pte. Ltd., Singapore, 2001.
9. B. Yegnanarayana and S. Ramesh, Solution Manual to Artificial Neural Networks by B. Yegnanarayana, New Delhi, Prentice-Hall of India, 2001.
10. B. Yegnanarayana and M. Narendranath, Neural Networks, Voice Conversion, in S. Katagiri (Ed.), Handbook of Neural Networks for Speech Processing, Artech House Inc., Massachusetts, 2000.
11. Manish Sarkar and B. Yegnanarayana, Application of Fuzzy-Rough Sets in Modular Neural Networks, in S. K. Pal and A. Skowron (Eds.), Rough Fuzzy Hybridization: A New Trend in Decision Making, Springer-Verlag Singapore Pte. Ltd., 1999.
12. [Book] B. Yegnanarayana, Artificial Neural Networks, New Delhi, Prentice-Hall of India, 1999.
13. B. Yegnanarayana, M. Narendranath and S. Rajendran, Voice Conversion, Indian Institute of Technology Madras, September 1995.
14. B. Yegnanarayana, N. Sudha, P.P. Raghu and C. Chandra Sekhar, Artificial Neural Networks for Classification of Sonar Targets, Indian Institute of Technology Madras, August 1995.
15. P. P. Raghu, R. Poongodi and B. Yegnanarayana, Application of Artificial Neural Networks in Remote Sensing, Indian Institute of Technology Madras, November 1995.
16. B. Yegnanarayana and V. R. Ramachandran, "Group Delay Processing of Speech Signals in Martin Cooke", Steve Beet and Malcom Crawford (Eds.), Visual Representations of Speech Signal, John Wiley and Sons Ltd., 1993.
17. B. Yegnanarayana et al., Proceedings of Workshop on Speech Technology, Indian Institute of Technology Madras, December 1992.
18. B. Yegnanarayana et al., Tutorial on Speech Technology, Indian Institute of Technology Madras, December 1992.
19. B. Yegnanarayana, R. Ramaseshan and A. Ravichandran, Studies in Sensor Array Imaging, Indian Institute of Technology Madras, November 1992.
20. V. V. S. Sarma, N. Viswanadham, B. Yegnanarayana and B. L. Deekshatulu, Artificial Intelligence and Expert System Technologies in the Indian Context, vol.1 & 2, Tata McGraw-Hill, 1991.
21. B. Yegnanarayana and P. V. S. Rao (Eds.), Special issue on Speech Processing, JIETE, vol.34, no.1, Jan-Feb 1988.
