= Jing Liang (computer scientist) =

Chinese computer scientist

Jing Liang (Chinese: 梁静) is a Chinese computer scientist whose research focuses on evolutionary computation, with applications including the modeling of photovoltaic generation of solar power.

== Education and career ==
Liang has a 2003 bachelor's degree from the Harbin Institute of Technology, and a 2009 Ph.D. from Nanyang Technological University in Singapore. Her dissertation, Novel Particle Swarm Optimizers with Hybrid, Dynamic & Adaptive Neighborhood Structures, was supervised by P. N. Suganthan.

She is a professor in both the School of Electrical and Information Engineering at Zhengzhou University, and the School of Electrical Engineering and Automation at the Henan Institute of Technology (HAIT) in Xinxiang.

== Recognition ==
Liang was elected as an IEEE Fellow, in the 2026 class of fellows, "for evolutionary computation for complex optimization and its real-world applications".
