= Henry Leung (engineer) =

Henry Leung from the University of Calgary, Alberta, Canada was named Fellow of the Institute of Electrical and Electronics Engineers (IEEE) in 2015 for contributions to chaotic communications and nonlinear signal processing.
