= List of fellows of IEEE Circuits and Systems Society =

The Fellow grade of membership is the highest level of membership, and cannot be applied for directly by the member – instead the candidate must be nominated by others. This grade of membership is conferred by the IEEE Board of Directors in recognition of a high level of demonstrated extraordinary accomplishment.

Year	Fellow	Citation
1968	Jose B. Cruz Jr.	For significant contributions in circuit theory and the sensitivity analysis of control systems
1970	Thomas Kailath	For inspired teaching of and contributions to information, communication, and control theory
1973	Gabor Temes	For contributions to filter theory and computer-aided circuit design
1974	Leon O. Chua	For contributions to nonlinear network theory.
1975	Lewis Terman	For contributions to the design and development of semiconductor computer memory and logic circuitry
1975	Ralph Wyndrum	For contributions to hybrid integrated circuits development and application
1977	Theodore Bickart	For contributions to theory and education in circuits and systems
1977	Wai-Kai Chen	For contributions to graph and network theory
1977	Timothy Trick	For contributions to the analysis of communication circuits and to engineering education
1978	Alan N. Willson Jr.	For contributions to circuit and system theory in the area of nonlinear circuits
1978	John Bandler	For contributions to computer-oriented microwave and circuit practices
1978	Ching C Li	For contributions to biocybernetics
1978	George Moschytz	For contributions to the theory and the development of hybrid-integrated linear communication networks
1980	MNS Swamy	For leadership in engineering education and contributions to circuits theory
1980	Yoshihiro Tohma	For contributions to the theory and design of fault-tolerant digital systems, and to engineering education
1981	Leonard Bruton	For contributions to the theory and design of active circuits
1981	William Howard	For contributions to the advancement of semiconductor circuits and devices, especially analog and digital LSI technology
1981	Robert Meyer	For contributions to analysis and design of high-frequency amplifiers
1982	Stanley White	For contributions to digital signal processing techniques and applications.
1982	Andreas Antoniou	For contributions to active and digital filters, and to electrical engineering education.
1982	P Dewilde	For contributions to network theory, especially the synthesis of scattering matrices
1982	Paul Jespers	For leadership in microelectronics research, development, and education
1982	Bruce Wooley	For contributions to the design of integrated circuits for communications systems.
1983	Kenneth Laker	For contributions to filter design and microcircuit implementation
1983	Mathukumalli Vidyasagar	For contributions to the stability analysis of linear and nonlinear distributed systems.
1983	Alberto Sangiovanni-Vincentelli	For contributions to circuit simulation and computer aids for the design of integrated circuits.
1984	Maurice Bellanger	For contributions to the theory of digital filtering, and the applications to communication systems.
1984	Robert Dutton	For contributions to computer-aided modeling of silicon devices and fabrication processes
1984	Tatsuo Ohtsuki	For contributions to circuit theory and computer-aided circuit analysis
1984	Adel Sedra	For contributions to the theory and design of active-RC and switched-capacitor filters, and to engineering education.
1985	John P. Hayes	For contributions to digital testing techniques and to switching theory and logical design.
1985	Mohamed Mansour	For contributions to the theory of discrete systems, and for organizing and directing an outstanding computer control laboratory
1986	Hugo De Man	For contributions to simulation, analysis and optimization of devices, MOS circuits, and sampled data systems.
1986	Anantha Pai	For contributions to the applications of control theory to large-scale power system stability
1986	Rolf Schaumann	For contributions to the design of active and integrated filters, and to engineering education
1987	Wasfy Mikhael	For contributions to the development of hybrid and integrated filtering circuits and systems.
1987	Ca Salama	For contributions to the development of power semiconductor devices and the design of integrated circuits.
1988	Ralph Cavin	For technical contributions in systems and signal processing.
1988	Earl Swartzlander	For contributions to VLSI design of specialized signal processors
1989	Herbert Thal	For contributions to the application of computer-aided procedures in the development of microwave components
1989	Hideo Fujiwara	For contributions to research and development on testing of large integrated circuits.
1989	Yrjö Neuvo	For contributions to digital-signal processing algorithms and engineering education
1989	V Ramachandran	For contributions to theory of multivariable networks with applications to two-dimensional digital filters
1989	E Vittoz	For contributions to the development of micropower integrated circuits.
1989	Thomas Williams	For leadership and contributions to the area of design for testability.
1990	Mohamed El-hawary	For contributions to the theory of optimal economic operation of hydrothermal power systems
1990	Randy Geiger	For contributions to discrete and integrated analog circuit design.
1990	Sung Mo Kang	For technical contributions to and leadership in the development of computer-aided design of very-large-scale integrated (VLSI) circuits and systems
1990	Hans-jo Pfleiderer	For contributions to CCD circuit and filter design.
1990	Isao Shirakawa	For contributions to network theory and its applications to computer-aided circuit analysis and design
1991	John Darringer	For contributions to the development of practical techniques and algorithms for automated logic synthesis of high-performance computers
1991	Alice C. Parker	For contributions to design automation in the areas of high-level synthesis, hardware descriptive languages, and design representation.
1991	Robert Bitmead	For contributions to the development of the theory of adaptive control and filtering.
1991	Adrian Brokaw	For innovations in analog circuit design.
1991	C Burckhardt	For contributions to diagnostic ultrasound imaging.
1991	Narsingh Deo	For contributions to graph theory, algorithms, and applications
1991	Kenneth Martin	For contribution to the mathematical theory of linear and nonlinear systems.
1991	Andrzej Strojwas	For contributions to statistically-based computer-aided manufacturing of integrated circuits
1991	Robert Trew	For contributions to the development of physical models and computer-aided design tools for microwave solid-state devices and circuits
1991	P Vaidyanathan	For contributions to digital signal processing and engineering education.
1992	David Allstot	For contributions to the analysis and design of switched-capacitor and analog integrated circuits.
1992	Bryan Ackland	For contributions to the design of custom integrated circuits for signal processing systems.
1992	Phillip Allen	For contributions to electrical engineering education and microelectronics textbooks.
1992	Sergio Cova	For contributions to the instrumentation of nuclear electronics, in particular, the conception and demonstration of silicon single-photon detectors.
1992	Arpad Csurgay	For contributions to electromagnetic theory, the reliability theory of distributed networks, and for scientific leadership
1992	Hamid Gharavi	For contributions to low bit-rate video coding and research in subband coding for image and video applications.
1992	Joos Vandewalle	For contributions to the mathematics of nonlinear circuits and systems
1992	Edgar Sanchez-sinencio	For contributions to monolithic analog filter design
1993	Jules Bellisio	For contributions to and leadership in the conception and realization of digital television systems for current and emerging telecommunication networks.
1993	Pier Paolo Civalleri	For contributions to the theory, analysis, and synthesis of analog circuits with applications to wideband active and distributed systems, and for contributions to engineering education.
1993	Martin Hasler	For contributions to research and teaching in nonlinear circuits theory.
1993	D Hill	For contributions to the stability analysis of complex interconnected nonlinear dynamical systems and applications to power systems
1993	Clifford Lau	For technical and managerial contributions to neural networks and electrical system reliability
1993	Josef Nossek	For contributions to the design of discrete-time networks and technical leadership in the development of radio communication systems
1993	John Sewell	For contributions to the analysis and synthesis of continuous-time and sampled-data signal-processing systems with associated computer-aided design techniques.
1994	Sunil Das	For contributions to switching theory and computer design.
1994	Anthony Davies	For contributions to the theory and analysis of active networks
1994	Giovanni De Micheli	For contribution to synthesis algorithms for the design of electronic circuits and systems.
1994	Daniel Gajski	For contributions to VLSI and system level design methodologies and CAD tools.
1994	Bernard Levy	For contributions to the modeling and estimation of multidimensional random processes.
1994	Tsutomu Sasao	For contributions to the design theory and techniques of combinational logic circuits.
1995	Periasamy Rajan	For contributions to research and teaching in multi-dimensional circuit theory and signal processing
1995	Suhash Dutta Roy	For contributions to research in digital and analog signal processing
1995	Yih-fang Huang	For fundamental contributions to set-membership identification for signal processing and control systems
1995	Jose Huertas	For contributions to the synthesis and design of non-linear networks, especially in the case of chaotic, neural, and fuzzy networks
1995	Kozo Kinoshita	For contributions to testing methods for memory and logic circuits
1995	Willy Sansen	For contributions to the systematic design of analog integrated circuits.
1996	Wayne Luplow	For leadership in establishing then terrestrial broadcast system of digital high definition for North America.
1996	Radoslaw Biernacki	For contributions to the theory and implementation of microwave and analog CAD technology.
1996	Kurt Keutzer	For contributions to logic synthesis and computer-aided design; specifically for the development of algorithms for the optimization of area, delay, testability, and power of digital circuits
1996	Franco Maloberti	For contributions to design methodologies for analog integrated circuits and outstanding leadership in microelectronics education and research
1996	Tetsuo Nishi	For contributions to linear and nonlinear circuit theory.
1996	Vojin Oklobdzija	For contributions to computer architecture
1996	Keshab K. Parhi	For contributions to the fields of VLSI digital signal processing architectures, design methodologies and tools.
1996	A Rodriguez-vazquez	For contributions to the design and applications of analog/digital nonlinear ICs
1996	Fathi Salem	For contributions to the development of tools for the analysis and design of nonlinear and chaotic circuits and systems
1996	Bing Sheu	For contributions to signal processing and neural network systems using VLSI processors
1997	Maciej Ogorzalek	For contributions to the theory, analysis, and control of nonlinear dynamic systems and chaotic phenomena
1997	H Clark Bell	For advancements in synthesis techniques and development of new prototype networks for microwave filters.
1997	Guanrong Chen	For fundamental contributions to the theory and applications of chaos control and bifurcation analysis.
1997	Patricia Daniels	For contributions to engineering education
1997	Edward Delp	For contributions to image compression and processing
1997	Jose Epifaniodafranca	For contributions to analog MultiMate signal processing and engineering education
1997	Andrzej Filipkowski	For contributions to engineering education.
1997	Rokuya Ishii	For contributions to the theory of and applications to digital signal processing
1997	Mohammed Ismail	For contributions to analog VLSI circuits and signal processing
1997	Michitaka Kameyama	For contributions to the development of multiple-valued intelligent integrated systems
1997	Mitsumasa Koyanagi	For the invention of the stacked capacitor DRAM cell
1997	Henrique Malvar	For contributions to the theory and practice of lapped transforms, fast multirate filter banks, and signal coding
1997	Peter Pirsch	For contributions to the architectural conception and VLSI implementation of digital video coding schemes
1997	Richard Snyder	For contributions to the development of high power miniature stopband filters and extremely wideband bandpass filters for microwave applications.
1997	Kou-hu Tzou	For contributions and leadership to the technology of progressive image transmission and video compression technology
1997	Thayamkulangara Viswanathan	For contributions to the design and implementation of mixed-signal integrated circuits and systems.
1998	A Constantinides	For contributions to the development of digital signal processing methods.
1998	Michael Lightner	For contributions to the Computer-Aided Design of Integrated Circuits
1998	Kwong Shu Chao	For contributions in nonlinear and analog circuits.
1998	Tadayoshi Enomoto	For contributions to the development of integrated circuits multimedia.
1998	Barry Gilbert	For development of improved electronic packaging for high performance gallium arsenide integrated circuits.
1998	Michael Kennedy	For contributions to the theory of neural networks and nonlinear dynamics, and for leadership in nonlinear circuits research and education
1998	Anthony Kuh	For contributions to the analysis of neural network models and their application to signal processing
1998	Michel Nakhla	For contributions to the development of advanced CAD techniques for microwave circuits and high-speed interconnects
1998	Ali Saberi	For contributions to singular perturbation theory and nonlinear control
1998	Gerald Sheble	For contributions to the development of Auction Methods as an alternative to power system optimization methods addressing the de-regulation of the electric utility business
1998	Marilyn Wolf	For contributions to Hardware/Software Co-Design
1999	Christopher Silva	For contributions in the application of nonlinear circuits and systems theory to communications signal processing
1999	Yu Hen Hu	For contributions to parallel VLSI algorithms and architectures
1999	Magdy Bayoumi	For contributions to application specific digital signal processing architectures and computer arithmetic.
1999	Stephen Boyd	For contributions to the design and analysis of control systems using convex optimization based CAD tools.
1999	Oren Kesler	For contributions to the theory and practice of antennas and sensors
1999	Wolfgang Max Mathis	For contributions to nonlinear network theory
1999	Kyu Tae Park	For contributions to education in computer and image processing technology and for technical leadership
1999	Gabor Peceli	For contributions to the theory and practice of recursive signal transformations
1999	Heiner Ryssel	For introduction of ion implantation technology into the German Semiconductor Industry
1999	Michael Soderstrand	For contributions to engineering education in curriculum development and contributions to analog and digital signal processing.
1999	Yervant Zorian	For contributions to built-in self-test of complex devices and systems.
2000	Mani Soma	For contributions to mixed analog-digital system design-for-test.
2000	Raul Camposano	For contributions to behavioral synthesis of integrated circuits and systems.
2000	Kwang-ting Cheng	For contributions to innovative techniques for testing and synthesis of electronic circuits.
2000	Paulo S. R. Diniz	For fundamental contributions to the design and implementation of fixed and adaptive filters and Electrical Engineering Education.
2000	Abbas El Gamal	For pioneering application of probability and statistics to develop new methods for the analysis and design of integrated circuits.
2000	Manfred Glesner	For contributions to the development of microelectronic system design and education in microelectronics.
2000	Weiping Li	For contributions to image and video coding algorithms, standards, and implementations
2000	Yong-ching Lim	For contributions to the design of FIR digital filters
2000	Soo-chang Pei	For contributions to the development of digital eigenfilter design, color image coding and signal compression, and to electrical engineering education in Taiwan
2000	Jaime Ramirez-angulo	For contributions to design methodologies for Analog Signal Processing Integrated Circuits
2001	M. Omair Ahmad	For contributions to the design and implementation of digital signal processing algorithms.
2001	Liang-gee Chen	For contributions to algorithm and architecture design for video coding systems.
2001	Jingsheng Cong	For contributions to the computer-aided design of integrated circuits, especially in physical design automation, interconnect optimization, and synthesis of field-programmable gate-arrays.
2001	Geert De Veirman	For contributions to the design of continuous-time filters and hard-disk drive read channel ICs
2001	Wei Hwang	For contributions to high density cell technology and high speed Dynamic Random Access Memory design
2001	David Johns	For contributions to the theory and design of analog adaptive integrated circuits used in digital communications
2001	Massoud Pedram	For contributions to the theory and practice of low-power design and CAD
2001	Masakazu Sengoku	For contributions to graph theoretic research on circuits and communication network systems
2001	Bertram Shi	For contributions to the analysis, implementation and application of cellular neural networks
2001	Shoji Shinoda	For contributions to graph-theoretic researches on flow and tension networks, electrical circuits, and cellular mobile communication systems
2001	Hui-fang Sun	For contributions to digital video technologies including coding optimization, down-conversion, and error resilience
2001	Jacques Szczupak	For contributions to engineering education and to analog and digital signal processing
2002	Georges Ge Gielen	For contributions to computer-aided design and design automation of analog and mixed-signal integrated circuits and systems.
2002	M Ahmadi	For contributions to the design of digital filters, and to pattern recognition and image restoration.
2002	Sankar Basu	For contributions to theory and application of multidimensional circuits, systems, and signal processing.
2002	Hsueh-ming Hang	For contributions to video compression algorithms and systems.
2002	J Haslett	For contributions to high temperature instrumentation and noise in solid-state electronics
2002	Sayfe Kiaei	For contributions in low-power, low-noise CMOS logic
2002	Lawrence Pileggi	For contributions to simulation and modeling of integrated circuits
2002	Kaushik Roy	For contributions to the power-aware design of digital circuits.
2002	Tapio Saramäki	For contributions to the design and implementation of digital filters and filter banks
2002	Carl Sechen	For contributions to automated placement and routing in integrated circuits
2002	Jan Van Der Spiegel	For contributions in biologically motivated sensors and information processing systems
2003	Yuval Bistritz	For contributions to the stability theory of multi-dimensional linear systems and applications to estimation and interpolation problems
2003	John Cohn	For contributions to the development of CAD tools and design methodology for high-performance custom integrated circuits.
2003	Wai-chi Fang	For contributions to VLSI systems using neural-based methods.
2003	Graham Jullien	For contributions to the application of number theoretic techniques in signal processing
2003	Toshio Koga	For contributions to video compression technologies based on motion compensation and for the development of digital television transmission equipment and systems
2003	Farid Najm	For contributions to estimation and modeling of power dissipation in integrated circuits
2003	Tony Ng	For contributions to signal processing techniques in spread spectrum communications
2003	Akinori Nishihara	For contributions to the theory and design of digital signal processing
2003	Sachin Sapatnekar	For contributions to the optimization of timing and layout in VLSI circuits.
2004	Miroslav Begovic	For leadership in developing analysis tools and protection techniques for electric power transmission systems and renewable generation.
2004	Jerome Blair	For contributions to the design and testing of analog to digital converters.
2004	Hou Chaohuan	For technical leadership in advancing VLSI system technology
2004	Xuemin Chen	For contributions to video coding standardization and its implementation for satellite and cable communication systems.
2004	Alexander Fradkov	For contributions to adaptive and nonlinear systems.
2004	Erik Heijne	For contributions to semiconductor detector systems and radiation tolerant detector readout electronics.
2004	Graham Hellestrand	For contributions to computer system architecture simulations
2004	Adrian Ioinovici	For contributions to switched-capacitor based power electronic circuits
2004	Beomsup Kim	For contributions to integrated circuits for high speed communication systems
2004	Colin Mcandrew	For contributions to compact and statistical modeling of semiconductor devices
2004	Yukihir Nakamura	For contributions to very large scale integration synthesis methodologies
2004	Gordon Roberts	For contributions to the design and test of analog and mixed-signal integrated circuits, and education
2004	Mohamad Sawan	For contributions to implantable medical devices.
2004	Moe Win	For contributions to wideband wireless transmission
2005	Ljiljana Trajković	For contributions to computer aided design tools for circuit analysis.
2005	P Anandamohan	For contributions to telecommunications technologies.
2005	Duane Boning	For contributions to modeling and control in semiconductor manufacturing
2005	Francky Catthoor	For contributions to data and memory management for embedded system-on-a-chip applications.
2005	Douglas Frey	For contributions in the theory and design of linear and nonlinear circuits and systems.
2005	Izzet Goknar	For contributions to the analysis, simulation and synthesis of nonlinear networks.
2005	Geza Kolumban	For contributions to double sampled phase-locked loops and noncoherent chaotic communications
2005	Joy Laskar	For contributions to the modeling and development of high frequency communication modules
2005	Hanoch Lev-ari	For contributions to adaptive filtering and structured estimation for non-stationary signals
2005	Derong Liu	For contributions to nonlinear dynamical systems and recurrent neural networks
2005	Kartikeya Mayaram	For contributions to coupled device and circuit simulation
2005	Amy Reibman	For contributions to the transport of video over networks.
2005	Alle-jan Van Der Veen	For contributions to signal processing for source separation and communications.
2006	Frederick Raab	For contributions to modeling and design of high-efficiency power amplifiers and radio transmitters
2006	Bhupendra Ahuja	For contributions to design of mixed signal complementary metal oxide semiconductor (CMOS) integrated circuits for telecommunications and computer communications systems.
2006	Andreas Andreou	For contributions to energy efficient sensory microsystems.
2006	Ramesh Harjani	For contributions to the design and computer aided design (CAD) of analog and radio frequency circuits.
2006	Ian Hiskens	For contributions to modeling and analysis of power systems.
2006	Andre Ivanov	For contributions to intellectual property (IP) for system on a chip (SoC) testing
2006	Ljupco Kocarev	For contributions to chaotic and nonlinear circuits and systems
2006	Alex Kot	For contributions to performance analysis systems and jammer suppression in communication systems
2006	Wolfgang Kunz	For contributions to hardware verification, very large scale integrated (VLSI) circuit testing and logic synthesis
2006	Douglas O'Shaughnessy	For contributions to education in speech processing and communication
2006	S. Pookaiyaudom	For contributions to circuits and systems and engineering education.
2006	John Sahalos	For contributions to antenna analysis and design.
2006	Gianluca Setti	For contributions to application of nonlinear dynamics to communications, signal processing, and information technology.
2006	Gary Sullivan	For contributions to video coding and its standardization.
2006	Chi Tse	For contributions to power electronics circuits and applications.
2006	Andreas Weisshaar	For contributions to modeling of on-chip interconnects and integrated passive microwave components.
2006	Burnell West	For contributions to high-performance automatic test equipment
2006	Martin Wong	For contributions to algorithmic aspects of computer-aided design (CAD) of very large scale integrated (VLSI) circuits and systems.
2006	Nan-ning Zheng	For contributions to information processing.
2007	Athanasios Stouraitis	For contributions to high-performance digital signal processing architectures and computer arithmetic
2007	Bhargab Bhattacharya	For contributions to testing and design of digital integrated circuits
2007	Flavio Canavero	For contributions to the modeling of circuit and electronic interconnects
2007	Grace Clark	For contributions in block adaptive filtering
2007	Peter H De With	For contributions to compression techniques and architecture of television and recording systems
2007	Fadhel Ghannouchi	For contributions to advanced microwave amplification circuits and sub-systems
2007	Stefan Heinen	For contributions to radio frequency integrated circuits and wireless systems
2007	Takayuki Kawahara	For contributions to low-voltage low-power random access memory circuits
2007	Alexander Loui	For contributions to digital image content management systems
2007	Clark Tu-cuong Nguyen	For contributions to the physics and technology of microelectromechanical systems
2007	Antonio Ortega	For contributions to image and video communications
2007	Gaetano Palumbo	For contributions to analysis and design of high performance analog and digital circuits
2007	David Skellern	For contributions to high speed devices and systems for wireless and wireline communications networks
2007	Annamaria Varkonyi-koczy	For contributions to digital signal processing in measurement and control
2008	Bernd Becker	For contributions to the development of algorithms and data structures for testing and verification of integrated circuits
2008	Joe Brewer	For contributions to nonvolatile memory integrated circuit technology and digital signal processor architecture
2008	Krishnendu Chakrabarty	For contributions to the testing of core-based system-on-chip integrated circuits
2008	Pau-choo Chung	For contributions to neural network models for biomedical image analyses
2008	Yuguang Fang	For contributions to wireless networks and mobile computing systems
2008	Ling Guan	For contributions to image and multimedia signal processing
2008	Bertrand Hochwald	For contributions to multiple-input-multiple-output wireless communications
2008	Eishi Ibe	For contributions to neutron-induced soft-error analysis for semiconductor memory devices
2008	Ming-dou Ker	For contributions to electrostatic protection in integrated circuits, and performance optimization of VLSI micro-systems
2008	Nam Ling	For contributions to video coding algorithms and architectures
2008	Bram Nauta	For contributions to integrated analog circuit design
2008	Levent Onural	For contributions to signal processing for optics, diffraction and holography
2008	Alexander Petroianu	For contributions to analytical tools for system security and training of system operators
2008	Markku Renfors	For contributions to digital signal processing algorithms
2008	Massimo Rudan	For contributions to theory and modeling of current transport in semiconductor devices
2008	Jyuo-min Shyu	For leadership in the microelectronics industry
2008	Rui Silvamartins	For leadership in engineering education
2008	Hoi-jun Yoo	For contributions to low-power and high-speed VLSI design
2008	Xinghuo Yu	For contributions to variable structure systems theory and applications in intelligent and complex systems
2009	Sheila Hemami	For contributions to robust and perceptual image and video communications
2009	Ronald Blanton	For contributions to testing of microelectromechanical systems and integrated circuits
2009	Gerhard Fettweis	For contributions to signal processing algorithms and chip implementation architectures for communications
2009	Shoji Kawahito	For contributions to sensor interfacing, sensor signal processing and multiple-level signaling
2009	Yong Lian	For contributions to the design of low-power high-performance digital filters
2009	Jiebo Luo	For contributions to semantic image understanding and intelligent image processing
2009	Un-ku Moon	For contributions to low voltage complementary metal-oxide semiconductor mixed-signal technology
2009	Joel Phillips	For contributions to numerical techniques in the design of high-frequency and radio frequency systems
2009	Jie Wu	For contributions to mobile ad hoc networks and multicomputer systems
2009	Enrico Zanoni	For contributions to reliability of compound semiconductor devices
2010	Georg Brasseur	For developments in electronic diesel engine control
2010	Tor Lande	For contributions to low-power subthreshold circuit design
2010	Yusuf Leblebici	For contributions to reliability and design techniques for integrated circuits and systems
2010	Peter Maxwell	For contributions to testing of digital logic circuits
2010	Anand Raghunathan	For contributions to the design of low-power and secure systems on chip
2010	Jose Silva	For contributions to Complementary Metal-Oxide Semiconductor transconductance amplifiers and continuous-time filters
2010	Shumpei Yamazaki	For contributions to, and leadership in the industrialization of non-volatile memory and thin film transistor technologies
2010	Howard Yang	For leadership in mixed-signal integrated circuit design and manufacturing
2010	Wenwu Zhu	For contributions to video communications over the internet and wireless
2010	Bernabé Linares-Barranco	For contributions to the design and application of linear and nonlinear circuits in neuromorphic systems
2011	Shuvra Bhattacharyya	For contributions to design optimization for signal processing
2011	Guohong Cao	For contributions to algorithm and protocol design for mobile ad hoc and sensor networks
2011	Gert Cauwenberghs	For contributions to integrated biomedical instrumentation
2011	Moncef Gabbouj	For contributions to nonlinear signal processing and video communication
2011	Peter Kinget	For contributions to analog and radio frequency integrated circuits
2011	Sakae Okubo	For contributions to video coding and multimedia communication systems
2011	Susanto Rahardja	For leadership in digital audio and signal processing
2011	Gabriel Rincon-mora	For contributions to energy and power integrated circuit design
2011	Wouter Serdijn	For contributions to integrated circuits for medical devices and wireless communications
2011	Myung Hoon Sunwoo	For contributions to multimedia and communications
2011	Prab Varma	For contributions to system-on-chip test technology
2011	Anthony Vetro	For contributions to video coding, three-dimensional television, and multimedia adaptation
2011	Vijaykrishnan Narayanan	For contributions to power-aware systems and estimation tools
2012	Robert Adams	For contributions to analog and digital signal processing
2012	Yen-kuang Chen	For contributions to algorithm-architecture co-design for multimedia signal processing
2012	Alper Demir	For contributions to stochastic modelling and analysis of phase noise
2012	Mario Di Bernardo	For contributions to the analysis, control and applications of nonlinear systems and complex networks
2012	Douglas Garrity	For contributions to analog-to-digital converters for embedded applications
2012	Rudy Lauwereins	For contributions to data flow models in real-time prototyping
2012	Wolfgang Nebel	For contributions to the design of low-power circuits and systems
2012	Konstantin Plataniotis	For contributions to the theory and application of statistical adaptive learning
2012	Janusz Rajski	For contributions to digital VLSI circuit testing and test compression
2012	Riccardo Rovatti	For contributions to nonlinear and statistical signal processing applied to electronic systems
2012	Luis Silveira	For contributions to analysis and modeling of VLSI interconnects
2012	Wan Chi Siu	For leadership in signal processing and contributions to video technologies
2012	Stephen Trimberger	For contributions to circuits, architectures and software technology for fleld-programmable gate arrays
2012	Chin-liang Wang	For contributions to signal processing algorithms and architectures for digital communications
2012	Jiangtao Wen	For contributions to multimedia communication technology and standards
2012	John Poulton	For contributions to high-speed low-power signaling and to graphics architecture
2013	Arthur Morris	For development and commercialization of CMOS radio frequency micro electro mechanical systems
2013	Ramachandra Achar	For contributions to interconnect and signal integrity analysis in high-speed designs
2013	Robert Aitken	For contributions to testing and diagnosis of integrated circuits
2013	Russel Baker	For contributions to the design of memory integrated circuits
2013	David Bull	For contributions in video analysis, compression and communications
2013	Tzi-dar Chiueh	For contributions to baseband processing integrated circuits for communications systems
2013	Marco Corsi	For development of high-speed amplifiers and analog to-digital convertors
2013	Lina Karam	For contributions to perception-based visual processing, image and video communications, and digital filtering
2013	James Libous	For contributions to switching noise minimization in CMOS technology
2013	Danilo Mandic	For contributions to multivariate and nonlinear learning systems
2013	Radu Marculescu	For contributions to design and optimization of on-chip communication for embedded multicore systems
2013	Igor L. Markov	For contributions to optimization methods in electronic design automation
2013	Chris Myers	For contributions to design and testing for asynchronous, analog, and genetic circuits
2013	Chika Nwankpa	For contributions to real-time computation in power system analysis
2013	Masayuki Tanimoto	For contributions to the development of free-viewpoint television and its MPEG standard
2013	David Perreault	For contributions to design and application of very high frequency power electronic converters
2013	Ingrid Verbauwhede	For contributions to design of secure integrated circuits and systems
2014	Richard Brown	For contributions to microsystem design
2014	Mircea Stan	For contributions to power- and temperature-aware design of VLSI circuits and systems
2014	Poras Balsara	For contributions to the design of all-digital frequency synthesis
2014	Soumitro Banerjee	For contributions to the understanding of nonlinear phenomena in power electronic circuits, and to the theory of border collision bifurcation
2014	Jan Craninckx	For contributions to the design of CMOS RF transceivers
2014	Tobias Delbruck	For contributions to neuromorphic visual sensors and processing
2014	Robert Ewing	For contributions to electronic system design in avionics
2014	Robert Gilmore	For contributions to high-performance and low-power wireless portable communications devices
2014	Helmut Graeb	For contributions to design centering and structural analysis of analog circuits
2014	Tanay Karnik	For contributions to error-tolerant circuits and near-load voltage regulators
2014	Amir Said	For contributions to compression and processing of images and videos
2014	Patrick Thiran	For contributions to network performance analysis
2014	Trac Duy Tran	For contributions to multirate and sparse signal processing
2014	Martin Vlach	For leadership in analog and mixed signal hardware description languages and their simulation tools
2014	Wei Zheng	For contributions to signal processing and system identification
2015	Joseph Cavallaro	For contributions to VLSI architectures and algorithms for signal processing and wireless communications
2015	Edmund Lam	For contributions to modeling and computational algorithms in imaging applications
2015	Jordi Cortadella	For contributions to the design of asynchronous and elastic circuits
2015	Rolf Drechsler	For contributions to test and verification of electronic circuits and systems
2015	Michael Flynn	For contributions to integrated analog-digital interfaces
2015	Deepnarayan Gupta	For contributions to superconductor digital radio-frequency receivers
2015	Henry Leung	For contributions to chaotic communications and nonlinear signal processing
2015	Wenjing Lou	For contributions to information and network security
2015	Diana Marculescu	For contributions to design and optimization of energy-aware computing systems
2015	Gianluca Mazzini	For contributions to chaos-based electronic and telecommunication systems design
2015	Boris Murmann	For contributions to the design of digitally-assisted analog integrated circuits
2015	Wonyong Sung	For contributions to real-time signal processing systems
2015	Johan Suykens	For developing the least squares support vector machines
2015	An-yeu (Andy) Wu	For contributions to DSP algorithms and VLSI designs for communication IC/SoC
2015	Yuan Xie	For contributions to design automation and architecture of three-dimensional integrated circuits
2015	Huaguang Zhang	For contributions to stability analysis of recurrent neural networks and intelligent control of nonlinear systems
2016	Massimo Alioto	For contributions to energy-efficient VLSI circuits
2016	David Atienza	For contributions to design methods and tools for multiprocessor systems on chip
2016	Kwabena Boahen	For contributions to system design for neuromorphic chip
2016	Jinde Cao	For contributions to the analysis of neural networks
2016	Sandro Carrara	For contributions to design of nanoscale biological CMOS sensors
2016	Henry Chung	For contributions to power electronic converters for lighting
2016	Xian-Sheng Hua	For contributions to multimedia content analysis and image search
2016	Jiwu Huang	For contributions to multimedia data hiding and forensics
2016	Avinoam Kolodny	For contributions to VLSI design and automation tools
2016	Jie Chen	For contributions to low-power and biomedical ultrasound circuits and devices
2016	Xilin Chen	For contributions machine vision for facial image analysis and sign language recognition
2016	Tzyy-shen Horng	For contributions to system-in-package modeling and design
2016	Xian-sheng Hua	For contributions to multimedia content analysis and image search
2016	Hitoshi Kiya	For contributions to filter structure, data hiding, and multimedia security
2016	Peng Li	For contributions to the analysis and modeling of integrated circuits and systems
2016	Tsorng-juu Liang	For contributions to power conversion for lighting and sustainable energy
2016	Gabriele Manganaro	For leadership in the design of high-speed converters
2016	Toru Tanzawa	For contributions to integrated high-voltage circuits
2016	Yeo Kiat Seng	For contributions to low-power integrated circuit design
2016	Bing Zeng	For contributions to image and video coding
2017	Valeria Bertacco	For contributions to computer-aided verification and reliable system design
2017	Lap-pui Chau	For contributions to fast computation algorithms for visual signal processing
2017	Kiyoung Choi	For contribution to low-power, real-time, and reconfigurable systems
2017	Sorin Cotofana	For contributions to nanocomputing architectures and paradigms
2017	Ricardo De Queiroz	For contributions to image and video signal enhancement and compression
2017	Payam Heydari	For contributions to silicon-based millimeter-wave integrated circuits and systems
2017	Kenji Itoh	For contributions to microwave harmonic mixers and applications to mobile terminal devices
2017	Juri Jatskevich	For contributions to modeling of electric machines and switching converters
2017	Deog-kyoon Jeong	For development of Digital Video Interface and High Definition Multimedia Interface standards
2017	Xin Li	For contributions to modeling, analysis, and optimization of variability of integrated circuits and systems
2017	Donald Lie	For contributions to high linearity and high efficiency silicon RF power amplifiers for broadband wireless applications
2017	Frank Liu	For contributions to design for manufacturability of VLSI circuits
2017	Enrico Magli	For contributions to compression and communication of remotely sensed imagery
2017	Junichi Nakamura	For leadership in CMOS image sensors
2017	Panos Nasiopoulos	For leadership in DVD authoring and digital multimedia technologies
2017	Borivoje Nikolic	For contributions to energy-efficient design of digital and mixed-signal circuits
2017	Salvatore Pennisi	For contributions to multistage CMOS operational amplifiers
2017	Youngsoo Shin	For contributions to design tools for low power, high speed VLSI circuits and systems
2017	Andrei Vladimirescu	For contributions to the development and commercial adoption of SPICE circuit simulation
2017	Zhihua Wang	For contributions to circuits and microsystems for medical applications
2017	Ce Zhu	For contributions to video coding and communications
2017	Cyril Luxey	For the development of small antennas, multi-antenna system integration, and high performance mm-wave systems
2018	Stefano Grivet-talocia	For contributions to passive macromodeling for signal and power integrity
2018	Pamela Abshire	For contributions to CMOS biosensors
2018	Chip Hong Chang	For contributions to hardware security
2018	Yiran Chen	For contributions to spintronic memory
2018	Riccardo Leonardi	For contributions to image and video compression and multimedia semantic content analysis
2018	Chia-wen Lin	For contributions to multimedia coding and editing
2018	Saibal Mukhopadhyay	For contributions to energy-efficient and robust computing systems design
2018	Hidetoshi Onodera	For contributions to variation-aware design and analysis of integrated circuits
2018	Shanthi Pavan	For contributions to delta sigma modulators, and analog filters
2018	Earl McCune	For leadership in polar modulation circuits and signals
2018	Massimo Poncino	For contributions to low-power circuits and systems
2018	Juergen Teich	For contributions to hardware/software co-design for embedded systems
2018	Li-c Wang	For contributions to statistical timing analysis for integrated circuits
2019	Joseph Evans	For contributions to cognitive networks and deployment of defense networks
2019	Meng-fan Chang	For contributions to static and nonvolatile memories for embedded systems
2019	Deming Chen	For contributions to FPGA high-level synthesis
2019	Antun Domic	For technical leadership in the integrated circuits design automation
2019	Luca Fanucci	For the contributions to the design of Very-large-scale integration systems for network-on-chip
2019	Maysam Ghovanloo	For contributions to implantable wireless integrated circuits and systems
2019	Zeng-guang Hou	For contributions to neural network optimization and control for rehabilitation
2019	Pui-in Mak	For contributions to radio-frequency and analog circuits
2019	Tao Mei	For contributions to multimedia analysis and applications
2019	Maurizio Porfiri	For contributions to biomimetic robotics
2019	Seishi Takamura	For application of video coding
2019	Yap-peng Tan	For contributions to visual data analysis and processing
2019	Shaojun Wei	For leadership in integrated circuits engineering of smart cards and reconfigurable devices
2019	Jared Zerbe	For contributions to the development of high performance serial interfaces
2019	Jill M. Boyce	For contributions to video coding
2020	Maciej Ciesielski	For contributions to logic synthesis and formal verification of arithmetic circuits
2020	Partha Pratim Pande	For contributions to network-on-chip architectures for manycore computing
2021	Gang Qu	For contributions to hardware intellectual property protection and security
2021	Mehdi Tahoori	For contributions to resilient nanoscale integrated circuits
2021	Dmitri Maslov	For contributions to quantum circuit synthesis and optimization, and compiling for quantum computers
2021	Yung-Hsiang Lu	For contributions to energy efficiency of computer systems
2026	Wei ZHang	For contributions to agile design flow for FPGA and software-hardware co-design for embedded system security

== See also ==
- List of IEEE Fellows
