= List of fellows of IEEE Solid-State Circuits Society =

In the Institute of Electrical and Electronics Engineers, a small number of members are designated as fellows for having made significant accomplishments to the field. The IEEE Fellows are grouped by the institute according to their membership in the member societies of the institute. This list is of IEEE Fellows from the IEEE Solid-State Circuits Society (IEEE-SSCS).

| Year | Fellow | Citation |
|---|---|---|
| 1972 | Robert W. Newcomb | for contributions to network synthesis, time-varying systems, and engineering education |
| 1973 | Gabor Temes | for contributions to filter theory and computer-aided circuit design |
| 1974 | Marvin White | for contributions to the theory and development of solid-state electronic devices, especially memory transistors and charge-coupled imaging arrays |
| 1975 | Lewis Terman | for contributions to the design and development of semiconductor computer memory and logic circuitry |
| 1975 | Ralph Wyndrum | for contributions to hybrid integrated circuits development and application |
| 1978 | Frederick H. Dill | for contributions to semiconductor device and process research |
| 1978 | George Moschytz | for contributions to the theory and the development of hybrid-integrated linear communication networks |
| 1978 | Kenneth C. Smith | for contributions to digital circuit design |
| 1978 | James Solomon | for contributions in research, design, and application of analog integrated circuits |
| 1979 | Alan Grebene | for contributions to the development of monolithic linear integrated circuits and leadership in engineering administration and management |
| 1982 | Robert W. Brodersen | for contributions to the development of integrated circuits for signal processing |
| 1982 | Marcian E. Hoff | for the conception and development of the microprocessor |
| 1982 | Paul Jespers | for leadership in microelectronics research, development, and education |
| 1982 | Bruce Wooley | for contributions to the design of integrated circuits for communications systems |
| 1983 | Kenneth Laker | for contributions to filter design and microcircuit implementation |
| 1984 | Adel S. Sedra | for contributions to the theory and design of active-RC and switched-capacitor filters, and to engineering education |
| 1985 | Rajinder Khosla | for contributions to solid-state imaging, and for leadership in microelectronics |
| 1985 | James Plummer | for contributions to understanding silicon fabrication processes, device physics, and high-voltage integrated circuits |
| 1986 | Hugo De Man | for contributions to simulation, analysis and optimization of devices, MOS circuits, and sampled data systems |
| 1986 | Richard Jaeger | for contributions to devices technology for high-performance analog and digital computer systems |
| 1986 | Yannis Tsividis | for contributions to the development of MOS analog integrated circuits |
| 1986 | Kensall Wise | for leadership in the field of integrated solid-state sensors and engineering education |
| 1987 | C. Andre T. Salama | for contributions to the development of power semiconductor devices and the design of integrated circuits |
| 1988 | Earl Swartzlander | for contributions to VLSI design of specialized signal processors |
| 1989 | Eric A. Vittoz | for contributions to the development of micropower integrated circuits |
| 1990 | Randy Geiger | for contributions to discrete and integrated analog circuit design |
| 1990 | Sung-Mo Kang | for technical contributions to and leadership in the development of computer-aided design of very-large-scale integrated (VLSI) circuits and systems |
| 1990 | Hans-Jorg Pfleiderer | for contributions to CCD circuit and filter design |
| 1991 | Gerald Borsuk | for technical leadership in solid-state and vacuum electronic devices and for contributions to the development of microelectronic photo detectors for optical signal processing |
| 1991 | Adrian Paul Brokaw | for innovations in analog circuit design |
| 1991 | Eliot D. Cohen | for leadership in the advancement of microwave and millimeter-wave monolithic integrated circuits |
| 1991 | David Kerns | for contributions to engineering education and research in microelectronics |
| 1991 | Nicky Lu | for contributions to semiconductor memory design and technology |
| 1991 | Kenneth W. Martin | for contribution to the mathematical theory of linear and nonlinear systems |
| 1991 | Allen Podell | for contributions to hybrid and gallium arsenide monolithic microwave integrated circuits |
| 1992 | Bryan Ackland | for contributions to the design of custom integrated circuits for signal processing systems |
| 1992 | Phillip Allen | for contributions to electrical engineering education and microelectronics textbooks |
| 1992 | David J. Allstot | for contributions to the analysis and design of switched-capacitor and analog integrated circuits |
| 1993 | Josef Nossek | for contributions to the design of discrete-time networks and technical leadership in the development of radio communication systems |
| 1994 | Ching-Te Chuang | for contributions to high-performance bipolar devices, circuits, and technology |
| 1994 | Giovanni De Micheli | for contribution to synthesis algorithms for the design of electronic circuits and systems |
| 1994 | Ronald Gutmann | for contributions in microwave semiconductor technology |
| 1994 | Richard Hester | for contributions to programmable single-chip data acquisition systems |
| 1994 | Martin Peckerar | for contributions to and leadership in X-ray and microlithography |
| 1994 | Tsutomu Sasao | for contributions to the design theory and techniques of combinational logic circuits |
| 1994 | Robert Swartz | for contributions to the design of high-speed integrated circuits for optical communication systems |
| 1995 | Bella Bose | for contributions to the theory and design of unidirectional codes |
| 1995 | Jose Huertas | for contributions to the synthesis and design of non-linear networks, especially in the case of chaotic, neural, and fuzzy networks |
| 1995 | Subramanian Iyer | for contributions to SiGe heterojunction devices and self-aligned silicides |
| 1995 | Chih-Yuan Lu | for contributions to semiconductor technology, and for leadership in the growth of the Taiwan integrated circuit industry |
| 1995 | Jan M. Rabaey | for contributions in design synthesis and concurrent architectures for signal processing applications |
| 1995 | Willy M. Sansen | for contributions to the systematic design of analog integrated circuits |
| 1995 | Charles Sodini | for contributions to the development of oversampled A/D converters, DRAM devices and circuits, and integrated circuits process technology |
| 1996 | Asad Abidi | for contributions to the design of high-frequency MOS analog integrated circuits |
| 1996 | Mau Chung Chang | for pioneering work in processing technology for manufacturing heterojunction bipolar integrated circuits |
| 1996 | Franco Maloberti | for contributions to design methodologies for analog integrated circuits and outstanding leadership in microelectronics education and research |
| 1996 | Vojin Oklobdzija | for contributions to computer architecture |
| 1996 | A Rodriguez-Vazquez | for contributions to the design and applications of analog/digital nonlinear ICs |
| 1996 | Bing Sheu | for contributions to signal processing and neural network systems using VLSI processors |
| 1996 | Mona Zaghloul | for leadership in education and research in integrated circuit design and their application to neural networks |
| 1997 | H. Clark Bell | for advancements in synthesis techniques and development of new prototype networks for microwave filters |
| 1997 | Larry Carley | for contributions to the design o analog integrated circuits and to computer-aided analog design |
| 1997 | José Epifânio da Franca | for contributions to analog MultiMate signal processing and engineering education |
| 1997 | Johan Huijsing | for contributions to the design and analysis of analog integrated circuits |
| 1997 | Mohammed Ismail | for contributions to analog VLSI circuits and signal processing |
| 1997 | Howard Kalter | for contributions to the development of DRAM |
| 1997 | Michitaka Kameyama | for contributions to the development of multiple-valued intelligent integrated systems |
| 1997 | Mitsumasa Koyanagi | for the invention of the stacked capacitor DRAM cell |
| 1997 | Hisham Massoud | for contributions the understanding of silicon oxidation kinetics, ultrathin gate dielectrics, and the Si-SiO2 interface |
| 1997 | Maciej Ogorzalek | for contributions to the theory, analysis, and control of nonlinear dynamic systems and chaotic phenomena |
| 1997 | Gabriel Rebeiz | for the development of novel microwave and millimeter-wave antennas, receivers and circuits using micromachining techniques |
| 1997 | Gerhard Sollner | for pioneering the development of resonant-tunneling structures and contributions to the understanding of high-speed semiconductor devices |
| 1998 | Young-Kai Chen | for contributions to ultra-short pulse generation using semiconductor lasers, integrated laser-modulators, and high frequency InPHBATs |
| 1998 | Tadayoshi Enomoto | for contributions to the development of integrated circuits multimedia |
| 1998 | Eric Fossum | for contributions to image sensors and on-chip image processing |
| 1998 | Barry Gilbert | for development of improved electronic packaging for high performance gallium arsenide integrated circuits |
| 1998 | Michael Kennedy | for contributions to the theory of neural networks and nonlinear dynamics, and for leadership in nonlinear circuits research and education |
| 1999 | Fazau Ali | for contributions to the design and development of monolithic microwave integrated circuits (MMICs) and providing leadership in commercial applications of the same |
| 1999 | Giorgio Baccarani | for contributions to the scaled silicon device theory |
| 1999 | Magdy Bayoumi | for contributions to application specific digital signal processing architectures and computer arithmetic |
| 1999 | Rinaldo Castello | for contributions to the design of integrated filters |
| 1999 | Heiner Ryssel | for introduction of ion implantation technology into the German Semiconductor Industry |
| 1999 | Bang-Sup Song | for contributions to integrated filters and analog-digital converters |
| 1999 | Ian Young | for contributions to microprocessor circuit implementation and technology development |
| 2000 | Peter Asbeck | for development of heterostructure bipolar transistors and applications |
| 2000 | Abbas El Gamal | for pioneering application of probability and statistics to develop new methods for the analysis and design of integrated circuits |
| 2000 | Manfred Glesner | for contributions to the development of microelectronic system design and education in microelectronics |
| 2000 | Ronald W. Knepper | for contributions to semiconductor device design, modeling, and circuits |
| 2000 | Khalil Najafi | for contributions to biomedical microelectromechanical systems technology |
| 2000 | Ronald Schrimpf | for contributions to the understanding and the modeling of physical mechanisms governing the response of semiconductor devices to radiation exposure |
| 2000 | Mani Soma | for contributions to mixed analog-digital system design-for-test |
| 2000 | Yuan-Chen Sun | for contributions to advanced CMOS technology |
| 2001 | John Corcoran | for contributions to high-performance analog-to-digital converters |
| 2001 | John Cressler | for contributions to the understanding and optimization of silicon and silicon-germanium bipolar transistors |
| 2001 | Geert De Veirman | for contributions to the design of continuous-time filters and hard-disk drive read channel ICs |
| 2001 | Sang Hoo Dhong | for contribution to high speed processor and memory chip design |
| 2001 | Yoshiaki Hagiwara | for pioneering work on, and development of, solid-state imagers |
| 2001 | Wei Hwang | for contributions to high density cell technology and high speed Dynamic Random Access Memory design |
| 2001 | David Johns | for contributions to the theory and design of analog adaptive integrated circuits used in digital communications |
| 2001 | Massoud Pedram | for contributions to the theory and practice of low-power design and CAD |
| 2001 | John Przybysz | for contributions in the development and application of Josephson digital circuits to electronic systems, especially radars, communication satellites and data switching networks |
| 2001 | Muhammad Rashid | for leadership in power electronics education and contributions to the analysis and design methodologies of solid-state power converters |
| 2001 | Ritu Shrivastava | for contributions to high performance CMOS memory technology and product development |
| 2002 | Mihai Banu | for contributions to the art of fully integrated continuous-time analog-filter design |
| 2002 | Joachim Burghartz | for contributions to integrated high-speed and radio-frequency silicon devices and components |
| 2002 | Georges Ge Gielen | for contributions to computer-aided design and design automation of analog and mixed-signal integrated circuits and systems |
| 2002 | James W. Haslett | for contributions to high temperature instrumentation and noise in solid-state electronics |
| 2002 | Rajiv Joshi | for contributions to chip metallurgy materials and processes, and high performance processor and circuit design |
| 2002 | Debajyoti Pal | for contributions to the theory and practice of the use of excess bandwidth and diversity in adaptive equalization for data transmission |
| 2002 | Lawrence Pileggi | for contributions to simulation and modeling of integrated circuits |
| 2002 | Carl Sechen | for contributions to automated placement and routing in integrated circuits |
| 2002 | Albert Theuwissen | for contributions to the development of CCD image sensors for still photography and HDTV applications |
| 2002 | Jan Van der Spiegel | for contributions in biologically motivated sensors and information processing systems |
| 2003 | Kinam Kim | for contributions the development of high-density dynamic random access memory |
| 2003 | Behzad Razavi | for contributions to high-speed communication circuits |
| 2003 | Mark Rodwell | for contributions to high speed electron devices and integrated circuits |
| 2003 | Alan Seabaugh | for contributions to high speed and nanoelectronic device and circuit technology |
| 2004 | Gary Bronner | for contributions to dynamic random access memory technology |
| 2004 | Anantha P. Chandrakasan | for contributions to the design of energy efficient integrated circuits and systems |
| 2004 | Hou Chaohuan | for technical leadership in advancing VLSI system technology |
| 2004 | Robert Eklund | for leadership in the development and manufacturing of sub-micron CMOS technologies |
| 2004 | Erik Heijne | for contributions to semiconductor detector systems and radiation tolerant detector readout electronics |
| 2004 | Robert Jackson | for contributions to the electromagnetic modeling of microwave integrated circuits and packaging |
| 2004 | Jean-Luc Leray | for contributions to the implementation of radiation hardened silicon-on-sapphire and silicon-on-insulator technologies |
| 2004 | Colin McAndrew | for contributions to compact and statistical modeling of semiconductor devices |
| 2004 | Mikael Ostling | for contributions to semiconductor device technology and education |
| 2004 | Gordon W. Roberts | for contributions to the design and test of analog and mixed-signal integrated circuits, and education |
| 2004 | Mohamad Sawan | for contributions to implantable medical devices |
| 2004 | David Scott | for contributions to CMOS and BICMOS technology and circuits |
| 2004 | Christer Svensson | for contributions to single phase clocking and high speed CMOS circuits |
| 2004 | Osamu Tomisawa | for contributions to low power, high speed integrated circuits |
| 2005 | Pemmaraju V. Ananda Mohan | for contributions to telecommunications technologies |
| 2005 | David Comer | for leadership in engineering education and publication of electronic circuit design textbooks |
| 2005 | Domine M.W. Leenaerts | for contributions to nonlinear circuit theory and design |
| 2005 | Lloyd Massengill | for contributions to radiation effects in microelectronics |
| 2005 | Kartikeya Mayaram | for contributions to coupled device and circuit simulation |
| 2005 | Laurence Nagel | for contributions to the field of integrated circuit simulation |
| 2005 | Donald Wunsch | for contributions to hardware implementations of reinforcement and unsupervised learning |
| 2005 | Kazuo Yano | for contributions to nanostructured-silicon devices and circuits and advanced CMOS logic |
| 2006 | Bhupendra Ahuja | for contributions to design of mixed signal complementary metal oxide semiconductor (CMOS) integrated circuits for telecommunications and computer communications systems |
| 2006 | Andreas Andreou | for contributions to energy efficient sensory microsystems |
| 2006 | James Barton | for contributions to the design of digital signal processing integrated circuits |
| 2006 | Hector De Los Santos | for contributions to radio frequency (RF) and microwave micro electromechanical systems (MEMS) devices and applications |
| 2006 | Paul Franzon | for contributions to chip-package codesign |
| 2006 | Tohru Furuyama | for contributions to high speed dynamic random access memory (DRAM) design and technologies |
| 2006 | Ramesh Harjani | for contributions to the design and computer aided design (CAD) of analog and radio frequency circuits |
| 2006 | William Krenik | for contributions to integrated circuits and technology for wireless products |
| 2006 | Tadahiro Kuroda | for contributions to low-power and high-speed very large scale integrated (VLSI) design |
| 2006 | Bin-Da Liu | for contributions to very large scaled integrated (VLSI) processors for neural networks and video signal processing |
| 2006 | Sitthichai Pokai-udom | for contributions to circuits and systems and engineering education |
| 2006 | Frederick Raab | for contributions to modeling and design of high-efficiency power amplifiers and radio transmitters |
| 2006 | Resve Saleh | for contributions to mixed-signal integrated circuit simulation and design verification |
| 2006 | Gianluca Setti | for contributions to application of nonlinear dynamics to communications, signal processing, and information technology |
| 2006 | Naresh Shanbhag | for development of a communication-centric design paradigm for low power systems on a chip |
| 2006 | Huei Wang | for contributions to broadband and millimeter-wave monolithic millimeter-wave integrated circuits (MMICs) and radio frequency integrated circuits (RFICs) |
| 2006 | Katsuyoshi Washio | for contributions to high-speed silicon and silicon germanium bipolar/Bi complementary metal oxide semiconductors (CMOS) device and circuit technologies |
| 2006 | Andreas Weisshaar | for contributions to modeling of on-chip interconnects and integrated passive microwave components |
| 2007 | Kerry Bernstein | for contributions to high performance common metal oxide semiconductor circuit design |
| 2007 | Yuhua Cheng | for contributions to metal-oxide-semiconductor field-effect transistor modeling and its industry applications in integrated circuit design |
| 2007 | Wanda Gass | for contributions to digital signal processors and circuits |
| 2007 | Stefan Heinen | for contributions to radio frequency integrated circuits and wireless systems |
| 2007 | Takayuki Kawahara | for contributions to low-voltage low-power random access memory circuits |
| 2007 | Bumman Kim | for contributions to linear power amplifiers, gallium arsenide microwave and millimeter-wave power devices and monolithic microwave integrated circuits |
| 2007 | Isik Kizilyalli | for contributions to integrated circuit technology |
| 2007 | Clark Tu-Cuong Nguyen | for contributions to the physics and technology of microelectromechanical systems |
| 2007 | Jayasimha Prasad | for contributions to compound semiconductor heterojunction bipolar transistors |
| 2007 | David Skellern | for contributions to high speed devices and systems for wireless and wireline communications networks |
| 2008 | Akintunde Akinwande | for contributions to the development of digital self-aligned gate technology and vacuum microelectronic devices |
| 2008 | Carlos Diaz | for contributions to deep sub-micron foundry CMOS technology |
| 2008 | Ming-Dou Ker | for contributions to electrostatic protection in integrated circuits, and performance optimization of VLSI micro-systems |
| 2008 | Rakesh Kumar | for entrepreneurial leadership in the field of integrated circuits |
| 2008 | Bram Nauta | for contributions to integrated analog circuit design |
| 2008 | Jyuo-Min Shyu | for leadership in the microelectronics industry |
| 2008 | Rui SilvaMartins | for leadership in engineering education |
| 2008 | Stewart Taylor | for contributions to analog, radio frequency and mixed-signal integrated circuit design |
| 2008 | Chorng-K Wang | for contributions to communications circuit design and for leadership in promoting the profession |
| 2008 | Hoi-Jun Yoo | for contributions to low-power and high-speed VLSI design |
| 2008 | Bin Zhao | for contributions to interconnect technology for integrated circuits |
| 2009 | Yves Baeyens | for contributions to the broadband and millimeter-wave circuits for optical and wireless communications |
| 2009 | Shekhar Borkar | for contributions to low power digital circuits in deep submicron technology |
| 2009 | Cor Claeys | for contributions to semiconductor device physics, defect engineering, and low frequency noise characterization |
| 2009 | Fa Dai | for contributions to high-speed frequency synthesis and radio frequency integrated circuits |
| 2009 | Gerhard Fettweis | for contributions to signal processing algorithms and chip implementation architectures for communications |
| 2009 | Tahir Ghani | for contributions to deep submicron metal oxide semiconductor transistor development for microprocessors |
| 2009 | Joseph Jensen | for contributions to high-speed analog-digital converter and high-speed digital integrated circuit design |
| 2009 | Shoji Kawahito | for contributions to sensor interfacing, sensor signal processing and multiple-level signaling |
| 2009 | Timothy Maloney | for contributions to electrostatic discharge protection of semiconductor components |
| 2009 | Un-Ku Moon | for contributions to low voltage complementary metal-oxide semiconductor mixed-signal technology |
| 2009 | Robert Staszewski | for contributions to development of digital radio frequency integrated systems |
| 2009 | Gregory Taylor | for contributions to mixed signal circuit technology for microprocessors |
| 2009 | Enrico Zanoni | for contributions to reliability of compound semiconductor devices |
| 2010 | Kazutami Arimoto | for development of high-density dynamic random access memory and embedded memory |
| 2010 | Baher Haroun | for development of submicron digital complementary metal-oxide semiconductor for wireless systems-on-chip |
| 2010 | Masashi Horiguchi | for contributions to circuit technologies for high-density low-power memories |
| 2010 | Bedrich Hosticka | for contributions to analog integrated circuits and sensor systems |
| 2010 | Takamaro Kikkawa | for contributions to interconnect technologies for integrated circuits |
| 2010 | Yusuf Leblebici | for contributions to reliability and design techniques for integrated circuits and systems |
| 2010 | Shen-Iuan Liu | for contributions to high-speed phase-locked and delay-locked loop circuit design |
| 2010 | Seth Sanders | for contributions to integrated passive component technology and digital control of power electronic systems |
| 2010 | Jose Silva | for contributions to Complimentary Metal-Oxide Semiconductor transconductance amplifiers and continuous-time filters |
| 2010 | Shumpei Yamazaki | for contributions to, and leadership in the industrialization of non-volatile memory and thin film transistor technologies |
| 2010 | Howard Yang | for leadership in mixed-signal integrated circuit design and manufacturing |
| 2010 | Zoran Zvonar | for leadership in the development of digital signal processing software and hardware for wireless cellular communication |
| 2011 | Arya Behzad | for contributions to analog and radio frequency integrated-circuits |
| 2011 | Gert Cauwenberghs | for contributions to integrated biomedical instrumentation |
| 2011 | Paul Davis | for development of bipolar integrated circuits |
| 2011 | Vivek De | for contributions to low power microprocessor design |
| 2011 | Ian Galton | for contributions to high-performance mixed-signal integrated circuits using digital calibration techniques |
| 2011 | Peter Kinget | for contributions to analog and radio frequency integrated circuits |
| 2011 | Ram Krishnamurthy | for contributions to high performance and low power digital circuits for microprocessors |
| 2011 | Kofi Makinwa | for the development of precision analog circuits and integrated sensor systems |
| 2011 | Kenneth O | for contributions to ultra-high frequency complementary metal-oxide semiconductor circuits |
| 2011 | Myung Hoon Sunwoo | for contributions to multimedia and communications |
| 2011 | Dennis Sylvester | for contributions to energy-efficient integrated circuits |
| 2011 | Kunio Uchiyama | for contributions to power-efficient microprocessors |
| 2011 | Chih-Kong Yang | for leadership in enhancement of input-output efficiency in integrated circuits |
| 2011 | Kevin Zhang | for contributions to service-oriented technologies and applications |
| 2011 | Herbert Zirath | for contributions to microwave and millimeter wave integrated circuits and device technology |
| 2012 | Robert Adams | for contributions to analog and digital signal processing |
| 2012 | Ahmad Bahai | for contributions to multi-carrier wireless and wire-line communication systems |
| 2012 | Douglas Garrity | for contributions to analog-to-digital converters for embedded applications |
| 2012 | Francis Kub | for leadership in the development of wide bandgap semiconductor power electronics |
| 2012 | Mike-Peng Li | for contributions to the design of jitter test technologies |
| 2012 | John Poulton | for contributions to high-speed low-power signaling and to graphics architecture |
| 2012 | Ken Poulton | for contributions to high-speed analog-to-digital conversion |
| 2012 | Manoj Sachdev | for contributions to test methodology for very large scale integrated circuits |
| 2013 | Ramachandra Achar | for contributions to interconnect and signal integrity analysis in high-speed designs |
| 2013 | Russel Baker | for contributions to the design of memory integrated circuits |
| 2013 | John Barth | for contributions to design and development of embedded dynamic random access memory |
| 2013 | Tzi-Dar Chiueh | for contributions to baseband processing integrated circuits for communications systems |
| 2013 | Marco Corsi | for development of high-speed amplifiers and analog to-digital convertors |
| 2013 | Kenneth Hansen | for technical leadership in wireless communications |
| 2013 | Kevin Kobayashi | for contributions to monolithic microwave integrated circuits (MMIC) |
| 2013 | Kadaba Lakshmikumar | for contributions to design of mixed signal CMOS integrated circuits for telecommunications |
| 2013 | Yan-Fei Liu | for contributions to digital control techniques of power electronics converters |
| 2013 | Cian Mathuna | for leadership in the development of power supply using micromagnetics on silicon |
| 2013 | Subhasish Mitra | for contributions to design and test of robust integrated circuits |
| 2013 | Arthur Morris | for development and commercialization of CMOS radio frequency micro electro mechanical systems |
| 2013 | Ingrid Verbauwhede | for contributions to design of secure integrated circuits and systems |
| 2014 | Krste Asanovic | for contributions to computer architecture |
| 2014 | Poras Balsara | for contributions to the design of all-digital frequency synthesis |
| 2014 | Andrea Baschirotto | for contributions to analog filters |
| 2014 | Richard Brown | for contributions to microsystem design |
| 2014 | Klaas Bult | for contributions to the design of high frequency analog and mixed signal circuits |
| 2014 | Jan Craninckx | for contributions to the design of CMOS RF transceivers |
| 2014 | Hooman Darabi | for contributions to radio frequency integrated circuits and systems |
| 2014 | Tobias Delbruck | for contributions to neuromorphic visual sensors and processing |
| 2014 | Ichiro Fujimori | for contributions to oversampled data converters and gigabit wireline transceivers |
| 2014 | Kazunari Ishimaru | for contributions to static random access memory and complementary metal-oxide semiconductor devices |
| 2014 | Xicheng Jiang | for development of communication systems-on-chip products |
| 2014 | Tanay Karnik | for contributions to error-tolerant circuits and near-load voltage regulators |
| 2014 | Howard Luong | for contributions to CMOS radio-frequency transceiver design |
| 2014 | Philip Mok | for contributions to the design of analog power-management integrated circuits |
| 2014 | Sam Naffziger | for leadership in the development of power management and low power processor technologies |
| 2014 | Zhigang Pan | for contributions to design for manufacturability in integrated circuits |
| 2014 | Daniel Radack | for leadership in microwave and millimeter-wave integrated circuit technologies and packaging techniques |
| 2014 | William Redman-White | for contributions to chip design aspects of telecommunications systems and RFIC design |
| 2014 | Toru Shimizu | for development of integrated multi-core microprocessors with large memories |
| 2014 | Mircea Stan | for contributions to power- and temperature-aware design of VLSI circuits and systems |
| 2014 | Jacobus Swart | for contributions to microelectronics education in Brazil |
| 2015 | Joseph Cavallaro | for contributions to VLSI architectures and algorithms for signal processing and wireless communications |
| 2015 | Michael Flynn | for contributions to integrated analog-digital interfaces |
| 2015 | Giuseppe Iannaccone | for contributions to modeling transport and noise processes in nanoelectronic devices |
| 2015 | Thomas Lee | for contributions to the design of CMOS radio-frequency integrated circuits |
| 2015 | Boris Murmann | for contributions to the design of digitally-assisted analog integrated circuits |
| 2015 | Richard Schreier | for contributions to delta-sigma data converters |
| 2015 | An-Yeu (Andy) Wu | for contributions to DSP algorithms and VLSI designs for communication IC/SoC |
| 2015 | Yuan Xie | for contributions to design automation and architecture of three-dimensional integrated circuits |
| 2015 | Chik Patrick Yue | for contributions to the advancement of CMOS radio-frequency integrated circuits and devices modeling |
| 2016 | Massimo Alioto | for contributions to energy-efficient VLSI circuits |
| 2016 | Eugenio Cantatore | for contributions to the design of circuits with organic thin film transistors |
| 2016 | Degang Chen | for contributions to testing of analog and mixed-signal integrated circuits |
| 2016 | Gyu-Hyeong Cho | for contributions to power management circuit design |
| 2016 | Terry Cisco | for leadership in the development of airborne active array transmit and receive module technologies |
| 2016 | Patrick Fay | for contributions to compound semiconductor tunneling and high-speed device technologies |
| 2016 | Tzyy-Sheng Horng | for contributions to system-in-package modeling and design |
| 2016 | Lawrence Kushner | for leadership in RF/microwave circuits for military and commercial applications |
| 2016 | Gabriele Manganaro | for leadership in the design of high-speed converters |
| 2016 | Kenichi Osada | for contributions to reliable and low-power nanoscale SRAM |
| 2016 | Mehmet Soyuer | for contributions to the design of high-frequency integrated circuits for clocking and communications |
| 2016 | Toru Tanzawa | for contributions to integrated high-voltage circuits |
| 2016 | Seng-Pan U | for leadership in the analog circuit design |
| 2017 | Hugh Barnaby | for research of radiation effects in bipolar junction transistors |
| 2017 | Yu Cao | for development of predictive technology models for reliable circuit and system integration |
| 2017 | Edoardo Charbon | for contributions to solid-state single photon avalanche detectors and their applications in imaging |
| 2017 | Payam Heydari | for contributions to silicon-based millimeter-wave integrated circuits and systems |
| 2017 | Hideto Hidaka | for leadership in high-density memory technologies for automotive applications |
| 2017 | Ru Huang | for contributions to multi-gate silicon nanowire transistor technology |
| 2017 | Kenji Itoh | for contributions to microwave harmonic mixers and applications to mobile terminal devices |
| 2017 | Deog-Kyoon Jeong | for development of Digital Video Interface and High Definition Multimedia Interface standards |
| 2017 | Donald Lie | for contributions to high linearity and high efficiency silicon RF power amplifiers for broadband wireless applications |
| 2017 | Cyril Luxey | for the development of small antennas, multi-antenna system integration, and high performance mm-wave systems |
| 2017 | Junichi Nakamura | for leadership in CMOS image sensors |
| 2017 | Borivoje Nikolic | for contributions to energy-efficient design of digital and mixed-signal circuits |
| 2017 | Carlo Samori | for contributions to design of integrated Voltage Controlled Oscillators and Phase-Locked Loops |
| 2017 | Andrei Vladimirescu | for contributions to the development and commercial adoption of SPICE circuit simulation |
| 2017 | Sorin P. Voinigescu | for contributions to silicon and silicon-germanium microwave and millimeter-wave devices and integrated circuits |
| 2017 | Zhihua Wang | for contributions to circuits and microsystems for medical applications |
| 2018 | Pamela Ann Abshire | for contributions to CMOS biosensors |
| 2018 | Kun-Yung Chang | for contributions to transceivers for high-performance networking and high-density memories |
| 2018 | Tsung-Yung Chang | for application of SRAM technology to low-power and high-performance computing |
| 2018 | Andreas Demosthenous | for contributions to integrated circuits for active medical devices |
| 2018 | Isaac Lagnado | for leadership in the development of silicon-on-sapphire technology |
| 2018 | Chee Wee Liu | for contributions to high-mobility Ge and SiGe MOSFETs |
| 2018 | Sanu Mathew | for leadership in computer arithmetic datapath and security circuits |
| 2018 | Saibal Mukhopadhyay | for contributions to energy-efficient and robust computing systems design |
| 2018 | Hidetoshi Onodera | for contributions to variation-aware design and analysis of integrated circuits |
| 2018 | Shanthi Pavan | for contributions to delta sigma modulators, and analog filters |
| 2019 | Meng-Fan Chang | for contributions to static and nonvolatile memories for embedded systems |
| 2019 | Christian Enz | for contributions to low-power analog circuit design |
| 2019 | Maysam Ghovanloo | for contributions to implantable wireless integrated circuits and systems |
| 2019 | Ali Khakifirooz | for contributions to fully depleted silicon-on-insulator complementary-metal-oxide-semiconductor technology |
| 2019 | Lee-Sup Kim | for contributions to energy-efficient multimedia processor architectures |
| 2019 | Pui-In Mak | for contributions to radio-frequency and analog circuits |
| 2019 | Katsu Nakamura | for contributions to integrated circuits for digital imaging |
| 2019 | Samar Saha | for contributions to compact modeling of silicon field-effect transistors |
| 2019 | Munehiro Tada | for contributions to copper interconnects for very-large-scale integration |
| 2019 | ShaoJun Wei | for leadership in integrated circuits engineering of smart cards and reconfigurable devices |
| 2019 | Jared Zerbe | for contributions to the development of high performance serial interfaces |
| 2019 | Lin Zhong | for contributions to the development of energy-efficient driver circuits for organic light-emitting diodes |
| 2020 | William Bidermann | for leadership in commercially successful image sensors and microprocessors |
| 2020 | Ramon Carvajal | for contributions to low-voltage and low-power CMOS analog circuit design |
| 2020 | Pavan Kumar Hanumolu | for contributions to the design of mixed-signal integrated circuits |
| 2020 | Yiannos Manoli | for contributions to the design of integrated analog-to-digital interface circuits and energy harvesting systems |
| 2020 | Bich-Yen Nguyen | for contributions to silicon on insulator technology |
| 2020 | Jae-Sung Rieh | for contributions to silicon-germanium integrated circuits for wireless communications |
| 2020 | Manfred Schindler | for development in microwave switch technology for radar and wireless communication systems |
| 2020 | Ravi Todi | for contributions to innovative design and commercialization of high performance eDRAM |
| 2020 | Masoud Zargari | for contributions to the development of CMOS radio-frequency integrated circuits |
| 2021 | Ahmed Ali | for leadership in high-speed analog-to-digital converter design and calibration |
| 2021 | Benton Calhoun | for contributions to sub-threshold integrated circuits and self-powered systems |
| 2021 | Yogesh Chauhan | for contributions to compact modeling of Si and GaN transistors |
| 2021 | Robert Henderson | for contributions to solid-state single photon imaging |
| 2021 | Inyup Kang | for leadership in development of chip-set technologies for cellular communications |
| 2021 | Ali Keshavarzi | for contributions to low-power circuits and devices in scaled CMOS technologies |
| 2021 | Dejan Markovic | for contributions to low-power VLSI signal processing and neurotechnology |
| 2021 | Jun Ohta | for contributions to CMOS image sensors and devices for biomedical applications |
| 2022 | James Buckwalter | for contributions to high-efficiency millimeter-wave power amplifiers and optical transceivers in SOI technologies |
| 2022 | Baoxing Chen | for contributions to integrated signal-power isolation and integrated magnetics |
| 2022 | Thomas Byunghak Cho | for leadership and contributions in CMOS RFIC design and commercialization of wireless mobile systems |
| 2022 | Daniel Friedman | for contributions to RFID and phase-lock-loop systems |
| 2022 | Ioannis Kymissis | for contributions to thin-film electronics for displays and sensors |
| 2022 | Shih-Chii Liu | for contributions to neuromorphic engineering |
| 2022 | Hiroyuki Mizuno | for contributions to leakage current reduction in integrated circuits |
| 2022 | Masato Motomura | for contributions to memory-logic integration of reconfigurable chip architecture |
| 2022 | Carl Zetterling | for contributions to silicon carbide devices |
| 2022 | Anding Zhu | for contributions to behavioral modeling and digital predistortion of RF power amplifiers |
| 2023 | Walid Ali-Ahmad | for leadership in development of low-cost direct-conversion cellular RF systems |
| 2023 | Keith Bowman | for contributions to variation-tolerant adaptive processor designs |
| 2023 | Donhee Ham | for contributions to semiconductor electronic interfaces with biological systems |
| 2023 | Muhammad Khellah | for contributions to co-optimization of on-die dense memory and fine-grain power-management circuits |
| 2023 | Thomas Mikolajick | for contributions to nonvolatile memory |
| 2023 | Kenichi Okada | for contributions to millimeter-wave communication circuits design |
| 2023 | Omer Oralkan | for contributions to micromachined ultrasonic transducers and integrated microsystems development, for imaging, therapy, and sensing |
| 2023 | Woogeun Rhee | for contributions to phase-locked circuits and systems |
| 2023 | Hua Wang | for contributions to high-efficiency microwave and millimeter-wave power amplifiers |
| 2023 | Qiangfei Xia | for contributions to resistive memory arrays and devices for in-memory computing |
| 2024 | Joseph Bardin | for contributions to cryogenic microwave circuits |
| 2024 | Ke-Horng Chen | for contributions to power management integrated circuits and system design |
| 2024 | Shuo-Wei Chen | for contributions to data converter architectures and clock generation techniques |
| 2024 | SeongHwan Cho | for contributions to time-domain circuits and applications |
| 2024 | Sergiu Goma | for contributions to hardware implementation of image processing for color cameras in mobile phones |
| 2024 | Deukhyoun Heo | for contributions to CMOS power amplifiers in multi-layer packages and reconfigurable reactive components |
| 2024 | Kaixue Ma | for contributions to low-loss substrate integrated suspended line technology and reconfigurable millimeter-wave front-end integrated circuits |
| 2024 | Osama Shana'a | for leadership in developing low-cost high-performance RF transreceivers |
| 2026 | Farhana Sheikh | For contributions to digital signal processing and 2.5D/3D heterogeneous integration |

== See also ==
- List of IEEE Fellows
