= Balsara =

Balsara is an Indian surname (Parsi/Hindu), similar to Bulsara, which indicates ancestry from Bulsar (Valsad). Notable people with the surname include:

- Bhicaji Balsara, first Indian to be naturalised as a U.S. citizen
- Christina Balsara, married name of Christina Stone, Singaporean model and businesswoman
- Farrokh Bulsara, birth name of Freddie Mercury, British Indian entertainer and leader of Queen
- Poras Balsara, American engineer
- Sam Balsara, Indian advertising executive
