= Bulsara =

Bulsara is an Indian (Parsi/Hindu) surname, similar to Balsara, which indicates ancestry from Bulsar (Valsad) in Gujarat. Notable people with this surname include.

- Adi Bulsara (born 1951), Indian physicist
- Barry George (also known as Barry Bulsara, born 1960), English murder suspect
- Baol Bardot Bulsara, vocalist for TNT (Norwegian band)
- Brigadier Farouk Bulsara, Indian Army officer; leader of Operation Cactus, India's first overseas rescue mission, against the 1988 Maldives coup attempt
- Freddie Mercury (born Farrokh Bulsara, 1946–1991), British Indian musician born in Zanzibar
- Ketan Ramanlal Bulsara, Indian-American neurosurgeon
- Nina Bulsara, fictional character from Doctors (2000 TV series) played by Wendi Peters
- Nirupa Roy (born Kokila Kishorechandra Bulsara, 1931–2004), Indian actress
- Suni Bulsara, fictional character from Doctors (2000 TV series) played by Rahul Arya

== Other uses ==
- Bulsara (crater), a crater on Mercury
