= William A. Gardner =

William A Gardner
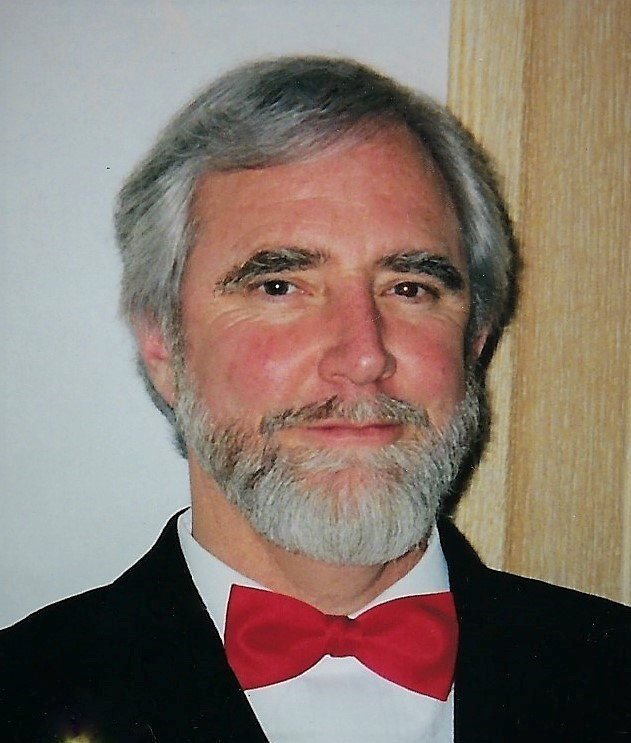
- Born: Allen William McLean; November 4, 1942 (age 83); Palo Alto, California

Academic background
- Education: M.S. and Ph.D. in Electrical Engineering
- Alma mater: Stanford University and University of Massachusetts, Amherst

Academic work
- Institutions: University of California, Davis
- Doctoral students: Earl McCune
- Notable works: Statistical Spectral Analysis: A Non-Probabilistic Theory (1987); Introduction to Random Processes (1985, 1990)

William A. Gardner (born Allen William McLean, November 4, 1942) is an American electrical engineer and professor emeritus at the University of California, Davis, known for his foundational contributions to the statistical theory of cyclostationarity and time-series analysis.Gardner has authored four books on statistical signal processing theory. His 1987 book Statistical Spectral Analysis: A Nonprobabilistic Theory has been cited over 1,200 times in peer-reviewed journals.His research papers and books have been cited in over seventeen thousand peer-reviewed journal articles.

He is also an entrepreneur and founder of the R&D firm Statistical Signal Processing, Inc. (SSPI), which he led as president, CEO, and chief scientist for 25 years (1986–2011) before its IP was acquired by Lockheed Martin.

According to a peer-reviewed tutorial published in Mechanical Systems and Signal Processing (Antoni, 2009), Gardner "first established many of the theoretical foundations [of cyclostationarity], laid down the currently used terminology, and also foresaw many applications."

== Biography ==
=== Early life ===
Gardner's interest in serious study and academia did not emerge until after completing his military service in 1961. He began studies at Foothill Junior College in Los Altos Hills, California in 1962, transferred to Stanford University in 1964, and received an M.S. degree in Electrical Engineering in 1967.

=== Academic Career ===
Gardner married Nancy Susan Lenhart in June 1966. Upon receiving his M.S. degree from Stanford University in 1967, he was employed as a member of technical staff at Bell Telephone Laboratories from 1967 to 1969, attending the Massachusetts Institute of Technology during this period. He completed his Ph.D. in electrical engineering from the University of Massachusetts in 1972 under the supervision of Lewis E. Franks, and joined the University of California, Davis as an assistant professor the same year. Gardner performed research and teaching at UC Davis for nearly 30 years, advancing to Professor VII and then becoming professor emeritus in 2001. In 2024, he returned to academia, accepting the position of Research Professor in the Department of Electrical and Computer Engineering at the University of California, Davis.

== Research ==
After completing his dissertation "Representation and Estimation of Cyclostationary Processes" in 1972, Gardner began developing a comprehensive theory for cyclostationary and almost cyclostationary processes.

In 1985, he published Introduction to Random Processes with Applications to Signals and Systems, which examined the duality between stochastic and nonstochastic theories of time-series analysis.His 1987 book Statistical Spectral Analysis: A Non-probabilistic Theory introduced his Fraction-of-Time (FOT) probability theory. Independent reviewers included Akiva Yaglom, who noted it was the first work "to present the modern spectral analysis of random processes consistently in language that uses only time-averaging rather than averaging over the statistical ensemble.In 1987, Gardner was invited by the editor of IEEE Signal Processing Magazine to write an introduction to the 1914 contribution of Albert Einstein to time-series analysis.

Gardner received the Stephen O. Rice Prize Paper Award in Communication Theory from the IEEE Communications Society in 1988 for the paper "Signal Interception: A Unifying Theoretical Framework for Feature Detection" (IEEE Transactions on Communications, Vol. COM-36, No. 8, pp. 897–906).

He also received the EURASIP Best Paper of the Year Award in 1986 for "The Spectral Correlation Theory of Cyclostationary Time-Series" (Signal Processing, Vol. 11, pp. 13–36).

Together with doctoral student Chi Kang Chen, Gardner co-authored The Random Processes Tutor (1989). With doctoral student Chad Spooner, he extended his theory to higher-order cyclostationarity in the early 1990s.

Gardner edited and contributed to Cyclostationarity in Communications and Signal Processing (IEEE Press, 1994), which grew from the first National Workshop on Cyclostationary Signals in 1992, jointly funded by the National Science Foundation and the US Army, Navy, and Air Force research offices.

His 2006 review paper "Cyclostationarity: Half a Century of Research" (Signal Processing, Vol. 86, pp. 639–697), co-authored with A. Napolitano and L. Paura, received the Elsevier Most Cited Paper Award for the period 2005–2007.

Gardner's contributions to cyclostationarity are documented comprehensively in Antonio Napolitano's Cyclostationary Processes and Time Series (Elsevier, 2019), where Gardner's work is cited over 500 times.

In 2016, Gardner developed a method for converting irregular cyclostationarity into regular cyclostationarity, extending the tools of cyclostationary signal processing to natural data with irregular cyclicity. Gardner also maintains www.cyclostationarity.com, an extensive research website managed in perpetuity by the College of Engineering, University of California, Davis. Completed after nine years of work, the website serves as a comprehensive state-of-the-art reference on cyclostationarity, integrating links to key research papers and books through narrative discussion. This book was an outgrowth of the first National Workshop on Cyclostationary Signals in 1992, which was funded jointly by the National Science Foundation and the Offices of Research of the US Army, Navy, and Air Force. Gardner served, by invitation of the NSF, as organizer and chair.

== Entrepreneurship ==
In 1982, Gardner founded Statistical Signal Processing, Inc. (SSPI), an engineering research services company serving the national security sector and cellular RF communications industry. He served as president, CEO, and chief scientist for 25 years until the company's IP was sold to Lockheed Martin in 2011. In 2001, Gardner founded Gardner Technologies, Inc., serving as president and chief technology officer until 2006. During this period he also pursued a cellular-telephone-technology venture, PureWave Technologies, in partnership with his previous PhD student Stephen Schell, with the resulting IP later sold to Apple Inc. Gardner Technologies also developed patented wine-packaging innovations under the brand MetaCork/IC3, for which Gardner received the International DuPont Award for Innovation in Food Packaging Technology and the Frost & Sullivan Award for Consumer-Product-Design Excellence-in-Technology, both in 2005.

== Recent Research ==
In 2022, Gardner co-authored with Antonio Napolitano "Fraction-of-Time Probability: Advancing Beyond the Need for Stationarity and Ergodicity Assumptions" (IEEE Access, vol. 10, pp. 34591–34612). In 2023, he published "Transitioning Away from Stochastic Process Models" (Journal of Sound and Vibration, Vol. 565). In 2025, he published "A Radically Different Method of Moments" and, co-authored with Napolitano, "Discovering and Modeling Hidden Periodicities in Science Data" in EURASIP Journal on Advances in Signal Processing In 2026, he published "On Cycloergodicity" (Signal Processing, Vol. 238) and "Generalized Wiener Filtering for Time-Variant Linearly Transformed Signals in Noise" (Signal Processing, in press).

== Awards and honors ==
- 1986 – International Best Paper of the Year Award, EURASIP, for "The Spectral Correlation Theory of Cyclostationary Time-Series"
- 1987 – Distinguished Engineering Alumnus Award, University of Massachusetts
- 1988 – Stephen O. Rice Prize Paper Award in Communication Theory, IEEE Communications Society
- 1991 – Fellow, Institute of Electrical and Electronics Engineers, "For contributions to the development of time-series analysis and stochastic processes with applications to statistical signal processing and communication, and for contributions to engineering education"
- 2005 – International DuPont Award for Innovation in Food Packaging Technology
- 2005 – Frost & Sullivan Annual Award for Consumer-Product-Design Excellence-in-Technology
- 2008 – Most Cited Paper Award for the period 2005–2007, Elsevier

== Books ==
- Introduction to Random Processes with Applications to Signals and Systems (Macmillan, 1985; 2nd ed. McGraw-Hill, 1990)
- Statistical Spectral Analysis: A Non-Probabilistic Theory (Prentice-Hall, 1987)
- The Random Process Tutor: A Comprehensive Solutions Manual for Independent Study (with C. K. Chen, McGraw-Hill, 1990; re-release with errata, 2014)
- Cyclostationarity in Communications and Signal Processing (Editor and Contributor, IEEE Press, 1994)
