= Wai-Kai Chen =

Chinese-American professor emeritus

- Born: December 23, 1936 (age 89); Nanjing, China
- Occupations: Electrical engineer; academic
- Awards: Lester R. Ford Award (1967)

Academic background
- Education: Ohio University (BS, MS); University of Illinois Urbana-Champaign (PhD)

Wai-Kai Chen (Chinese: 陳 惠開; born December 23, 1936, in Nanjing) is a Chinese-American professor emeritus of electrical engineering and computer science.

== Biography ==
Wai-Kai Chen's youth was troubled by the Second Sino-Japanese War followed by the Chinese Civil War between the Nationalist Kuomintang Party and Chinese Communist Party. Born into an intellectual family, he had a twin brother Wai-Fah, an older brother Hollis, an older sister Eileen, a younger sister Helena, and a younger brother Wai-Sun. The family was on the Nationalist side. In 1949 Wai-Kai Chen's maiden aunt went with Wai-Sun and Helena went to Taiwan. Some time later, Wai-Kai, Wai-Fah, and Hollis made a harrowing and adventurous escape to Taiwan. In Taipei, Wai-Kai and Wai-Fah entered formal education as sophomores in the Junior High School of Taiwan Normal University. In the 1950s Wai-Kai Chen went to the United States to study electrical engineering. In September 1962 in White Plains, New York, he married Shirley Chen (the sister of his friend Stanley S. Chen).

Wei-Kai Chen graduated in electrical engineering from Ohio University with a B.S. in 1960 and an M.S. in 1961 and from the University of Illinois Urbana-Champaign with a Ph.D. in 1964. From 1964 to 1981 he was a faculty member in the department of electrical engineering of Ohio University. From 1981 to 2001 he was a full professor and head of the department of electrical engineering and computer science at the University of Illinois Chicago. For the academic year 1970–1971 he was a visiting associate profess at Purdue University. For the first semester of the academic year 1979–1980 he was visiting professor at the University of Hawaiʻi at Mānoa. For the academic year 1986–1987 he held a visiting position at Chuo University, where he worked with Maskazu Sengoku and Shoji Shinoda. He has served as the editor-in-chief of the IEEE Transactions on Circuits and Systems I: Regular Papers and of the IEEE Transactions on Circuits and Systems II: Express Briefs, the president of the IEEE Circuits and Systems Society, and the founding editor-in-chief of the Journal of Circuits, Systems and Computers.

Chen is the author or editor of more than 30 books and the author or co-author of more than 280 technical articles. He was the co-author with John Choma (1941–2014) of Feedback Networks, published in 2007 by World Scientific. Chen has given more than 70 presentations at national or international conferences. He has done research on "VLSI circuits, broadband matching, active networks, filters, and applied graph theory especially its applications to parallel computations."

He received in 1967 the Lester R. Ford Award for his article Boolean Matrices and Switching Nets. He was elected in 1977 a fellow of the IEEE Circuits and Systems Society and in 1978 a fellow of the American Association for the Advancement of Science.

Among his books that are widely known among electrical engineers are: Applied Graph Theory, Theory and Design of Broadband Matching Networks, Active Network and Feedback Amplifier Theory, Linear Networks and Systems, Passive and Active Filters: Theory and Implements, Theory of Nets: Flows in Networks, The Circuits and Filters Handbook (3rd edition), The VLSI Handbook (2nd edition), and The Electrical Engineering Handbook.

== Selected publications ==
=== Articles ===
- Chen, Wai-Kai (1964). "The Inversion of Matrices by Flow Graphs". Journal of the Society for Industrial and Applied Mathematics. 12 (3): 676–685. doi:10.1137/0112058.
- —— (1965). "On the Modifications of Flow Graphs". Journal of the Society for Industrial and Applied Mathematics. 13 (2): 493–505. doi:10.1137/0113031.
- —— (1966). "On Directed Trees and Directed k-Trees of a Digraph and their Generation". SIAM Journal on Applied Mathematics. 14 (3): 550–560. doi:10.1137/0114048.
- —— (1967). "On Directed Graph Solutions of Linear Algebraic Equations". SIAM Review. 9 (4): 692–707. Bibcode:1967SIAMR...9..692C. doi:10.1137/1009110.
- —— (1969). "Unified theory on the generation of trees of a graph Part I. The Wang algebra formulation". International Journal of Electronics. 27 (2): 101–117. doi:10.1080/00207216908900016. (See Wang algebra.)
- —— (1969). "Unified theory on the generation of trees of a graph Part II. The matrix formulation". International Journal of Electronics. 27 (4): 319–336. doi:10.1080/00207216908900046.
- —— (1970). "On the nonsingular submatrices of the incidence matrix of a graph over the real field". Journal of the Franklin Institute. 289 (2): 155–166. doi:10.1016/0016-0032(70)90301-7.
- —— (1971). "Algebraic theory of dimensional analysis". Journal of the Franklin Institute. 292 (6): 403–422. doi:10.1016/0016-0032(71)90161-X.
- ——; Goyal, I. (1971). "Tables of essential complementary partitions". IEEE Transactions on Circuit Theory. 18 (5): 562–563. doi:10.1109/TCT.1971.1083334.
- ——; Fred Chan (1974). "On the unique solvability of linear active networks". IEEE Transactions on Circuits and Systems. 21: 26–35. doi:10.1109/TCS.1974.1083801.
- —— (1975). "Relationships between scattering matrix and other matrix representations of linear two-port networks". International Journal of Electronics. 38 (4): 433–441. doi:10.1080/00207217508920417.
- ——; Chaisrakeo, T. (1980). "Explicit formulas for the synthesis of optimum bandpass Butterworth and Chebyshev impedance-matching networks". IEEE Transactions on Circuits and Systems. 27 (10): 928–942. doi:10.1109/TCS.1980.1084734. (See Butterworth filter and Chebyshev filter.)
- —— (1980). "Unified theory of broadband matching". Journal of the Franklin Institute. 310 (6): 287–301. doi:10.1016/0016-0032(80)90008-3.
- Zhu, Yi-Sheng; —— (1985). "Realizability of lossless reciprocal and nonreciprocal broadband matching networks". Journal of the Franklin Institute. 319 (3): 325–340. doi:10.1016/0016-0032(85)90054-7. 1985
- Liang, Wen-Hai; ——; Gao, Shun-Quan (1990). "Applications of lattice theory to graph decomposition". Circuits, Systems and Signal Processing. 9 (2): 181–195. Bibcode:1990CSSP....9..181L. doi:10.1007/BF01236451. S2CID 123663701.
- Xin-Yu Wu; You-Shen Xia; Jianmin Li; —— (1996). "A high-performance neural network for solving linear and quadratic programming problems". IEEE Transactions on Neural Networks. 7 (3): 643–651. doi:10.1109/72.501722. PMID 18263461.
- Zha, Qiang-Zhong; —— (1997). "Transmission zeros and the two-port parameters". Journal of the Franklin Institute. 334 (4): 599–609. doi:10.1016/S0016-0032(96)00098-1.

=== Books ===
as author:

- Applied Graph Theory. North-Holland. 2 December 2012. ISBN 9780444601933. (1st edition 1971)
- Theory and Design of Broadband Matching Networks: Applied Electricity and Electronics. Elsevier. 22 October 2013. ISBN 9781483159447. (1st edition, 1976)
- Linear Networks and Systems: Algorithms and Computer-aided Implementations (In 2 Volumes) (2nd ed.). World Scientific. March 1990. ISBN 9789814520027. (1st edition, Brooks/Cole Engineering Division, 1983)
- Chen, Wai-kai (30 March 1991). Active Network Analysis (1st ed.). World Scientific Publishing Company. ISBN 9789813103764.
  - Active Network Analysis: Feedback Amplifier Theory (2nd ed.). World Scientific. 27 September 2016. ISBN 9789814675901.
- Chen, Wai-Kai (1997). Graph Theory and Its Engineering Applications. World Scientific. ISBN 9789810218591.
- Net Theory and Its Applications: Flows in Networks. World Scientific. 22 May 2003. ISBN 9781783261727.

as editor-in-chief:

- The VLSI Handbook (2nd ed.). CRC Press. 3 October 2018. ISBN 9781420005967. (1st edition, 1985)
- Passive, Active, and Digital Filters (3rd ed.). CRC Press. 8 October 2018. ISBN 9781420058864. (1st edition, 1986)
- The Circuits and Filters Handbook. CRC Press. 23 December 2002. ISBN 9781420041408. (1st edition, 1995)
  - The Circuits and Filters Handbook (Five Volume Slipcase Set) (3rd ed.). CRC Press. 14 December 2018. ISBN 9781000006575.
- Mathematics for circuits and filters. Boca Raton, Fla.: CRC Press. 2000. ISBN 9780849300523.
- Design automation, languages, and simulations. Boca Raton, Florida: CRC Press. 2003. ISBN 9780203009284.
- Logic design. Boca Raton, Fla.: CRC Press. 2003. ISBN 9780203010150.
- Memory, microprocessor, and ASIC. Boca Raton, Fla.: CRC Press. 2003. ISBN 9780203010235.
- Chen, Wai Kai (16 November 2004). The Electrical Engineering Handbook. ISBN 9780080477480.
- Nonlinear and Distributed Circuits. CRC Press. 8 October 2018. ISBN 9781420037081. (1st edition, 2006)
- Chen, Wai-Kai (8 October 2018). Analog and VLSI Circuits (3rd ed.). ISBN 9781351835015. (1st edition, 2009)
- Feedback, Nonlinear, and Distributed Circuits. CRC Press. 8 October 2018. ISBN 9781351835053. (1st edition, 2009)
