= Wang algebra =

Algebraic structure in network theory

In algebra and network theory, a Wang algebra is a commutative algebra $A$, over a field or (more generally) a commutative unital ring, in which $A$ has two additional properties:
(Rule i) For all elements x of $A$, x + x = 0 (universal additive nilpotency of degree 1).
(Rule ii) For all elements x of $A$, x⋅x = 0 (universal multiplicative nilpotency of degree 1).

== History and applications ==
Rules (i) and (ii) were originally published by K. T. Wang (Wang Ki-Tung, 王 季同) in 1934 as part of a method for analyzing electrical networks. From 1935 to 1940, several Chinese electrical engineering researchers published papers on the method. The original Wang algebra is the Grassmann algebra over the finite field mod 2. At the 57th annual meeting of the American Mathematical Society, held on December 27–29, 1950, Raoul Bott and Richard Duffin introduced the concept of a Wang algebra in their abstract (number 144t) The Wang algebra of networks. They gave an interpretation of the Wang algebra as a particular type of Grassmann algebra mod 2. In 1969 Wai-Kai Chen used the Wang algebra formulation to give a unification of several different techniques for generating the trees of a graph. The Wang algebra formulation has been used to systematically generate King-Altman directed graph patterns. Such patterns are useful in deriving rate equations in the theory of enzyme kinetics.

According to Guo Jinhai, professor in the Institute for the History of Natural Sciences of the Chinese Academy of Sciences, Wang Ki Tung's pioneering method of analyzing electrical networks significantly promoted electrical engineering not only in China but in the rest of the world; the Wang algebra formulation is useful in electrical networks for solving problems involving topological methods, graph theory, and Hamiltonian cycles.

== Wang Algebra and the Spanning Trees of a Graph ==
The Wang Rules for Finding all Spanning Trees of a Graph G
1. For each node write the sum of all the edge-labels that meet that node.
2. Leave out one node and take the product of the sums of labels for all the remaining nodes.
3. Expand the product in 2. using the Wang algebra.
4. The terms in the sum of the expansion obtained in 3. are in 1-1 correspondence with the spanning trees in the graph.
