= Sam Balsara =

Indian businessman

Sam Balsara is the founder, chairman and managing director of Madison World and Madison Communications.

== Early years ==
Balsara was born in Balsar, now called Valsad, Gujarat. His father was a forest contractor, and due to his work the family later moved to Bangalore. He studied at Bishop Cotton Boys' School, Bangalore before graduating from St. Joseph College, Bangalore. He completed his MBA from Jamnalal Bajaj Institute of Management Studies in Mumbai in 1970. He worked as a marketing executive at Sarabhais and Cadbury. Later, he switched to advertising, working with Hindustan Thompson Associates (the current J Walter Thompson).

== Madison ==
Balsara started the advertising agency Madison on 21 March 1988.

== Association ==
Balsara was president of the Advertising Club Bombay (1989-1992), chairman of the Advertising Standards Council of India (2000-1), president of the Advertising Agencies Association of India (2002-4), chairman of Triple A (Advertising Agencies Association of India) Awards, member of the Board of Governors of the Advertising Standards Council of India.

== Awards and recognition ==
- Media Service Person of the Year 2004 at the Dainik Bhaskar Indian Marketing Awards 2004
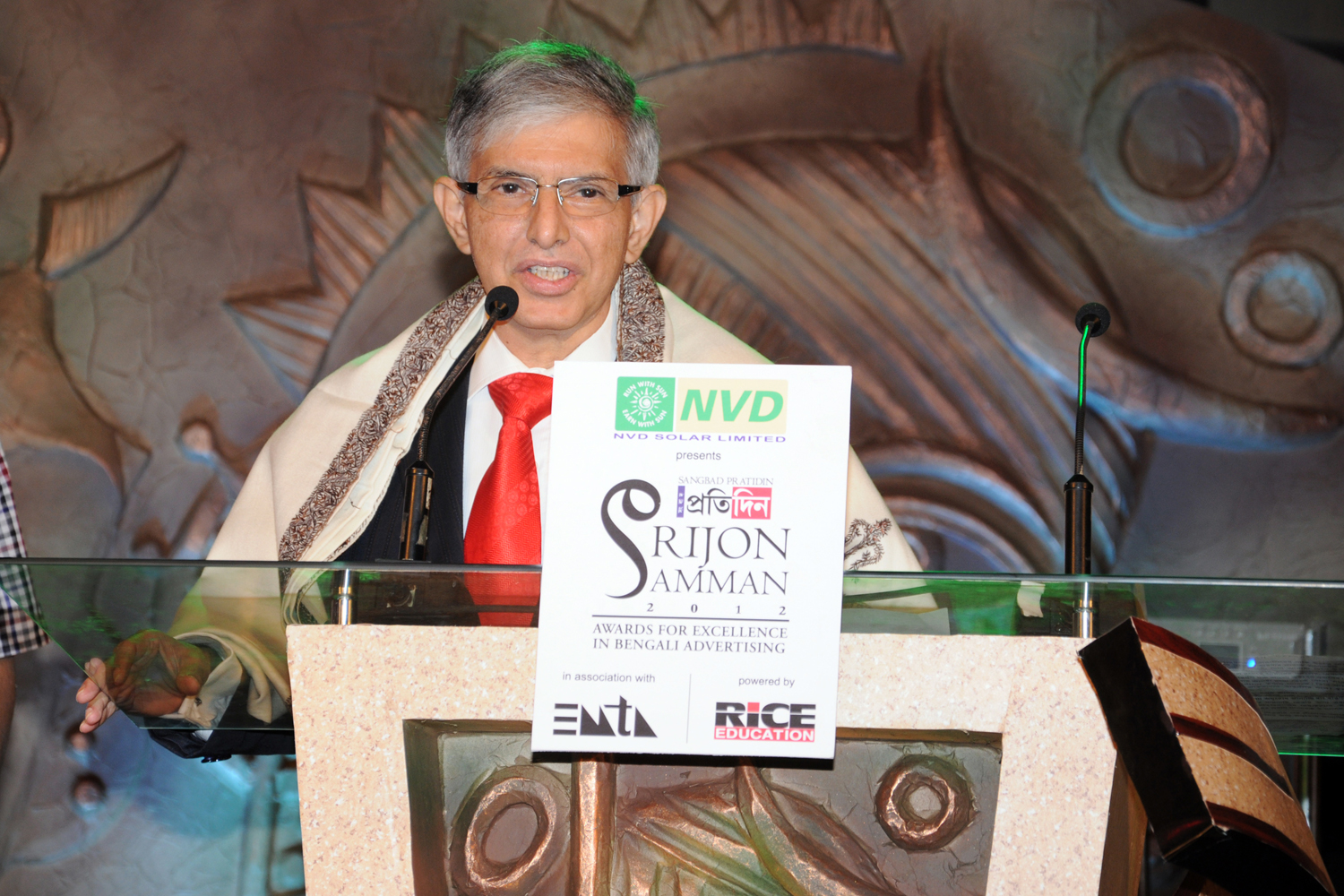
- Sam Balsara in Srijon Samman 2012 by Sangbad Pratidin
  Ranked 5th most influential person in the Indian Advertising Industry by Brand Equity Ad Agency Reckoner 2005.
- Ranked 50 most powerful people in Indian Marketing, Advertising and Media Business by Pitch magazine
- Ranked 4th most powerful person in Indian advertising by Mid-Day in June 2004
- Kolkata Ad Club Hall of Fame
- AAAI Lifetime Achievement Award for 2009
- Srijon Samman Award 2012 by Sangbad Pratidin

== Family ==
Balsara and his wife Homie have two daughters, Tanya and Lara. Balsara's elder daughter Tanya is visually handicapped and runs a small computer institute and teaches similarly visually impaired people. Lara joined Balsara's business as director, business development, after completing a master's degree in marketing from Bristol University. Lara is married to Kaizad Vajifdar, a pilot with Air India.
