= Andrea Baschirotto =

Italian academic

Andrea Baschirotto is a full professor at the University of Milano-Bicocca, Milano, Italy and a Director of the Microelectronics Group. In 2014 Andrea Baschirotto was named Fellow of the Institute of Electrical and Electronics Engineers (IEEE) "for contributions to analog filters."
