= Wei Zhang (computer engineer) =

Chinese electrical and computer engineer

Wei Zhang (Chinese: 張薇) is a Chinese electrical and computer engineer, and a professor in the Department of Electronic & Computer Engineering at the Hong Kong University of Science and Technology, where she is associate director of the Institute of Integrated Circuits and Systems and director of the Reconfigurable Computing Systems Lab. Topics in her research include reconfigurable computing, the design of multi-core processors with optical network on chip, and the use of field-programmable gate arrays to support deep neural networks.

Zhang has a 2009 Ph.D. from Princeton University. She worked as an assistant professor at Nanyang Technological University in Singapore, beginning in 2010, before joining the Hong Kong University of Science and Technology in 2013.

Zhang was named to the 2026 class of IEEE Fellows, "for contributions to agile design flow for FPGA and software-hardware co-design for embedded system security".
