= Jiangtao Wen =

Chinese engineer

Jiangtao Wen from the Tsinghua University, Beijing, China was named Fellow of the Institute of Electrical and Electronics Engineers (IEEE) in 2012 for contributions to multimedia communication technology and standards.
