= Zeng Bing =

Chinese engineer

Zeng Bing (Chinese: 曾兵) is an engineer at the University of Electronic Science and Technology of China (UESTC) in Sichuan, China. He was named a Fellow of the Institute of Electrical and Electronics Engineers (IEEE) in 2016 for his contributions to image and video coding.
