= Joseph Cavallaro =

American computer scientist

Joseph R. Cavallaro is a Professor of Electrical and Computer Engineering at Rice University and director of the Center for Multimedia Communication in Houston, Texas. He joined the faculty of Rice University in August 1988. He was named Fellow of the Institute of Electrical and Electronics Engineers (IEEE) in 2015 for contributions to VLSI architectures and algorithms for signal processing and wireless communications.

Cavallaro got his B.S.E.E. from the University of Pennsylvania in 1981 and a year later got his M.S.E.E. from Princeton University. He then attended Cornell University, where he got his Ph.D. in 1988.
