= Gianluca Mazzini =

Electronic engineer

Gianluca Mazzini (born 1968 in Bologna) from the University of Ferrara, Italy was named Fellow of the Institute of Electrical and Electronics Engineers (IEEE) in 2015 for contributions to chaos-based electronic and telecommunication systems design.

Mazzini graduated with a degree in electronic engineering (summa cum laude) in 1992 and in 1996 got his Ph.D. in electrical engineering and computer science at the University of Bologna. Following graduation, he joined faculty of the University of Ferrara, becoming its assistant professor in 1996 and associate professor in 2002. Since 1993, he leads studies in spread spectrum communications, wireless sensor networks, information security, ambient calculus, and cellular networks. Mazzini is an author and co-author of over 250 international publications, including books, journals and conference proceedings. He is also a former member of GARR and of the Centre of New Industries and Technologies and used to be a guest editor of the Proceedings of the IEEE and was an associate editor of various IEEE journals for the past nine years.
