= John D. Cressler =

American academic and author

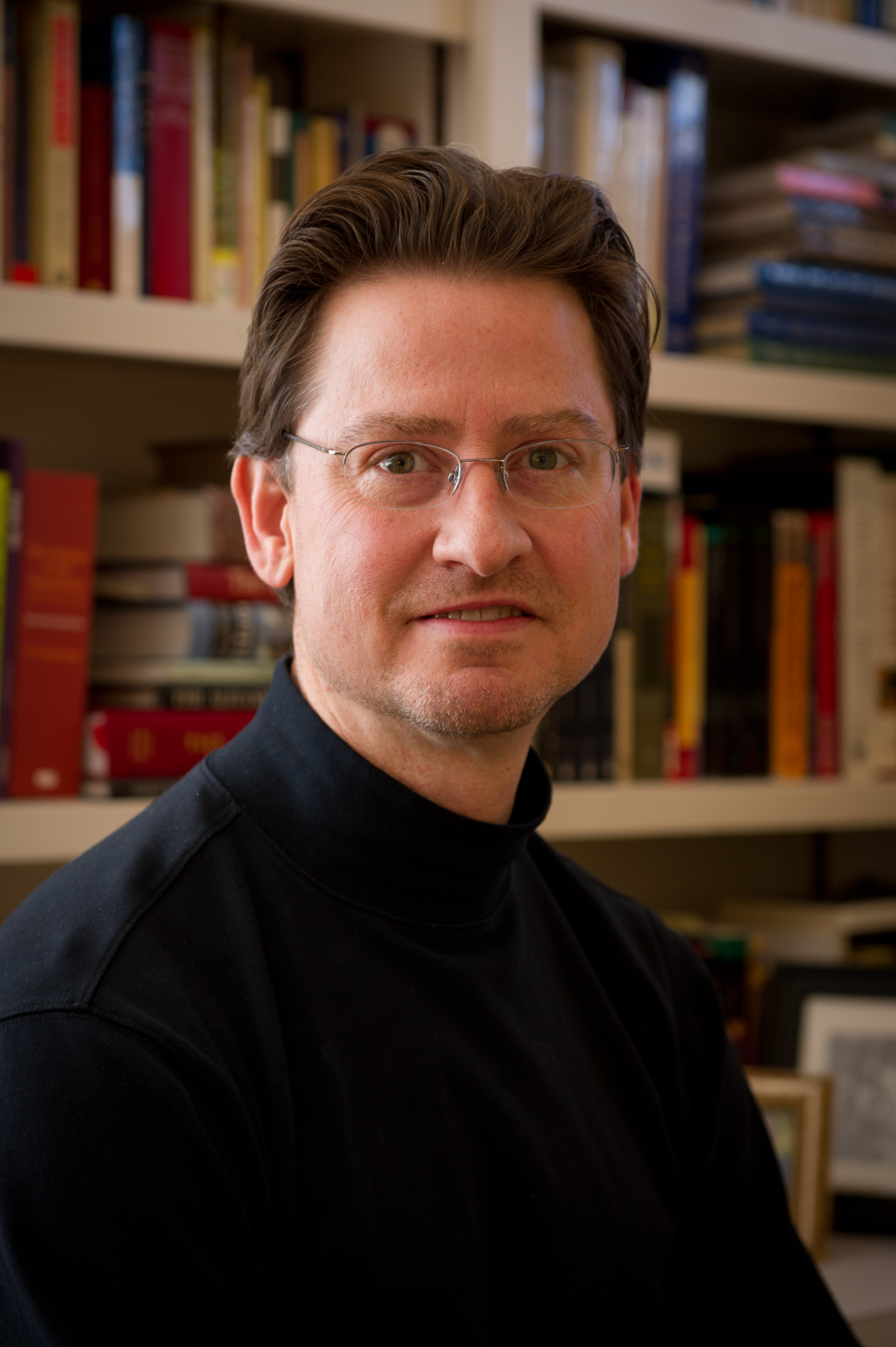
- Born: 1961 (age 64–65)
- Education: Georgia Institute of Technology (BS); Columbia University (PhD)
- Occupations: Professor, Author
- Website: johndcressler.com

John D. Cressler (born 1961) is an American academic and author, currently the Regents Professor and holder of the Schlumberger Chair in Electronics at Georgia Tech.

== Early life and education ==
John D. Cressler was born in 1961 and grew up in Georgia. He received his B.S. in physics from Georgia Tech in 1984, and his Ph.D. in applied physics from Columbia University in 1990. From 1984 to 1992, he was on the research staff at the IBM Thomas J. Watson Research Center, and from 1992 to 2002 he served on faculty at Auburn University. In 2002, he joined the faculty at Georgia Tech, and is currently Schlumberger Chair Professor of Electronics, in the School of Electrical and Computer Engineering.

== Research ==
Cressler's research is focused on the advancement of silicon-germanium (SiGe) electronics, with particular application to extreme environments. He has edited and authored various technical works related to SiGe and extreme environment electronics.

== Awards ==
The 2021 IEEE James H. Mulligan Jr. Education Medal was presented to John D. Cressler for inspirational teaching and mentoring of undergraduate and graduate students.

== Personal life ==
Cressler married his wife Maria while an undergraduate at Georgia Tech. They have three children.

== Publications ==
Cressler has authored three books related to SiGe electronics engineering, two works of non-fiction, and two novels.

=== Technical Non-Fiction ===
- Silicon-Germanium Heterojunction Bipolar Transistors, Artech House
- The Silicon Heterostructure Handbook: Materials, Fabrication, Devices, Circuits, and Applications of SiGe and Si Strained-Layer Epitaxy, CRC Press
- Extreme Environment Electronics, CRC Press

=== Non-Fiction ===
- Silicon Earth: Introduction to the Microelectronics and Nanotechnology Revolution, Cambridge University Press
- Reinventing Teenagers: The Gentle Art of Instilling Character in Our Young People, Xlibris (self-published)

=== Fiction ===
- Emeralds of the Alhambra, Sunbury Press
- Shadows in the Shining City, Sunbury Press
- Fortune's Lament, Sunbury Press
