= Toru Tanzawa =

Toru Tanzawa from Micron Technology, Tokyo, Japan was named Fellow of the Institute of Electrical and Electronics Engineers (IEEE) in 2016 for contributions to integrated high-voltage circuits.
