= Ketan Ramanlal Bulsara =

American neurologist

Ketan Ramanlal Bulsara was selected to be the Chief of Neurosurgery at the University of Connecticut. He also serves as the Director of Neurovascular/Endovascular Surgery and Director of Skull Base Microsurgery. He thus transitioned from serving in the Yale Department of Neurosurgery where he directed Neuroendovascular surgery and Skull Base Microsurgery.

== Background ==
Dr. Bulsara is a neurosurgeon who has dual fellowship training in skull base cerebrovascular microsurgery and endovascular neurosurgery. He was a member of the team that led to the identification of GAP-43 and CAP-23 co-expression and its ability to promote regeneration in the central nervous system.

== General ==
Dr. Bulsara was born in Mumbai, India. He grew up in Zambia, Central Africa, and immigrated to the United States in the 1980s. He went to Davidson College for his undergraduate studies. He attended Duke Medical School and graduated with honors. He completed his neurosurgical residency at Duke Medical Center. Dr. Bulsara received his training in microsurgery and endovascular surgery from the pioneers in the field.

Dr. Bulsara is consistently selected as one of the top surgeons/physicians in the United States by the Consumer Research Group of an America based company in Washington, D.C. Aside from holding numerous leadership positions in national and international neurosurgical societies, Dr. Bulsara was appointed to serve on the National Quality Forum for neurosciences. He has published more than 200 peer-reviewed articles and 3 books. In addition, he obtained an MBA from the Yale School of Management. He is a frequently invited national and international lecturer.
