= Philip Mok =

Electrical engineer and academic

Philip Mok Kwok-tai (莫國泰) is a professor of electrical engineering at the Hong Kong University of Science and Technology. He was named Fellow of the Institute of Electrical and Electronics Engineers (IEEE) in 2014 "for contributions to the design of analog power-management integrated circuits".
