= Ljiljana Trajković =

Researcher

- Education: University of Priština; Syracuse University; UCLA
- Occupation: Electrical engineer
- Awards: Fellow of the IEEE
- Scientific career
- Workplaces: Simon Fraser University; UC Berkeley; Bell Labs

Ljiljana Trajković is Professor with the School of Engineering Science, Simon Fraser University in Canada. She graduated from University of Pristina in 1974, got her master's degrees in electrical engineering (1979) and computer engineering (1981) from Syracuse University and PhD in electrical engineering from University of California, Los Angeles in 1986.

She was an National Science Foundation Visiting professor at UC Berkeley College of Engineering, and a research scientist and member of technical staff at Bell Labs and Bell Communications Research. She was the President of IEEE Circuits and Systems Society, IEEE Systems, Man, and Cybernetics Society and she currently serves as Editor-in-Chief of IEEE Transactions on Human-Machine Systems. In 2005, she was elected Fellow of the Institute of Electrical and Electronics Engineers "for contributions to computer aided design tools for circuit analysis."
