= Wonyong Sung =

South Korean electrical engineer (born 1955)

- Born: 1955 (age 70–71)
- Education: Seoul National University (BS); KAIST (MS); University of California, Santa Barbara (PhD)

Korean name
- Hangul: 성원용
- Hanja: 成元鎔
- RR: Seong Wonyong
- MR: Sŏng Wŏnyong
- IPA: /sʌŋ wʌɲjoŋ/

Wonyong Sung (born 1955) is a South Korean professor of electronic and information engineering at Seoul National University (SNU). Sung received his B.S. in engineering from SNU in 1978 and his M.S. in the same field from KAIST in 1980. After working for GoldStar for three years, he went on to the University of California, Santa Barbara for his Ph.D., which he completed in 1987. He was named a Fellow of the Institute of Electrical and Electronics Engineers (IEEE) in 2015 for "contributions to real-time signal processing systems".
