= Xicheng Jiang =

American computer engineer

Xicheng Jiang is a computer engineer with Broadcom Corporation in Irvine, California. He was named a Fellow of the Institute of Electrical and Electronics Engineers (IEEE) in 2014 for his development of communication systems-on-chip products.
