= Jordi Cortadella =

Spanish computer scientist

Jordi Cortadella Fortuny is a Spanish computer scientist specializing in electronic design automation. He is a professor of computer science at the Polytechnic University of Catalonia.

Cortadella was elected to the Academia Europaea in 2013. He was named as a Fellow of the Institute of Electrical and Electronics Engineers (IEEE) in 2015 for contributions to the design of asynchronous and elastic circuits.
