= Hidetoshi Onodera =

Japanese electrical engineer

Hidetoshi Onodera is a professor at the Department of Communications and Computer Engineering at Kyoto University. His research includes design technologies for digital, analog, and radio-frequency integrated circuits. Onodera was the program chair and general chair of International Conference on Computer-Aided Design and Asia and South Pacific Design Automation Conference. He is a member of Science Council of Japan.

Onodera was named Fellow of the Institute of Electrical and Electronics Engineers in 2018 "[f]or contributions to variation-aware design and analysis of integrated circuits".
