= Robert R. Bitmead =

American engineer

Robert R. Bitmead is an Australian engineer, currently the Cymer Corporation Professor in High Performance Dynamical Systems at the University of California, San Diego Jacobs School of Engineering, and a published author. He is a Fellow of the Institute of Electrical and Electronics Engineers and a Fellow of the Australian Academy of Technological Sciences & Engineering.

== Leadership ==
- IEEE Control Systems Society: Past President 2020, President 2019, President Elect 2018, Vice-president for Financial Activities 2015-16, common or garden member 1976-2015, 2017, 2021-present
- Editor-in-Chief IFAC Journal of Systems & Control from foundation in 2017 to 2022
- UCSD Associate Vice-Chancellor for Academic Personnel 2006-2009
- Cooperative Research Centre for Robust & Adaptive Systems, Australia, Executive Director, 1992-1999
- International Federation of Automatic Control (IFAC): Council member 1996-2002, Fellow Search Committee chair 2017-2020, Fellow Selection Committee chair 2014-2017, member 2011-2014

== Awards ==
- 2024 Alexander von Humboldt Research Award
- 2021 IEEE Control Systems Society Distinguished Member
- 2015 IEEE Control Systems Society Transition to Practice Award for advanced control applications in a range of industry sectors where each has involved innovation in theory to achieve the practical outcome
- 2014 ASME Rufus T. Oldenburger Medal for sustained contributions, in both theory and application, to joint system modeling and control design; and for work that has had major impact on model predictive control and controller certification based on experimental data
- 2002 IFAC Outstanding Service Award for sustained outstanding performance in major leadership positions in IFAC
- 2001-2006 IEEE Control Systems Society Distinguished Lecturer
- 2005 Fellow of the International Federation of Automatic Control
- 1999 Fellow of the Australian Academy of Technological Sciences & Engineering
- 1994 Australian National University Vice-Chancellor's Awards for Excellence in Teaching
- 1991 Fellow of the Institute of Electrical & Electronics Engineers
- 1989 Australian Telecommunications and Electronics Research Board Medal

== Education ==
- PhD, Electrical Engineering, University of Newcastle, Australia, 1980; Convergence properties of discrete-time stochastic estimation algorithms
- ME, Electrical Engineering, University of Newcastle, Australia, 1977; Matrix transfer function descriptions of linear systems
- BSc (Hons I), Applied Mathematics, Sydney University, Australia, 1976; Problems concerning stability in a sector for deterministic control systems: the problems of Lur'e and Aizerman
