= Howard Luong =

Electrical engineer

Howard Luong is an electrical engineer at the Hong Kong University of Science and Technology. He was named a Fellow of the Institute of Electrical and Electronics Engineers (IEEE) in 2014 for his contributions to CMOS radio frequency transceiver design.
