= Johan Suykens =

Engineer and academic

Johan Suykens is a full professor from KU Leuven in Belgium. He was named a Fellow of the Institute of Electrical and Electronics Engineers (IEEE) in 2015 for developing least squares support vector machines.
