= Michel Nakhla =

Professor and Researcher

Michel S. Nakhla
- Education: University of Waterloo
- Known for: Harmonic balance
- Awards: IEEE Fellowship
- Scientific career
- Fields: Electronic design automation
- Workplaces: Carleton University

Michel S Nakhla is a Chancellor's Professor at Carleton University and a researcher in electronic design automation. He is the founder of the high-speed CAD research group at Carleton University and is a frequently invited speaker on the topic of high-speed interconnects. He is the first pioneer to introduce the concept of harmonic balance, which is the backbone of current RF and microwave circuit simulators. He was awarded the IEEE Fellowship in 1998 for his contributions to the development of advanced computer-aided design techniques for microwave circuits and high-speed interconnects. He has authored and co-authored over 300 technical papers that have contributed significantly to the evolution of the design automation field.
