= Deepnarayan Gupta =

American electrical engineer

Deepnarayan Gupta is an electrical engineer at HYPRES, Inc., in Elmsford, New York. He was named a Fellow of the Institute of Electrical and Electronics Engineers (IEEE) in 2015 for his contributions to superconductor digital radio frequency receivers.
