= Chung Pau-choo =

Taiwanese electrical engineer

Julia Chung Pau-choo is a Taiwanese electrical engineer.

== Education and career ==
Chung earned a bachelor's degree in electrical engineering from National Cheng Kung University in 1981, followed by a master's degree in the same subject in 1983. She subsequently graduated in 1991 from Texas Tech University with a doctorate, and accepted a faculty position at NCKU in 1996. Chung was elevated to a distinguished professorship in 2005. In 2008, Chung was elected a fellow of the IEEE. Chung was a founding member of Women in Circuits and Systems in 2008, a subcommittee sanctioned by the board of governors of the IEEE Circuits and Systems Society, and served as its founding chair until 2009.
