= Amir Said =

Amir Said is an engineer at Hewlett Packard Laboratories in Cupertino, California. He was named a Fellow of the Institute of Electrical and Electronics Engineers (IEEE) in 2014 for his contributions to compression and processing of images and videos.
