= Tanay Karnik =

Tanay Karnik is an electrical engineer from Intel Corporation in Hillsboro, Oregon. He was named a Fellow of the Institute of Electrical and Electronics Engineers (IEEE) in 2014 for his contributions to error-tolerant circuits and near-load voltage regulators.
