= Jan Craninckx =

Belgian engineer

Jan Craninckx from the Interuniversity Microelectronics Center (IMEC), Leuven, Belgium was named Fellow of the Institute of Electrical and Electronics Engineers (IEEE) in 2014 for contributions to the design of CMOS RF transceivers.

== Education ==
Craninckx received the M.S. and Ph.D. degrees from the ESAT-MICAS Laboratories, KU Leuven, Leuven, Belgium, in 1992 and 1997, respectively.
