= Poras Balsara =

Indian engineer

Poras Balsara from the University of Texas, Dallas was named Fellow of the Institute of Electrical and Electronics Engineers (IEEE) in 2014 for contributions to the design of all-digital frequency synthesis.
