= Josep Miquel Jornet =

Spanish-American electrical engineer

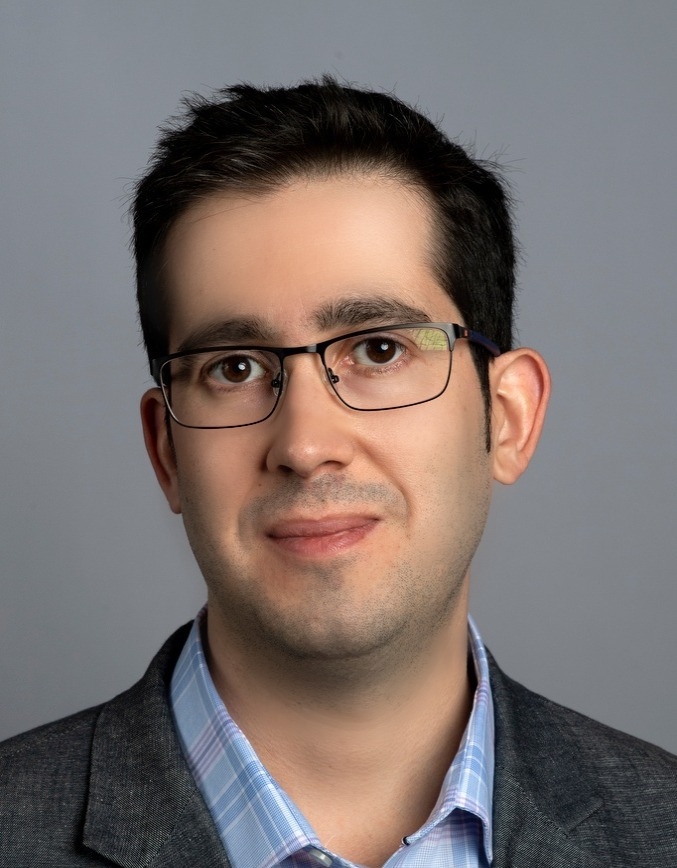
- Born: 1984 (age 41–42); Tarragona, Catalonia, Spain
- Citizenship: Spain, United States
- Education: Universitat Politècnica de Catalunya (B.S., M.S.); Georgia Institute of Technology (Ph.D.)
- Known for: Terahertz communications, graphene plasmonic nano-antennas, Internet of Nano-Things
- Awards: IEEE Fellow (2024); NSF CAREER Award (2019)
- Scientific career
- Fields: Terahertz communications Wireless networks Nanonetworks
- Workplaces: Northeastern University University at Buffalo
- Doctoral advisor: Ian F. Akyildiz

Josep Miquel Jornet is a Spanish-American electrical engineer and COE Distinguished Professor of Electrical and Computer Engineering at Northeastern University, where he also serves as Associate Dean of Research in the College of Engineering and directs the Ultrabroadband Nanonetworking Laboratory. His research concerns terahertz-band wireless communications, nanonetworks, and the Internet of Nano-Things. His early work covers graphene-based plasmonic nano-antennas and terahertz channel modeling. He was elected an IEEE Fellow in 2024 for contributions to terahertz communication and nanonetworking.

== Early life and education ==
Jornet was born in 1984 in Tarragona, Catalonia, Spain, and grew up between Tarragona and the nearby village of Ascó. He received the B.S. in Telecommunications Engineering and the M.S. in Information and Communication Technologies from the Universitat Politècnica de Catalunya in 2008, with master's thesis research on cross-layer design for underwater acoustic networks conducted at the Massachusetts Institute of Technology under Milica Stojanovic. He received the Ph.D. in Electrical and Computer Engineering from the Georgia Institute of Technology in 2013, advised by Ian F. Akyildiz, with a dissertation titled Fundamentals of Electromagnetic Nanonetworks in the Terahertz Band. His doctoral studies were supported by La Caixa and Fundación Caja Madrid fellowships.

== Career ==
Jornet joined the University at Buffalo as an Assistant Professor of Electrical Engineering in 2013 and was promoted with early tenure to Associate Professor in 2019. That year he moved to Northeastern University as Associate Professor of Electrical and Computer Engineering and became founding director of the Ultrabroadband Nanonetworking Laboratory. He was promoted to Professor in 2023 and named COE Distinguished Professor in 2026. He served as Interim Chair of Electrical and Computer Engineering in 2024 and became Associate Dean of Research for the College of Engineering in 2025. He is also Associate Director of the Institute for Intelligent Networked Systems (formerly the Institute for the Wireless Internet of Things).

In 2025, Jornet co-founded Teradio, a startup commercializing sub-terahertz wireless technology for data center interconnects, where he serves as Chief Scientific Advisor.

== Research ==
Jornet's research involves many aspects of terahertz wireless systems, including graphene-based nano-devices, channel modeling, physical-layer, medium-access, and network protocols, and testbed implementation. His contributions include:

- Graphene plasmonic nano-antennas and channel modeling for the terahertz band (with Akyildiz, 2010–2014), which established theoretical foundations for nanoscale electromagnetic communication. The 2014 Physical Communication article Terahertz Band: Next Frontier for Wireless Communications has been cited over 1,100 times.
- Ultra-massive MIMO for the 0.06–10 THz range, proposed in 2016, which influenced subsequent work on 6G antenna array architectures.
- The TeraNova testbed, an early integrated platform for true terahertz-frequency wireless experimentation.
- Wavefront engineering and near-field terahertz communications, including the use of Bessel beams, orbital angular momentum, and reconfigurable intelligent surfaces for 6G.
- Coexistence and spectrum sharing above 100 GHz between active communication systems and passive scientific users such as radio astronomy and Earth observation.
- Non-terrestrial terahertz networks, including CubeSat and low Earth orbit satellite links.
- Biological effects of terahertz radiation and in vivo wireless nanosensor networks.

As of 2026, his publications have accumulated over 23,500 citations with an h-index of 70 on Google Scholar. He is co-author of the monograph Fundamentals of Electromagnetic Nanonetworks in the Terahertz Band (Now Publishers, 2013) and holds seven issued U.S. patents.

== Editorial and standards activities ==
Jornet served as Editor-in-Chief of Nano Communication Networks (Elsevier) from 2016 to 2026. He serves as Associate Editor of IEEE Transactions on Communications, IEEE Transactions on Molecular, Biological, and Multi-Scale Communications, and Scientific Reports. He has been a member of the IEEE 802.15 Standing Committee on Terahertz Communications since 2013 and, in 2026, became the founding chair of the IEEE Communications Society Technical Working Group on Terahertz Communications; he previously chaired the society's Radio Communications Committee Special Interest Group on Terahertz Communications (2023–2025).

== Honors and awards ==
- IEEE Fellow, 2024, "for contributions to terahertz communication and nanonetworking"
- IEEE Communications Society Distinguished Lecturer, 2022–2024
- IEEE Communications Society Best Survey Paper Award, 2025
- IEEE Wireless Communications Technical Committee Outstanding Young Researcher Award, 2022
- IEEE Radio Communications Committee Early Achievement Award, 2022
- ACM NanoCom Outstanding Milestone Award, 2017
- NSF CAREER Award, 2019
- Søren Buus Outstanding Research Award, Northeastern University College of Engineering, 2023
- Distinguished Faculty Award, Northeastern University College of Engineering, 2026

== Selected publications ==
- Akyildiz, I. F.; Jornet, J. M.; Han, C. (2014). "Terahertz Band: Next Frontier for Wireless Communications". Physical Communication. 12: 16–32.
- Jornet, J. M.; Akyildiz, I. F. (2011). "Channel Modeling and Capacity Analysis for Electromagnetic Wireless Nanonetworks in the Terahertz Band". IEEE Transactions on Wireless Communications. 10 (10): 3211–3221.
- Akyildiz, I. F.; Jornet, J. M. (2010). "The Internet of Nano-Things". IEEE Wireless Communications. 17 (6): 58–63.
- Ma, J.; Shrestha, R.; Adelberg, J.; et al. (2018). "Security and Eavesdropping in Terahertz Wireless Links". Nature. 563: 89–93.
- Sen, P.; Siles, J. V.; Thawdar, N.; Jornet, J. M. (2023). "Multi-kilometre and Multi-Gigabit-per-Second Sub-Terahertz Communications for Backhaul Applications". Nature Electronics. 6 (2): 164–175.
- Akyildiz, I. F.; Jornet, J. M. (2016). "Realizing Ultra-Massive MIMO Communication in the (0.06–10) Terahertz Band". Nano Communication Networks. 8: 46–54.
