= Ian F. Akyildiz =

Turkish-American engineer (born 1954)

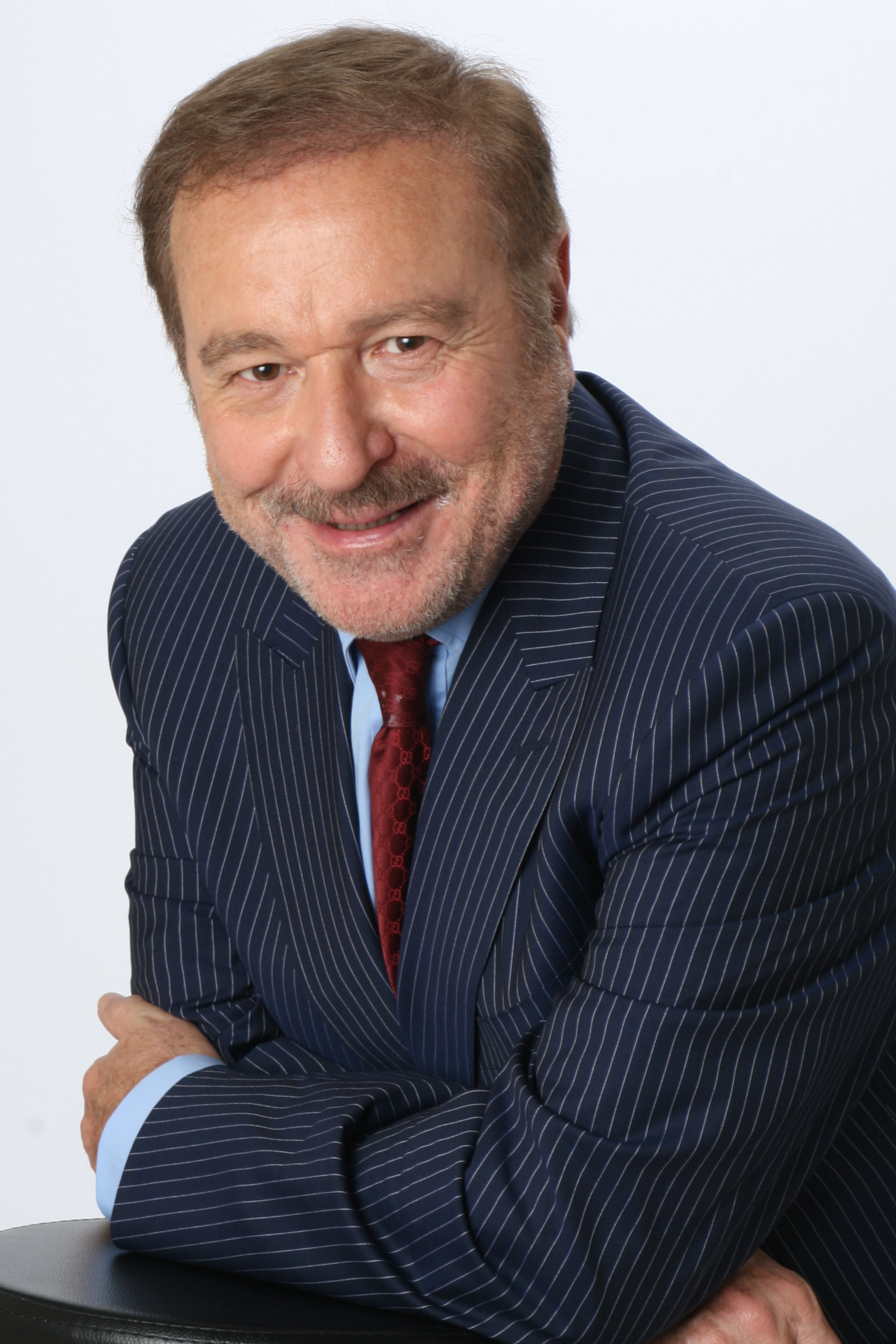
- Born: İlhan Fuat Akyıldız; April 11, 1954 (age 72); Istanbul, Turkey
- Education: University of Erlangen
- Scientific career
- Fields: Electrical and Computer Engineering; Telecommunications; Wireless Communication Networks
- Workplaces: Georgia Tech; University of Helsinki); International Telecommunication Union; Technology Innovation Institute; University of Iceland
- Thesis: Leistungsanalyse von Multiprozessorsystemen mit Prozesskommunikation (1984)
- Doctoral advisor: Gunter Bolch; Fridolin Hofmann
- Doctoral students: Jiang Xie; Josep Miquel Jornet

Ian F. Akyildiz (born İlhan Fuat Akyıldız on April 11, 1954) is a Turkish-American electrical engineer who is the President and CTO of the Truva Inc since March 1989. He retired from the School of Electrical and Computer Engineering (ECE) at Georgia Tech in 2021 after almost 35 years service as Ken Byers Chair Professor in Telecommunications and Chair of the Telecom group.

He serves on the advisory board of the Technology Innovation Institute (TII) in Abu Dhabi, United Arab Emirates since June 1, 2020. He is also an adjunct professor with the University of Helsinki since 2021, University of Iceland since 2020, and University of Cyprus since 2017.

Akyildiz was the Megagrant Research Leader and Advisor to the Director of the Institute for Information Transmission Problems at the Russian Academy of Sciences, in Moscow, Russia, (2018–2020). He is the Ken Byers Chair Professor Emeritus in Telecommunications, Past Chair of the Telecom group at the ECE and the Director of the Broadband Wireless Networking Laboratory at the Georgia Institute of Technology (1985–2020). He founded the N3Cat (NanoNetworking Center) at the Universitat Politecnica de Catalunya, in Barcelona, Spain, in 2008.

His research interests are in 6G/7G, Wireless Systems, TeraHertz Communication, Reconfigurable Intelligent Surfaces, Nanonetworks, Internet of Space Things/CUBESATs, Internet of BioNanoThings, Molecular Communication and Underwater Communication. According to Google Scholar as of April 2023, his h-index is 135 and the total number of citations to his papers is 140+K.

== Research contributions ==
=== Queueing Network Models ===
Akyildiz started his research work on queueing networks models in the early 1980s. His PhD thesis (1984) was entitled “Multiprocessor Systems with Process Communication” where he developed queuing network models to analyze the performance of the multiprocessor systems which were important subject in the early 1980s. In particular, he developed queueing network models for process communication where the buffers were finite and blocking/losses of messages could occur.

His paper was the first which was an original work introducing the duality of the state spaces of queueing networks with blocking/finite buffers versus queueing networks without blocking kind of mapping of state space to each other, and accordingly obtaining exact product form solution for two nodes. Based on this novel duality concept, Akyildiz showed in an approximate duality (mapping) of state spaces between queuing networks with and without blocking having arbitrary number of nodes. He then derived the approximate throughput formula and also derived approximate product form solutions in.

=== ATM and Wireless ATM Networks ===
In 1997, Akyildiz with his colleagues at the YURIE systems designed and implemented the first adaptive forward-error-correction solution on the link layer of their wireless ATM switch providing high reliability in wireless ATM networks with very low bit data rates used in battlefield scenarios. A patent for this solution was obtained in 2006 U.S. patent 7,058,027.

A technical paper describing the link layer design on this low bit rate wireless ATM switch was published. The founder of the Yurie Systems, Jeong H. Kim, received the entrepreneur of the year award in 1997 and Yurie Systems was acquired by Lucent for 1 Billion US Dollars in 1998.

=== Mobility Management in 2G and 3G Cellular Systems ===
Akyildiz significantly contributed to mobility and resource management of 2G and 3G cellular systems in the 90s. He proposed many handoff management, location registration, and paging schemes for the design of 3G and 4G wireless systems, and all of his papers have been published in top notch journals and conferences between 1998 and 2000.

His paper titled “Mobility Management in Next-Generation Wireless Systems” was invited to be included in Proceedings of IEEE, and is the most cited paper on mobility management in the literature, and became “the” main reading material for the first course on mobile networks in many universities. His contributions to mobility and resource management gained him the ACM Fellow rank in 1997.

=== 4G Wireless Systems and Mobility/Resource Management ===
Akyildiz started to use the notion “4G” wireless networks in 1999-2000 through his papers and keynote speeches. He pointed out the requirements for heterogeneous 4G wireless systems, such as anywhere/anytime wireless connectivity with hundreds of Mbps bandwidth per mobile user for both data and multimedia services. Consequently, the first adaptive protocol suite framework for Next Generation Wireless Internet was supported by NSF (National Science Foundation) (2000–2005) NSF #:ANI-0117840.

The culmination of his research work on this topic gained him the 2003 ACM SIGMOBILE Outstanding Contribution Award for his "pioneering contributions in the area of mobility and resource management for wireless communication networks", in September 2003.

==== Satellite and HALO (High Altitude Low Orbit) Communication ====
Akyildiz, in collaboration and with support of NASA, developed several routing algorithms and a novel transport control protocol called TCP Peach to realize practical satellite networks. He significantly contributed towards the development and realization of high altitude long operation (HALO) networks for providing broadband wireless network access which was implemented by Angel Technologies and Raytheon, exploited by invention disclosures (U.S. patent 6,756,937) and U.S. patent 7,027,769).

His paper is the first to comprehensively put forward the design principles and system reference model for HALO networks, which is a broadband wireless metropolitan area network with a star topology, whose solitary hub is located in the atmosphere above the service area at an altitude higher than commercial airline traffic.

=== Wireless Sensor Networks ===
With the publication of a roadmap paper on wireless sensor networks, Akyildiz made this research area known. This publication has received more than 41,000 citations in 20 years. This paper received the best tutorial paper award from IEEE Communications society in 2003.

Akyildiz published many pioneering papers on wireless sensor networks. For example, in the first reliable protocol (Event-to-Sink Reliable Transport -ESRT-) was introduced specifically tailored for the unique requirements and characteristics of wireless sensor networks. ESRT was devised based on the extremely novel and yet practical engineering notion of event-to-sink reliability, which leverages the inherent redundancy and spatio-temporal correlation in sensor networks to maximize the network lifetime. ESRT has also been taught in undergraduate and graduate level wireless networking courses at many universities. This work has been implemented in several simulation tools.

The pioneering contributions to the field of wireless sensor networks was recognized as the IEEE Computer Society W. Wallace McDowell Award 2011.

=== Wireless Sensor Networks in challenged environments ===
Akyildiz was one of the first to introduce several advanced and next generation wireless sensor network paradigms and architectures to the research community including sensor and actor networks, multimedia sensor networks, underwater acoustic sensor networks, wireless underground sensor networks, underground magnetic sensor networks, along with the comprehensive list of open research issues and the first novel communication techniques.

Preliminary version of this paper received the best paper award from IEEE GlobeCom 2009 conference.

==== Cognitive Radio Networks/Dynamic Spectrum Access Networks ====
The paper became the flagpole paper that every researcher reads first as the first initiation into the field of CR networks during the heyday of the CR networks. The paper had major impact as it is the first work which demonstrated the existence of optimal sensing parameters theoretically and developed the framework to support this optimality in real network environments. This paper identified the interference model for CR, well-motivated from the limitation of communication hardware that RF front-ends cannot differentiate between the transmissions of primary and secondary users. It developed a practical spectrum sensing solution, where an optimal observation time and a transmission time are determined to maximize sensing efficiency while satisfying interference limits.

The paper is the first research work that identifies the practical issues and derives possible solutions when extending the CR concept to cellular mobile networks. Specifically, this paper defined two mobility types in the CR cellular networks, user mobility and spectrum mobility.

Akyildiz and his PhD students coined the word “CRAHNs” for the first time in, which is used as a standard terminology by the research community in the meantime. Specifically, this paper looked at the network architectures, where multiple nodes are not associated with a single controller (hence, called CR ad hoc networks or CRAHNs).

=== Nanonetworks/Internet of NanoThings ===
Akyildiz and his student Josep Miquel Jornet proposed for the first time and investigated the use of graphene to develop nano-antennas for electromagnetic (EM) communication in nanonetworks. This paper showed that, by using a narrow graphene nanoribbon (GNR), an antenna just a few hundreds of nanometers long and tens of nanometers wide could radiate EM waves in the Terahertz (THz) band (0.1-10 THz). This framework is used to characterize the propagation characteristics of Surface Plasmon Polariton (SPP) waves in graphene.

Akyildiz and Jornet also proposed a plasmonic nano-transceiver that intrinsically operate in the THz band in where the basic idea is based on the integration of III-V High-Electron-Mobility Transistors (HEMT) with graphene in. In 2016, a US Patent is obtained for this technology.

Akyildiz and Jornet also developed very large plasmonic nano-antenna Planar Array with 32x32 (in total of 1024) elements which is called'"Ultra-Massive MIMO communication systems" in and a patent was issued for this idea in 2017.

=== Molecular communication/Internet of BioNanoThings ===
While nanonetworks do not operate based on radio frequency spectrums, they mainly exploit networking paradigms which are fundamentally different yet “wireless” such as molecular communication, where the information is coded and communicated by molecules as explored in and the term “Internet of BioNanoThings: was coined in the paper for the first time.

Akyildiz and his student Pierobon also developed one of the first realistic molecular communication channel models and capacity analysis for molecular communication in.

=== TeraHertz Band Communication ===
Terahertz Band (0.1-10 THz) communication is envisioned as one of the key wireless technologies of the next decade. The THz band plans to help overcome the spectrum scarcity problems and capacity limitations of current wireless networks, by providing an unprecedentedly large bandwidth. In addition, THz-band communication will supposedly enable a plethora of applications ranging from instantaneous massive data transfer among nearby devices in Terabit Wireless Personal and Local Area Networks, to ultra-high-definition content streaming over mobile devices in 6G systems.

The THz-band channel was investigated in and the first channel model was developed for this almost unexplored frequency range. The peculiarities of the channel were captured by utilizing radiative transfer theory to account for the absorption from different types of gaseous molecules. In addition, he analytically calculated the channel capacity of the THz band for different medium compositions and power allocation schemes.

=== Reconfigurable Intelligent Surfaces ===
Electromagnetic waves undergo multiple uncontrollable alterations as they propagate within a wireless environment. Free space path loss, signal absorption, as well as reflections, refractions, and diffractions caused by physical objects within the environment highly affect the performance of wireless communications. Currently, such effects are intractable to account for and are treated as probabilistic factors. A radically different approach, enabling deterministic, programmable control over the behavior of wireless environments was first introduced in the VISORSURF project.

The key enabler is the so-called HyperSurface tile, a novel class of two-dimensional metamaterials that can interact with impinging electromagnetic waves in a controlled manner. The tiles can effectively re-engineer electromagnetic waves, including steering toward any desired direction, full absorption, polarization manipulation. Multiple tiles coat objects such as walls, furniture, and other objects in indoor and outdoor settings. An external software service calculates and deploys the optimal interaction types per tile to best fit the needs of communicating devices. A patent was acquired in January 2020.

=== The Internet of Space Things with CubeSats ===
A novel cyber-physical system spanning ground, air, and space, called the Internet of Space Things/CubeSats (IoST) is introduced in. IoST expands the functionalities of traditional IoT, by not only providing an always-available satellite backhaul network, but also by contributing real-time satellite-captured information and, more importantly, performing integration of on the ground data and satellite information to enable new applications. The fundamental building block for IoST is a new generation of nano-satellites known as CubeSats, which are augmented with Software Defined Networking (SDN) and Network Function Virtualization (NFV) solutions.

== Editing ==
He is the founder and editor in chief of the ITU (International Telecommunication Union) Journal on Future and Evolving Technologies (ITU-J FET)] since August 2020. Akyildiz is the Editor-in-Chief Emeritus of Computer Networks Journal (Elsevier) (1999–2019), the founding Editor-in-Chief Emeritus of the Ad Hoc Networks Journal (Elsevier) (2003–2019), Physical Communication (PHYCOM) Journal (Elsevier) (2008–2017), and Nano Communication Networks (NANOCOMNET) Journal (Elsevier) (2010–2017).

He is a former editor for IEEE/ACM Transactions on Networking (1996–2001), Kluwer Journal of Cluster Computing (1997–2001), ACM-Springer Journal for Multimedia Systems (1995–2002), for IEEE Transactions on Computers (1992–1996) as well as for ACM-Springer Journal of Wireless Networks (WINET) (1995–2005).

== Textbooks ==
- I. F. Akyildiz and X. Wang: Wireless Mesh Networks, John Wiley Publishing Company, ISBN 978-0-470-03256-5, February 2009.
- I. F. Akyildiz and M. C. Vuran: Wireless Sensor Networks, John Wiley Publishing Company, ISBN 978-0-470-03601-3, August 2010.
- Z. Sun and I. F. Akyildiz, "Key Communication Techniques for Underground Sensor Networks," Foundations and Trends in Networking, Now Publishers Inc., ISBN 978-1-60198-550-7, April 2012.
- J. M. Jornet and I. F. Akyildiz, "Fundamentals of Electromagnetic Nanonetworks in the Terahertz Band," Foundations and Trends in Networking, Now Publishers Inc., ISBN 978-1-601-98736-5, November 2013
- M. Pierobon and I. F. Akyildiz, "Fundamentals of Diffusion-Based Molecular Communication in Nanonetworks," Foundations and Trends in Networking, Now Publishers Inc, ISBN 978-1-601-98816-4, April 2014.

== Patents ==
- I. F. Akyildiz and A. Kak, "A Low-Overhead Online Routing Scheme for Ultra-Dense Software-Defined CubeSat Networks", US Patent Application No. 63/091712 on October 2, 2020.
- I. F. Akyildiz and A. Kak, "Large-Scale Constellation Design Framework", US Patent Application No. 63/091666 on August 15, 2020.
- I. F. Akyildiz, A. Kak, and S. Nie, "Network Employing Cube Satellites", WO Patent Application No. WO2020124076A1 on June 1, 2020.
- A. Pitsillides, Christos Liaskos, A. Tsioliaridou, S. Ioannides, and I. F. Akyildiz, "Wireless communication paradigm: realizing programmable wireless environments through software-controlled metasurfaces", U.S. patent 10,547,116 on February 7, 2020.
- M. Luo, S.-C. Lin, and I.F. Akyildiz, "Maximize network capacity policy with heavy-tailed traffic", U.S. patent 10,237,194 on March 19, 2019.
- M. Luo, S.-C. Lin, and I.F. Akyildiz, "Software defined network traffic congestion control", U.S. patent 10,153,974 on December 11, 2018.
- I.F. Akyildiz, H.K. Schmidt, S.-C. Lin, and A.A. Al-Shehri, "Environment-aware cross-layer communication protocol in underground oil reservoirs", U.S. Patent No. 10,117,042 on October 30, 2018.
- M. Luo, S.-C. Lin, and I.F. Akyildiz, "Multi-controller control traffic balancing in software defined networks", U.S. patent 10,091,093 on October 2, 2018.
- H.K. Schmidt, I.F. Akyildiz, S.-C. Lin, and A.A. Al-Shehri, "Magnetic induction based localization for wireless sensor networks in underground oil reservoirs", U.S. patent 10,048,400 on August 14, 2018.
- I. F. Akyildiz and J. M. Jornet, "Ultra Massive MIMO Communication in the Terahertz Band," U.S. patent 9,825,712 B2 on November 21, 2017.
- I. F. Akyildiz and J. M. Jornet, "Graphene-based Plasmonic Nano-antenna for Terahertz Band Communication," U.S. patent 9,643,841 on May 9, 2017.
- I.F. Akyildiz, and J.M. Jornet, "Graphene-based Plasmonic Nano-Transceiver employing HEMT for Terahertz Band Communication", U.S. patent 9,397,758 on July 19, 2016.
- I. F. Akyildiz, D. Gutierrez-Estevez, and E. Chavarria-Reyes, "Femto-Relay Systems and Methods of Managing Same," U.S. patent 8,976,690 B2 on March 10, 2015.
- I. F. Akyildiz, "Systems and Methods for Asynchronous Transfer Mode and Internet Protocol," U.S. Patent No. U.S. patent 7,058,027 in June 2006.

== Awards ==
- Best Paper Award for "Automatic Network Slicing for Resource Allocation in Underwater Acoustic Communication Systems" at the Fourth International Balkan Conference on Communications and Networking (BalkanCom 2021) in September 2021.
- "Pioneer Award in Underwater Communication", for "his significant contributions to underwater communication networks" at the 13th ACM International Conference on Underwater Networks & Systems (WUWNet'18) in Shenzhen, China on December 4, 2018.
- IEEE ComSoc Technical Committee on Cognitive Networks (TCCN) Recognition Award for "pioneering contributions to spectrum sensing, spectrum sharing algorithms and communication protocols for cognitive radio networks" in October 2017.
- ACM MSWIM Reginald A. Fassenden Award with the citation: "For pioneering contributions for modeling and analysis of cellular and multihop wireless communication systems" in September 2014.
- Humboldt Research Prize from Alexander von Humboldt Foundation, Germany, in November 2013.
- FiDiPro (Finland Distinguished Professor) Professorship at Tampere University of Technology, Department of Communications Engineering, Finland, supported by the Academy of Science in Finland, in January 2013 for the next 4 years.
- 2011 TUBITAK (Turkish National Science Foundation) Exclusive Award for "Outstanding contributions to the advancement of scholarship/research at international level", December 2011.
- 2011 IEEE Computer Society W. Wallace McDowell Award for "Pioneering contributions to wireless sensor network architectures and communication protocols", in May 2011.
- 2010 IEEE Communications Society Ad Hoc and Sensor Networks Technical Committee (AHSN TC) Technical Recognition Award with the citation: "For pioneering contributions to wireless sensor networks and wireless mesh networks", December 2010.
- Best Paper Award for "Deployment Algorithms for Wireless Underground Sensor Networks using Magnetic Induction" in the IEEE Global Communications Conference (Globecom), December 2010.
- Best Paper Award for "Interferer Classification, Channel Selection and Transmission Adaptation for Wireless Sensor Networks" in the Ad Hoc and Sensor Networks (AHSN) symposium at IEEE International Conference on Communications (ICC), June 2009.
- 2009 ECE Distinguished Mentor Award for mentoring junior faculty (in connection with teaching and research activities) by the Georgia Tech School of Electrical and Computer Engineering in April.
- 2009 Georgia Tech Outstanding Doctoral Thesis Advisor Award for his 20+ years service and dedication to Georgia Tech and producing outstanding PhD students in April 2009.
- 2005 Distinguished Faculty Achievement Award from School of ECE, Georgia Tech, April 2005.
- 2004 Georgia Tech Faculty Research Author Award for his "Outstanding record of publications of papers between 1999-2003", April 2004.
- 2003 ACM SIGMOBILE Outstanding Contribution Award for his "Pioneering contributions in the area of mobility and resource management for wireless communication networks", September 2003.
- 2003 Best Tutorial Paper Award (IEEE Communications Society) for this paper entitled "A Survey on Sensor Networks" published in the IEEE Communications Magazine, August 2002.
- 2002 IEEE Harry M. Goode Memorial Award (IEEE Computer Society) with the citation "For significant and pioneering contributions to advanced architectures and protocols for wireless and satellite networking".
- 1997 IEEE Leonard G. Abraham Prize award (IEEE Communications Society) for his paper entitled "Multimedia Group Synchronization Protocols for Integrated Services Architectures" published in the IEEE Journal of Selected Areas in Communications (JSAC) in January 1996.
- ACM Outstanding Distinguished Lecturer Award for 1994.
- 1997 ACM Fellow with the citation: "For fundamental research contributions in: finite capacity queuing network models; performance evaluation of Time Warp parallel simulations; traffic Control in ATM networks, and mobility management in wireless networks".
- 1996 IEEE Fellow with the citation: "For contributions to performance analysis of computer communication networks".
- ACM Distiguinshed Lecturer Award in 1994.
- The Don Federico Santa Maria Medal for his services to the Universidad of Federico Santa Maria in Chile in 1986.
