= Telecommunications =

Transmission of information electromagnetically

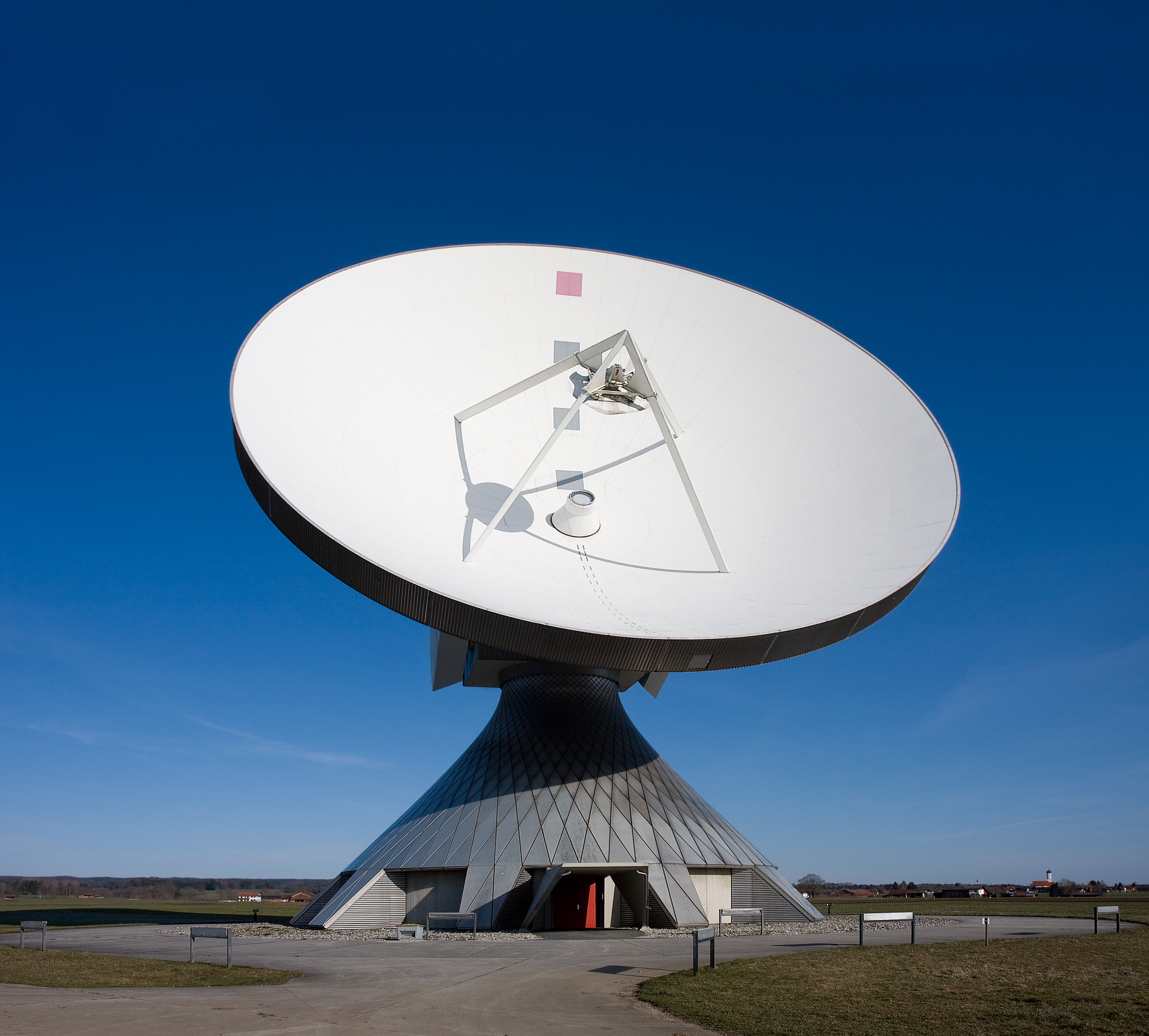
Earth station at the satellite communication facility Raisting Earth Station in Raisting, Weilheim-Schongau, Bavaria, Germany

Telecommunication, often used in its plural form or abbreviated as telecom, is the transmission of information over a distance using electrical or electronic means, typically through cables, radio waves, or other communication technologies. These means of transmission may be divided into communication channels for multiplexing, allowing for a single medium to transmit several concurrent communication sessions. Long-distance technologies invented during the 19th, 20th and 21st centuries generally use electric power, and include the electrical telegraph, telephone, television, and radio.

Early telecommunication networks used metal wires as the medium for transmitting signals. These networks were used for telegraphy and telephony for many decades. In the first decade of the 20th century, a revolution in wireless communication began with breakthroughs including those made in radio communications by Guglielmo Marconi, who won the 1909 Nobel Prize in Physics. Other early pioneers in electrical and electronic telecommunications include co-inventors of the telegraph Charles Wheatstone and Samuel Morse, numerous inventors and developers of the telephone including Antonio Meucci, Philipp Reis, Elisha Gray and Alexander Graham Bell, inventors of radio Edwin Armstrong and Lee de Forest, as well as inventors of television like Vladimir K. Zworykin, John Logie Baird and Philo Farnsworth.

Since the 1960s, the proliferation of digital technologies has meant that voice communications have gradually been supplemented by data. The physical limitations of metallic media prompted the development of optical fibre. The Internet, a technology independent of any given medium, has provided global access to services for individual users and further reduced location and time limitations on communications.

== Definition ==
Telecommunications technician splicing fiber optic cables

At the 1932 Plenipotentiary Telegraph Conference and the International Radiotelegraph Conference in Madrid, the two organizations merged to form the International Telecommunication Union (ITU). They defined telecommunication as "any telegraphic or telephonic communication of signs, signals, writing, facsimiles and sounds of any kind, by wire, wireless or other systems or processes of electric signaling or visual signaling (semaphores)."

The definition was later reconfirmed, according to Article 1.3 of the ITU Radio Regulations, which defined it as "Any transmission, emission or reception of signs, signals, writings, images and sounds or intelligence of any nature by wire, radio, optical, or other electromagnetic systems".

As such, slow communications technologies like postal mail and pneumatic tubes are excluded from the telecommunication's definition.

The term telecommunication was coined in 1904 by the French engineer and novelist Édouard Estaunié, who defined it as "remote transmission of thought through electricity". Telecommunication is a compound noun formed from the Greek prefix tele- (τῆλε), meaning distant, far off, or afar, and the Latin verb communicare, meaning to share. Communication was first used as an English word in the late 14th century. It comes from Old French comunicacion (14c., Modern French communication), from Latin communicationem (nominative communication), noun of action from past participle stem of communicare, "to share, divide out; communicate, impart, inform; join, unite, participate in," literally, "to make common", from communis.

== History ==
Many transmission media have been used for long-distance communication throughout history, from smoke signals, beacons, semaphore telegraphs, signal flags, and optical heliographs to wires and empty space made to carry electromagnetic signals.

=== Before the electrical and electronic era ===
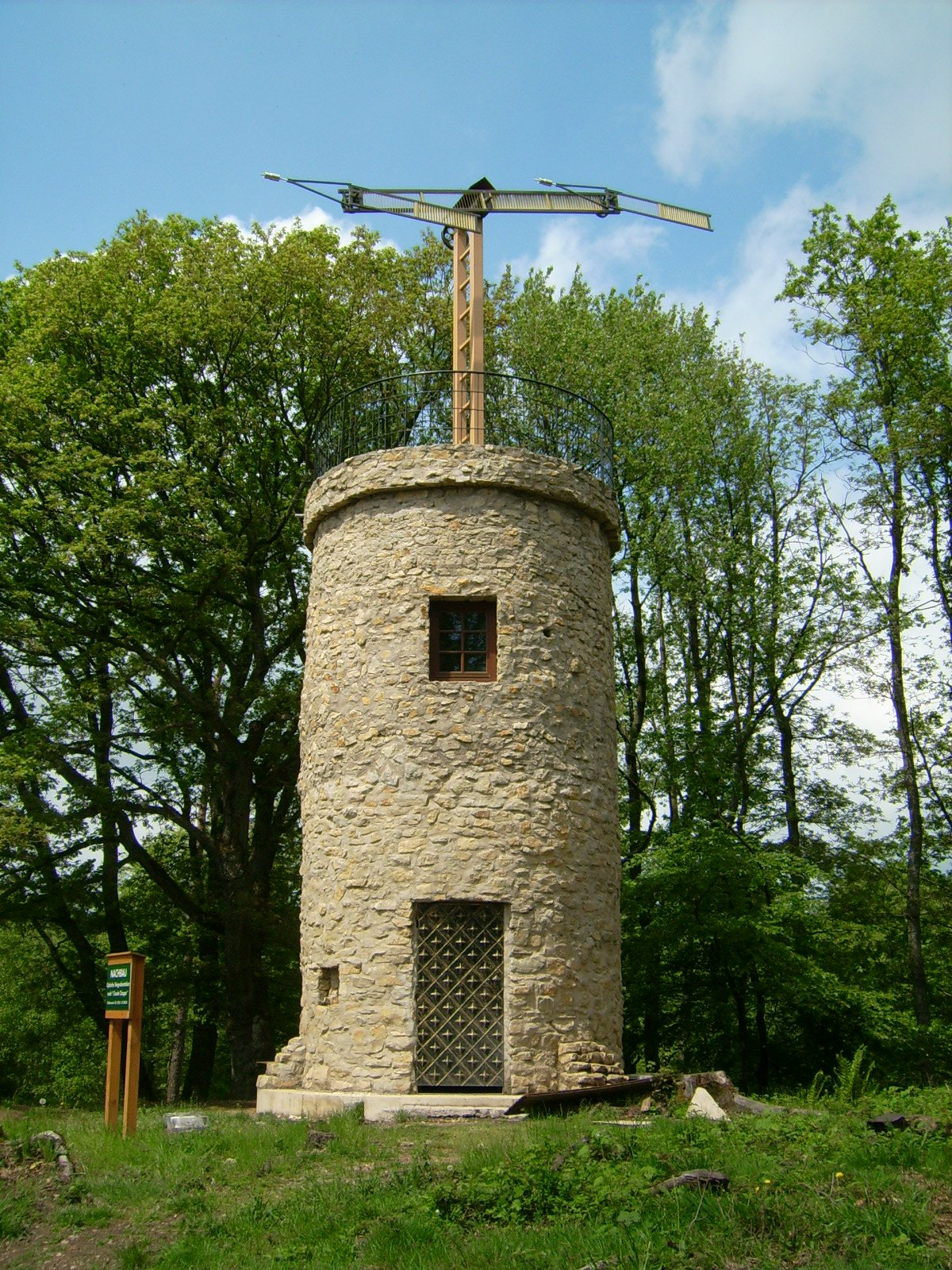
A replica of one of Chappe's semaphore towers

Long-distance communication was used long before the discovery of electricity and electromagnetism enabled the invention of telecommunications. A few of the many ingenious methods for communicating over distances prior to that are described here.

Homing pigeons have been used throughout history by different cultures. Pigeon post had origins in Ancient Persia and was later used by the Roman Empire to aid their military. Frontinus claimed Julius Caesar used pigeons as messengers in his conquest of Gaul. The Greeks also conveyed the names of the victors at the Olympic Games to various cities using homing pigeons. In the early 19th century, the Dutch government used the system in Java and Sumatra. And in 1849, Paul Julius Reuter started a pigeon service to fly stock prices between Aachen and Brussels, a service that operated for a year until the gap in the telegraph link was closed.

In the Middle Ages, chains of beacons were commonly used on hilltops as a means of relaying a signal. Beacon chains suffered the drawback that they could only pass a single bit of information, so the meaning of the message, such as "the enemy has been sighted" had to be agreed upon in advance. One notable instance of their use was during the Spanish Armada, when a beacon chain relayed a signal from Plymouth to London.

In 1792, Claude Chappe, a French engineer, built the first fixed visual telegraphy system (or semaphore line) between Lille and Paris. However semaphore suffered from the need for skilled operators and expensive towers at intervals of ten to thirty kilometres (six to nineteen miles). As a result of competition from the electrical telegraph, the last commercial line was abandoned in 1880.

=== Telegraph and telephone ===
On July 25, 1837, the first commercial electrical telegraph was demonstrated by English inventor Sir William Fothergill Cooke and English scientist Sir Charles Wheatstone. Both inventors viewed their device as "an improvement to the [existing] electromagnetic telegraph" and not as a new device.

Samuel Morse independently developed a version of the electrical telegraph that he unsuccessfully demonstrated on September 2, 1837. His code was an important advance over Wheatstone's signalling method. The first transatlantic telegraph cable was successfully completed on July 27, 1866, allowing transatlantic telecommunication for the first time.

After early attempts to develop a talking telegraph by Antonio Meucci and a telefon by Johann Philipp Reis, a patent for the conventional telephone was filed by Alexander Bell in February 1876 (just a few hours before Elisha Gray filed a patent caveat for a similar device). The first commercial telephone services were set up by the Bell Telephone Company in 1878 and 1879 on both sides of the Atlantic in the cities of New Haven and London.

=== Radio and television ===
In 1894, Italian inventor Guglielmo Marconi began developing wireless communication using the then-newly discovered phenomenon of radio waves, demonstrating, by 1901, that they could be transmitted across the Atlantic Ocean. This was the start of wireless telegraphy by radio. On 17 December 1902, a transmission from the Marconi station in Glace Bay, Nova Scotia, Canada, became the world's first radio message to cross the Atlantic from North America. In 1904, a commercial service was established to transmit nightly news summaries to subscribing ships, which incorporated them into their onboard newspapers.

World War I accelerated the development of radio for military communications. After the war, commercial radio AM broadcasting began in the 1920s and became an important mass medium for entertainment and news. World War II again accelerated the development of radio for the wartime purposes of aircraft and land communication, radio navigation, and radar. Development of stereo FM broadcasting of radio began in the 1930s in the United States and the 1940s in the United Kingdom, displacing AM as the dominant commercial standard in the 1970s.

On March 25, 1925, John Logie Baird demonstrated the transmission of moving pictures at the London department store Selfridges. Baird's device relied upon the Nipkow disk by Paul Nipkow and thus became known as the mechanical television. It formed the basis of experimental broadcasts done by the British Broadcasting Corporation beginning on 30 September 1929.

=== Vacuum tubes ===
Vacuum tubes use thermionic emission of electrons from a heated cathode for a number of fundamental electronic functions such as signal amplification and current rectification.

The simplest vacuum tube, the diode invented in 1904 by John Ambrose Fleming, contains only a heated electron-emitting cathode and an anode. Electrons can only flow in one direction through the device—from the cathode to the anode. Adding one or more control grids within the tube enables the current between the cathode and anode to be controlled by the voltage on the grid or grids. These devices became a key component of electronic circuits for the first half of the 20th century and were crucial to the development of radio, television, radar, sound recording and reproduction, long-distance telephone networks, and analogue and early digital computers. While some applications had used earlier technologies such as the spark gap transmitter for radio or mechanical computers for computing, it was the invention of the thermionic vacuum tube that made these technologies widespread and practical, leading to the creation of electronics.

For most of the 20th century, televisions depended on a kind of vacuum tube—the cathode ray tube—invented by Karl Ferdinand Braun. The first version of such a television to show promise was produced by Philo Farnsworth and demonstrated to his family on 7 September 1927. After World War II, interrupted experiments resumed and television became an important home entertainment broadcast medium.

Also in the 1940s, the invention of semiconductor devices made it possible to produce solid-state devices, which are smaller, cheaper, and more efficient, reliable, and durable than vacuum tubes. Starting in the mid-1960s, vacuum tubes were replaced with the transistor. Vacuum tubes still have some applications for certain high-frequency amplifiers.

=== Computer networks and the Internet ===
On 11 September 1940, George Stibitz transmitted problems for his Complex Number Calculator in New York using a teletype and received the computed results back at Dartmouth College in New Hampshire. This configuration of a centralized computer (mainframe) with remote dumb terminals remained popular well into the 1970s. In the 1960s, Paul Baran and, independently, Donald Davies started to investigate packet switching, a technology that sends a message in portions to its destination asynchronously without passing it through a centralized mainframe. A four-node network emerged on 5 December 1969, constituting the beginnings of the ARPANET, which by 1981 had grown to 213 nodes. ARPANET eventually merged with other networks to form the Internet. While Internet development was a focus of the Internet Engineering Task Force (IETF) who published a series of Request for Comments documents, other networking advancements occurred in industrial laboratories, such as the local area network (LAN) developments of Ethernet (1983), Token Ring (1984) and Star network topology.

=== Growth of transmission capacity ===
The effective capacity to exchange information worldwide through two-way telecommunication networks grew from 281 petabytes (PB) of optimally compressed information in 1986 to 471 PB in 1993 to 2.2 exabytes (EB) in 2000 to 65 EB in 2007. This is the informational equivalent of two newspaper pages per person per day in 1986, and six entire newspapers per person per day by 2007. Given this growth, telecommunications play an increasingly important role in the world economy and the global telecommunications industry was about a $4.7 trillion sector in 2012. The service revenue of the global telecommunications industry was estimated to be $1.5 trillion in 2010, corresponding to 2.4% of the world's gross domestic product (GDP).

== Technical concepts ==
Modern telecommunication is founded on a series of key concepts that experienced progressive development and refinement in a period of well over a century:

=== Basic elements ===
Telecommunication technologies may primarily be divided into wired and wireless methods. Overall, a basic telecommunication system consists of three main parts that are always present in some form or another:

- A transmitter that takes information and converts it to a signal
- A transmission medium, also called the physical channel, that carries the signal (e.g., the "free space channel")
- A receiver that takes the signal from the channel and converts it back into usable information for the recipient

In a radio broadcasting station, the station's large power amplifier is the transmitter, and the broadcasting antenna is the interface between the power amplifier and the free space channel. The free space channel is the transmission medium, and the receiver's antenna is the interface between the free space channel and the receiver. Next, the radio receiver is the destination of the radio signal, where it is converted from electricity to sound.

Telecommunication systems are occasionally "duplex" (two-way systems) with a single box of electronics working as both the transmitter and a receiver, or a transceiver (e.g., a mobile phone). The transmission electronics and the receiver electronics within a transceiver are quite independent of one another. This can be explained by the fact that radio transmitters contain power amplifiers that operate with electrical powers measured in watts or kilowatts, but radio receivers deal with radio powers measured in microwatts or nanowatts. Hence, transceivers have to be carefully designed and built to isolate their high-power circuitry and their low-power circuitry from each other to avoid interference.

Telecommunication over fixed lines is called point-to-point communication because it occurs between a transmitter and a receiver. Telecommunication through radio broadcasts is called broadcast communication because it occurs between a powerful transmitter and numerous low-power but sensitive radio receivers.

Telecommunications in which multiple transmitters and multiple receivers have been designed to cooperate and share the same physical channel are called multiplex systems. The sharing of physical channels using multiplexing often results in significant cost reduction. Multiplexed systems are laid out in telecommunication networks and multiplexed signals are switched at nodes to reach the correct destination terminal receiver.

=== Analogue versus digital communications ===
Communications can be encoded as analogue or digital signals, which may in turn be carried by analogue or digital communication systems. Analogue signals vary continuously with respect to the information, while digital signals encode information as a set of discrete values (e.g., a set of ones and zeroes). During propagation and reception, information contained in analogue signals is degraded by undesirable noise. Commonly, the noise in a communication system can be expressed as adding or subtracting from the desirable signal via a random process. This form of noise is called additive noise, with the understanding that the noise can be negative or positive at different instances.

Unless the additive noise disturbance exceeds a certain threshold, the information contained in digital signals will remain intact. Their resistance to noise represents a key advantage of digital signals over analogue signals. However, digital systems fail catastrophically when noise exceeds the system's ability to autocorrect. On the other hand, analogue systems fail gracefully: as noise increases, the signal becomes progressively more degraded but still usable. Also, digital transmission of continuous data unavoidably adds quantization noise to the output. This can be reduced, but not eliminated, only at the expense of increasing the channel bandwidth requirement.

=== Communication channels ===
The term channel has two different meanings. In one meaning, a channel is the physical medium that carries a signal between the transmitter and the receiver. Examples of this include the atmosphere for sound communications, glass optical fibres for some kinds of optical communications, coaxial cables for communications by way of the voltages and electric currents in them, and free space for communications using visible light, infrared waves, ultraviolet light, and radio waves. Coaxial cable types are classified by RG type or radio guide, terminology derived from World War II. The various RG designations are used to classify the specific signal transmission applications. This last channel is called the free space channel. The sending of radio waves from one place to another has nothing to do with the presence or absence of an atmosphere between the two. Radio waves travel through a perfect vacuum just as easily as they travel through air, fog, clouds, or any other kind of gas.

The other meaning of the term channel in telecommunications is seen in the phrase communications channel, which is a subdivision of a transmission medium so that it can be used to send multiple streams of information simultaneously. For example, one radio station can broadcast radio waves into free space at frequencies in the neighbourhood of 94.5 MHz (megahertz) while another radio station can simultaneously broadcast radio waves at frequencies in the neighbourhood of 96.1 MHz. Each radio station would transmit radio waves over a frequency bandwidth of about 180 kHz (kilohertz), centred at frequencies such as the above, which are called the "carrier frequencies". Each station in this example is separated from its adjacent stations by 200 kHz, and the difference between 200 kHz and 180 kHz (20 kHz) is an engineering allowance for the imperfections in the communication system.

In the example above, the free space channel has been divided into communications channels according to frequencies, and each channel is assigned a separate frequency bandwidth in which to broadcast radio waves. This system of dividing the medium into channels according to frequency is called frequency-division multiplexing. Another term for the same concept is wavelength-division multiplexing, which is more commonly used in optical communications when multiple transmitters share the same physical medium.

Another way of dividing a communications medium into channels is to allocate each sender a recurring segment of time (a time slot, for example, 20 milliseconds out of each second), and to allow each sender to send messages only within its own time slot. This method of dividing the medium into communication channels is called time-division multiplexing (TDM), and is used in optical fibre communication. Some radio communication systems use TDM within an allocated FDM channel. Hence, these systems use a hybrid of TDM and FDM.

=== Modulation ===
The shaping of a signal to convey information is known as modulation. Modulation can be used to represent a digital message as an analogue waveform. This is commonly called "keying"—a term derived from the older use of Morse Code in telecommunications—and several keying techniques exist (these include phase-shift keying, frequency-shift keying, and amplitude-shift keying). The Bluetooth system, for example, uses phase-shift keying to exchange information between various devices. In addition, there are combinations of phase-shift keying and amplitude-shift keying, which is called (in the jargon of the field) quadrature amplitude modulation (QAM) that are used in high-capacity digital radio communication systems.

Modulation can also be used to transmit the information of low-frequency analogue signals at higher frequencies. This is helpful because low-frequency analogue signals cannot be effectively transmitted over free space. Hence, the information from a low-frequency analogue signal must be impressed into a higher-frequency signal (known as the carrier wave) before transmission. There are several different modulation schemes available to achieve this [two of the most basic being amplitude modulation (AM) and frequency modulation (FM)]. An example of this process is a disc jockey's voice being impressed into a 96 MHz carrier wave using frequency modulation (the voice would then be received on a radio as the channel 96 FM). In addition, modulation has the advantage that it may use frequency division multiplexing (FDM).

=== Telecommunication networks ===
A telecommunications network is a collection of transmitters, receivers, and communications channels that send messages to one another. Some digital communications networks contain one or more routers that work together to transmit information to the correct user. An analogue communications network consists of one or more switches that establish a connection between two or more users. For both types of networks, repeaters may be necessary to amplify or recreate the signal when it is being transmitted over long distances. This is to combat attenuation that can render the signal indistinguishable from the noise. Another advantage of digital systems over analogue is that their output is easier to store in memory, i.e., two voltage states (high and low) are easier to store than a continuous range of states.

== Societal impact ==
Telecommunication has a significant social, cultural and economic impact on modern society. In 2008, estimates placed the telecommunication industry's revenue at US$4.7 trillion or just under three per cent of the gross world product (official exchange rate). Several of the following sections discuss the impact of telecommunication on society.

=== Microeconomics ===
On the microeconomic scale, companies have used telecommunications to help build global business empires. This is self-evident in the case of online retailer Amazon.com but, according to academic Edward Lenert, even the conventional retailer Walmart has benefited from better telecommunication infrastructure compared to its competitors. In cities throughout the world, home owners use their telephones to order and arrange a variety of home services ranging from pizza deliveries to electricians. Even relatively poor communities have been noted to use telecommunication to their advantage. In Bangladesh's Narsingdi District, isolated villagers use cellular phones to speak directly to wholesalers and arrange a better price for their goods. In Côte d'Ivoire, coffee growers share mobile phones to follow hourly variations in coffee prices and sell at the best price.

=== Macroeconomics ===
On the macroeconomic scale, Lars-Hendrik Röller and Leonard Waverman suggested a causal link between good telecommunication infrastructure and economic growth. Few dispute the existence of a correlation although some argue it is wrong to view the relationship as causal.

Because of the economic benefits of good telecommunication infrastructure, there is increasing worry about the inequitable access to telecommunication services amongst various countries of the world—this is known as the digital divide. A 2003 survey by the International Telecommunication Union (ITU) revealed that roughly a third of countries have fewer than one mobile subscription for every 20 people and one-third of countries have fewer than one land-line telephone subscription for every 20 people. In terms of Internet access, roughly half of all countries have fewer than one out of 20 people with Internet access. From this information, as well as educational data, the ITU was able to compile an index that measures the overall ability of citizens to access and use information and communication technologies. Using this measure, Sweden, Denmark and Iceland received the highest ranking while the African countries Niger, Burkina Faso and Mali received the lowest.

=== Social impact ===
Telecommunication has played a significant role in social relationships. Nevertheless, devices like the telephone system were originally advertised with an emphasis on the practical dimensions of the device (such as the ability to conduct business or order home services) as opposed to the social dimensions. It was not until the late 1920s and 1930s that the social dimensions of the device became a prominent theme in telephone advertisements. New promotions started appealing to consumers' emotions, stressing the importance of social conversations and staying connected to family and friends.

Since then, the role that telecommunications have played in social relations has become increasingly important. In recent years, the popularity of social networking sites has increased dramatically. These sites allow users to communicate with each other as well as post photographs, events and profiles for others to see. The profiles can list a person's age, interests, sexual preference and relationship status. In this way, these sites can play an important role in everything from organising social engagements to courtship.

Prior to social networking sites, technologies like short message service (SMS) and the telephone also had a significant impact on social interactions. In 2000, market research group Ipsos MORI reported that 81% of 15- to 24-year-old SMS users in the United Kingdom had used the service to coordinate social arrangements and 42% to flirt.

=== Entertainment, news, and advertising ===
News source preference of Americans in 2006.
Local TV	59%
National TV	47%
Radio	44%
Local paper	38%
Internet	23%
National paper	12%
Survey permitted multiple answers

In cultural terms, telecommunication has increased the public's ability to access music and film. With television, people can watch films they have not seen before in their own home without having to travel to the video store or cinema. With radio and the Internet, people can listen to music they have not heard before without having to travel to the music store.

Telecommunication has also transformed the way people receive their news. A 2006 survey (right table) of slightly more than 3,000 Americans by the non-profit Pew Internet and American Life Project in the United States the majority specified television or radio over newspapers.

Telecommunication has had an equally significant impact on advertising. TNS Media Intelligence reported that in 2007, 58% of advertising expenditure in the United States was spent on media that depend upon telecommunication.

Advertising expenditures in US in 2007
Medium		Spending
Internet	7.6%	$11.31 billion
Radio	7.2%	$10.69 billion
Cable TV	12.1%	$18.02 billion
Syndicated TV	2.8%	$4.17 billion
Spot TV	11.3%	$16.82 billion
Network TV	17.1%	$25.42 billion
Newspaper	18.9%	$28.22 billion
Magazine	20.4%	$30.33 billion
Outdoor	2.7%	$4.02 billion
Total	100%	$149 billion

== Regulation ==
Many countries have enacted legislation which conforms to the International Telecommunication Regulations established by the International Telecommunication Union (ITU), which is the "leading UN agency for information and communication technology issues". In 1947, at the Atlantic City Conference, the ITU decided to "afford international protection to all frequencies registered in a new international frequency list and used in conformity with the Radio Regulation". According to the ITU's Radio Regulations adopted in Atlantic City, all frequencies referenced in the International Frequency Registration Board, examined by the board and registered on the International Frequency List "shall have the right to international protection from harmful interference".

From a global perspective, there have been political debates and legislation regarding the management of telecommunication and broadcasting. The history of broadcasting discusses some debates in relation to balancing conventional communication such as printing and telecommunication such as radio broadcasting. The onset of World War II brought on the first explosion of international broadcasting propaganda. Countries, their governments, insurgents, terrorists, and militiamen have all used telecommunication and broadcasting techniques to promote propaganda. Patriotic propaganda for political movements and colonization started the mid-1930s. In 1936, the BBC broadcast propaganda to the Arab World to partly counter similar broadcasts from Italy, which also had colonial interests in North Africa. Modern political debates in telecommunication include the reclassification of broadband Internet service as a telecommunications service (also called net neutrality), regulation of phone spam, and expanding affordable broadband access.

== Modern media ==
=== Worldwide equipment sales ===
According to data collected by Gartner and Ars Technica sales of main consumer's telecommunication equipment worldwide in millions of units was:

Equipment / year	1975	1980	1985	1990	1994	1996	1998	2000	2002	2004	2006	2008
Computers	0	1	8	20	40	75	100	135	130	175	230	280
Cell phones	N/A	N/A	N/A	N/A	N/A	N/A	180	400	420	660	830	1000

=== Telephone ===
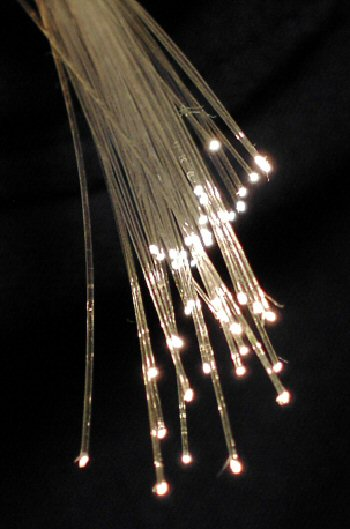
Optical fibre provides cheaper bandwidth for long-distance communication.

In a telephone network, the caller is connected to the person to whom they wish to talk by switches at various telephone exchanges. The switches form an electrical connection between the two users, and the setting of these switches is determined electronically when the caller dials the number. Once the connection is made, the caller's voice is transformed to an electrical signal using a small microphone in the caller's handset. This electrical signal is then sent through the network to the user at the other end, where it is transformed back into sound by a small speaker in that person's handset.

As of 2015, the landline telephones in most residential homes are analogue—that is, the speaker's voice directly determines the signal's voltage. Although short-distance calls may be handled from end-to-end as analogue signals, increasingly telephone service providers are transparently converting the signals to digital signals for transmission. The advantage of this is that digitized voice data can travel side by side with data from the Internet and can be perfectly reproduced in long-distance communication (as opposed to analogue signals that are inevitably impacted by noise).

Mobile phones have had a significant impact on telephone networks. Mobile phone subscriptions now outnumber fixed-line subscriptions in many markets. Sales of mobile phones in 2005 totalled 816.6 million with that figure being almost equally shared amongst the markets of Asia/Pacific (204 m), Western Europe (164 m), CEMEA (Central Europe, the Middle East and Africa) (153.5 m), North America (148 m) and Latin America (102 m). In terms of new subscriptions over the five years from 1999, Africa has outpaced other markets with 58.2% growth. Increasingly these phones are being serviced by systems where the voice content is transmitted digitally such as GSM or W-CDMA with many markets choosing to deprecate analog systems such as AMPS.

There have also been dramatic changes in telephone communication behind the scenes. Starting with the operation of TAT-8 in 1988, the 1990s saw the widespread adoption of systems based on optical fibres. The benefit of communicating with optical fibres is that they offer a drastic increase in data capacity. TAT-8 itself was able to carry 10 times as many telephone calls as the last copper cable laid at that time and today's optical fibre cables are able to carry 25 times as many telephone calls as TAT-8. This increase in data capacity is due to several factors: First, optical fibres are physically much smaller than competing technologies. Second, they do not suffer from crosstalk, which means several hundred of them can be easily bundled together in a single cable. Lastly, improvements in multiplexing have led to an exponential growth in the data capacity of a single fibre.

Assisting communication across many modern optical fibre networks is a protocol known as Asynchronous Transfer Mode (ATM). The ATM protocol allows for the side-by-side data transmission mentioned in the second paragraph. It is suitable for public telephone networks because it establishes a pathway for data through the network and associates a traffic contract with that pathway. The traffic contract is essentially an agreement between the client and the network about how the network is to handle the data; if the network cannot meet the conditions of the traffic contract, it does not accept the connection. This is important because telephone calls can negotiate a contract so as to guarantee themselves a constant bit rate, something that will ensure a caller's voice is not delayed in parts or cut off completely. There are competitors to ATM, such as Multiprotocol Label Switching (MPLS), that perform a similar task and are expected to supplant ATM in the future.

=== Radio and television ===
Digital television standards and their adoption worldwide

In a broadcast system, the central high-powered broadcast tower transmits a high-frequency electromagnetic wave to numerous low-powered receivers. The high-frequency wave sent by the tower is modulated with a signal containing visual or audio information. The receiver is then tuned so as to pick up the high-frequency wave and a demodulator is used to retrieve the signal containing the visual or audio information. The broadcast signal can be either analogue (signal is varied continuously with respect to the information) or digital (information is encoded as a set of discrete values).

The broadcast media industry is at a critical turning point in its development, with many countries moving from analogue to digital broadcasts. This move is made possible by the production of cheaper, faster and more capable integrated circuits. The chief advantage of digital broadcasts is that they prevent a number of complaints common to traditional analogue broadcasts. For television, this includes the elimination of problems such as snowy pictures, ghosting and other distortions. These occur because of the nature of analogue transmission, which means that perturbations due to noise will be evident in the final output. Digital transmission overcomes this problem because digital signals are reduced to discrete values upon reception and hence small perturbations do not affect the final output. In a simplified example, if a binary message 1011 was transmitted with signal amplitudes [1.0 0.0 1.0 1.0] and received with signal amplitudes [0.9 0.2 1.1 0.9] it would still decode to the binary message 1011— a perfect reproduction of what was sent. From this example, a problem with digital transmissions can also be seen in that if the noise is great enough, it can significantly alter the decoded message. Using forward error correction a receiver can correct a handful of bit errors in the resulting message but too much noise will lead to incomprehensible output and hence a breakdown of the transmission.

In digital television broadcasting, there are three competing standards that are likely to be adopted worldwide. These are the ATSC, DVB and ISDB standards; the adoption of these standards thus far is presented in the captioned map. All three standards use MPEG-2 for video compression. ATSC uses Dolby Digital AC-3 for audio compression, ISDB uses Advanced Audio Coding (MPEG-2 Part 7) and DVB has no standard for audio compression but typically uses MPEG-1 Part 3 Layer 2. The choice of modulation also varies between the schemes. In digital audio broadcasting, standards are much more unified, with practically all countries choosing to adopt the Digital Audio Broadcasting standard (also known as the Eureka 147 standard). The exception is the United States, which has chosen to adopt HD Radio. HD Radio, unlike Eureka 147, is based upon a transmission method known as in-band on-channel transmission that allows digital information to piggyback on normal AM or FM analog transmissions.

However, despite the pending switch to digital, analog television remains being transmitted in most countries. An exception is the United States that ended analog television transmission (by all but the very low-power TV stations) on 12 June 2009 after twice delaying the switchover deadline. Kenya also ended analog television transmission in December 2014 after multiple delays. For analogue television, there were three standards in use for broadcasting colour TV (see a map on adoption here). These are known as PAL (German designed), NTSC (American designed), and SECAM (French designed). For analogue radio, the switch to digital radio is made more difficult by the higher cost of digital receivers. The choice of modulation for analogue radio is typically between amplitude (AM) or frequency modulation (FM). To achieve stereo playback, an amplitude modulated subcarrier is used for stereo FM, and quadrature amplitude modulation is used for stereo AM or C-QUAM.

=== Internet ===
The OSI reference model

The Internet is a worldwide network of computers and computer networks that communicate with each other using the Internet Protocol (IP). Any computer on the Internet has a unique IP address that can be used by other computers to route information to it. Hence, any computer on the Internet can send a message to any other computer using its IP address. These messages carry with them the originating computer's IP address allowing for two-way communication. The Internet is thus an exchange of messages between computers.

It is estimated that 51% of the information flowing through two-way telecommunications networks in the year 2000 was flowing through the Internet (most of the rest (42%) through the landline telephone). By 2007 the Internet clearly dominated and captured 97% of all the information in telecommunication networks (most of the rest (2%) through mobile phones). As of 2008, an estimated 21.9% of the world population has access to the Internet with the highest access rates (measured as a percentage of the population) in North America (73.6%), Oceania/Australia (59.5%) and Europe (48.1%). In terms of broadband access, Iceland (26.7%), South Korea (25.4%) and the Netherlands (25.3%) led the world.

The Internet works in part because of protocols that govern how the computers and routers communicate with each other. The nature of computer network communication lends itself to a layered approach where individual protocols in the protocol stack run more-or-less independently of other protocols. This allows lower-level protocols to be customized for the network situation while not changing the way higher-level protocols operate. A practical example of why this is important is that it allows a web browser to run the same code regardless of whether the computer it is running on is connected to the Internet through an Ethernet or Wi-Fi connection. Protocols are often talked about in terms of their place in the OSI reference model (pictured on the right), which emerged in 1983 as the first step in an unsuccessful attempt to build a universally adopted networking protocol suite.

For the Internet, the physical medium and data link protocol can vary several times as packets traverse the globe. This is because the Internet places no constraints on what physical medium or data link protocol is used. This leads to the adoption of media and protocols that best suit the local network situation. In practice, most intercontinental communication will use the Asynchronous Transfer Mode (ATM) protocol (or a modern equivalent) on top of optical fibre. This is because for most intercontinental communication, the Internet shares the same infrastructure as the public switched telephone network.

At the network layer, things become standardized with the Internet Protocol (IP) being adopted for logical addressing. For the World Wide Web, these IP addresses are derived from the human-readable form using the Domain Name System (e.g., 72.14.207.99 is derived from Google). At the moment, the most widely used version of the Internet Protocol is version four but a move to version six is imminent.

At the transport layer, most communication adopts either the Transmission Control Protocol (TCP) or the User Datagram Protocol (UDP). TCP is used when it is essential that every message sent is received by the other computer, whereas UDP is used when it is merely desirable. With TCP, packets are retransmitted if they are lost and placed in order before they are presented to higher layers. With UDP, packets are not ordered nor retransmitted if lost. Both TCP and UDP packets carry port numbers with them to specify what application or process the packet should be handled by. Because certain application-level protocols use certain ports, network administrators can manipulate traffic to suit particular requirements. Examples are to restrict Internet access by blocking the traffic destined for a particular port or to affect the performance of certain applications by assigning priority.

Above the transport layer, there are certain protocols that are sometimes used and loosely fit in the session and presentation layers, most notably the Secure Sockets Layer (SSL) and Transport Layer Security (TLS) protocols. These protocols ensure that data transferred between two parties remains completely confidential. Finally, at the application layer, are many of the protocols Internet users would be familiar with such as HTTP (web browsing), POP3 (e-mail), FTP (file transfer), IRC (Internet chat), BitTorrent (file sharing) and XMPP (instant messaging).

Voice over Internet Protocol (VoIP) allows data packets to be used for synchronous voice communications. The data packets are marked as voice-type packets and can be prioritized by the network administrators so that the real-time, synchronous conversation is less subject to contention with other types of data traffic which can be delayed (i.e., file transfer or email) or buffered in advance (i.e., audio and video) without detriment. That prioritization is fine when the network has sufficient capacity for all the VoIP calls taking place at the same time and the network is enabled for prioritization, i.e., a private corporate-style network, but the Internet is not generally managed in this way and so there can be a big difference in the quality of VoIP calls over a private network and over the public Internet.

=== Local area networks and wide area networks ===
Despite the growth of the Internet, the characteristics of local area networks (LANs)—computer networks that do not extend beyond a few kilometres—remain distinct. This is because networks on this scale do not require all the features associated with larger networks and are often more cost-effective and efficient without them. When they are not connected with the Internet, they also have the advantages of privacy and security. However, purposefully lacking a direct connection to the Internet does not provide assured protection from hackers, military forces, or economic powers. These threats exist if there are any methods for connecting remotely to the LAN.

Wide area networks (WANs) are private computer networks that may extend for thousands of kilometres. Once again, some of their advantages include privacy and security. Prime users of private LANs and WANs include armed forces and intelligence agencies that must keep their information secure and secret.

In the mid-1980s, several sets of communication protocols emerged to fill the gaps between the data-link layer and the application layer of the OSI reference model. These included AppleTalk, IPX, and NetBIOS, with the dominant protocol set during the early 1990s being IPX due to its popularity with MS-DOS users. TCP/IP existed at this point, but it was typically only used by large government and research facilities.

As the Internet grew in popularity and its traffic was required to be routed into private networks, the TCP/IP protocols replaced existing local area network technologies. Additional technologies, such as DHCP, allowed TCP/IP-based computers to self-configure in the network. Such functions also existed in the AppleTalk/ IPX/ NetBIOS protocol sets.

Whereas Asynchronous Transfer Mode (ATM) or Multiprotocol Label Switching (MPLS) are typical data-link protocols for larger networks such as WANs; Ethernet and Token Ring are typical data-link protocols for LANs. These protocols differ from the former protocols in that they are simpler, e.g., they omit features such as quality of service guarantees, and offer medium access control. Both of these differences allow for more economical systems.

Despite the modest popularity of Token Ring in the 1980s and 1990s, virtually all LANs now use either wired or wireless Ethernet facilities. At the physical layer, most wired Ethernet implementations use copper twisted-pair cables (including the common 10BASE-T networks). However, some early implementations used heavier coaxial cables and some recent implementations (especially high-speed ones) use optical fibres. When optic fibres are used, the distinction must be made between multimode fibres and single-mode fibres. Multimode fibres can be thought of as thicker optical fibres that are cheaper to manufacture devices for, but that suffer from less usable bandwidth and worse attenuation—implying poorer long-distance performance.

== See also ==
- Active networking
- Cell site
- Control communications
- Digital Revolution
- Information Age
- Institute of Telecommunications Professionals
- International Teletraffic Congress
- List of telecommunications encryption terms
- Military communication
- Nanonetwork
- New media
- Outline of telecommunication
- Telecommunications engineering
- Telecommunications Industry Association
- Telecoms resilience
- Telemetry
- Underwater acoustic communication
- Wavelength-division multiplexing
- Wired communication
