= Lie-Liang Yang =

Chinese-born electronics researcher

- Education: Beijing Jiaotong University
- Awards: Fellow of IEEE; Fellow of IET; Fellow of AAIA; Fellow of AIIA; IEEE VTS distinguished lecturer
- Scientific career
- Fields: Wireless communications Molecular communication Signal processing
- Workplaces: University of Southampton

Lie-Liang Yang (Chinese: 杨列亮, spelled as Yang Lieliang) is an electronics engineer, researcher and educator, specializing in communications engineering and signal processing. He is the professor of wireless communications in the School of Electronics and Computer Science, at the University of Southampton, UK, and a Chartered engineer (UK).

== Education ==
He received his Master of Engineering and Doctor of Philosophy degrees in communications and electronics from (Northern) Beijing Jiaotong University, Beijing, China, in 1991 and 1997, respectively, and his Bachelor of Engineering degree in communications engineering from Shanghai Railway Institute (named Shanghai Tiedao University in 1995 and then merged with Tongji University in 2000), Shanghai, China, in 1988.

== Career ==
From June 1997 to December 1997, he was a visiting scientist to the Institute of Radio Engineering and Electronics, Academy of Sciences of the Czech Republic. In December 1997, he joined the School of Electronics and Computer Science, University of Southampton, UK, as a visiting research fellow, supported by the Sino-British Post-doctoral Fellowship of the British Royal Society. In January 1999, he was employed as a Postdoctoral Research Fellow and in October 2021, promoted to a Senior Research Fellow, funded by the Engineering and Physical Sciences Research Council (EPSRC) projects. He was appointed as a Lecturer of the University of Southampton in September 2002, promoted to a Reader in March 2006, and appointed to the Professor of Wireless Communications in June 2010.

== Awards ==
He was named Fellow of the Institute of Engineering and Technology (IET), UK, in 2011, Fellow of the Institute of Electrical and Electronics Engineers (IEEE), USA, in 2016 for contributions to multicarrier communications and wireless transceivers, Fellow of Asia-Pacific Artificial Intelligence Association (AAIA), Hong Kong, China, in 2023, and Fellow of International Artificial Intelligence Industry Alliance (AIIA), Hong Kong, China, in 2024. He was a distinguished lecturer of the IEEE Vehicular Technology Society in 2016-2017. He received the 2025 IEEE ComSoc Radio Communications Committee (RCC) Technical Recognition Award, in recognition of his contributions to multicarrier communications and CDMA.

== Research publications and books ==
He has conducted research in wireless communications, wireless networks, signal processing for wireless communications, and molecular communication. He has authored/co-authored four research monographs, and published more than ten book chapters and more than 500 research articles. His newly authored book chapters and authored/co-authored books are:

- Lie-Liang Yang. "Doppler Effect: Analyses and Applications in Wireless Sensing and Communications" (book chapter), Feb. 2026
- Lie-Liang Yang, Jia Shi, Kai-Ten Feng, Li-Hsiang Shen, Sau-Hsuan Wu, Ta-Sung Lee. Resource Optimization in Wireless Communications: Fundamentals, Algorithms, and Applications (Academic Press; 2025), ISBN 978-0443300929
- Lajos Hanzo, Robert G. Maunder, Jin Wang, Lie-Liang Yang. Near-Capacity Variable-Length Coding (Wiley; 2010), ISBN 978-0470665206
- Lie-Liang Yang. Multicarrier Communications (Wiley; 2009), ISBN 0470722002
- L. Hanzo, L-L. Yang, E.L. Kuan, K. Yen. Single- and Multi-Carrier DS-CDMA: Multi-USer Detection, Space-Time Spreading, Synchronisation, Standards and Networking (Wiley; 2003), ISBN 0-470-86309-9
