= W. David Sincoskie =

American computer scientist

- Born: December 21, 1954
- Died: October 20, 2010 (aged 55)
- Education: University of Delaware
- Known for: Virtual LAN; ATM; Packet switching Active networking
- Awards: IEEE's Fred W. Ellersick Prize
- Scientific career
- Fields: Computer Engineering
- Workplaces: Bell Labs; Bellcore; Telcordia Technologies; University of Delaware
- Doctoral advisor: Dave Farber

Walter David "Dave" Sincoskie (December 21, 1954 – October 20, 2010) was an American computer engineer. Sincoskie installed the first Ethernet local area network at Bellcore, and helped invent voice over IP technology. Sincoskie authored the first local ATM specification. He is also the inventor of the VLAN.

== Education ==
Sincoskie received the bachelor's degree, master's degree, and Ph.D in Electrical Engineering from the University of Delaware. His doctoral adviser was Dave Farber.

== Career ==
Sincoskie worked for Bell Laboratories in Murray Hill from 1980 to 1983. In 1984 he moved to the newly formed Bellcore, where he was District Manager of the Computer Communications Research group for the first few years. During this time, Sincoskie worked on Internet telephony and as a result developed what is now known today as the VLAN.

From 1986 to 1990, he managed the Packet Communications Research Department, which spearheaded the telecommunications transition from circuit-switching to packet-switching, a key factor in the successful commercialization of the Internet. Sincoskie also co-authored the first specifications for Local ATM, which were later adopted by the ATM Forum.

From 1990 to 1996, Sincoskie was Executive Director of the Computer Networking Research Department at Telcordia. He managed a group working on the AURORA gigabit testbed, IPv6, IP over ATM, NSFNET, and broadband service control. He was the Project Director for two operational NSFNET Network Access Points, Chicago and San Francisco, which today interconnect approximately 150 Internet service providers.

From 1996 to 2008, he was senior vice president of Telcordia Technologies's Networking Systems Laboratory where, among other achievements, he pioneered the creation of Internet telephony. In 2008, Sincoskie left Telcordia and joined the faculty at the University of Delaware's Electrical and Computer Engineering Department as a full professor. At UD, he formed and served as Director to the Center for Information and Communication Sciences, jump starting the cyber security research effort at the institution.

Sincoskie's record of service to the DoD, Army, and the National Academies included the National Academies Board on Army Science and Technologies (BAST), the Army Lab Assessment Group, DARPA’s Information Sciences and Technology (ISAT) group, and five National Research Council panels.

== Death ==
On October 20, 2010, Sincoskie died of Idiopathic pulmonary fibrosis while being treated at Johns Hopkins Hospital in Baltimore, MD.

== Awards ==
Sincoskie was elected to the National Academy of Engineering in 2000. He was also an IEEE Fellow for contribution and innovations in fast packet switching, leading to the development of an international broad-band information infrastructure and received the IEEE's Fred W. Ellersick Prize (2003) for his paper, “Broadband Packet Switching: A Personal Perspective,” which detailed his research contributions over two decades to the development of broadband Internet. He was a member of Tau Beta Pi and Eta Kappa Nu. Sincoskie is also credited with many patents and numerous papers. He was elected to the UD Alumni Wall of Fame in 2006.
