= Jiang Xie =

Telecommunications engineer

Jiang (Linda) Xie is a Chinese and American telecommunications engineer specializing in wireless ad hoc networks, cognitive radio networks, mobile computing, cloud computing, and edge computing.

== Education and career ==
Xie graduated from Tsinghua University in 1997 and earned a master's degree from Hong Kong University of Science and Technology in 1999. Continuing her graduate studies in electrical and computer engineering at Georgia Tech, she earned a second master's degree in 2002 and completed her Ph.D. in 2004. Her dissertation, Mobility Management in Next-Generation All-IP-Based Wireless Systems, was supervised by Ian F. Akyildiz.

She became an assistant professor of electrical and computer engineering at the University of North Carolina at Charlotte in 2004, and is currently a full professor there.

== Recognition ==
Xie was named an IEEE Fellow, in the 2020 class of fellows, "for contributions to mobility and resource management of wireless networks".
