= David J. Farber =

American computer scientist in Japan (1934–2026)

David Jack Farber
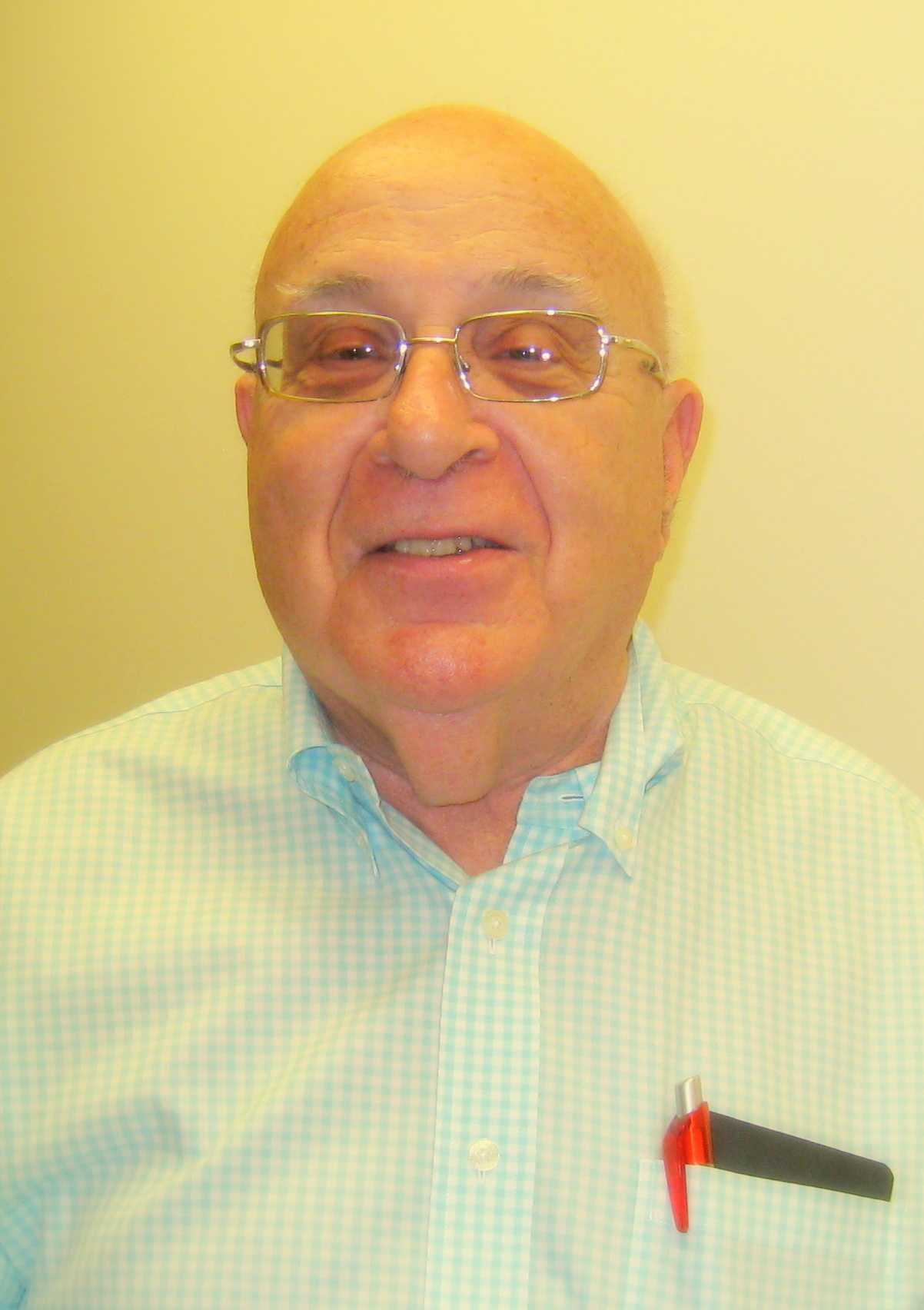
- Farber in 2008
- Born: April 17, 1934; Jersey City, New Jersey, U.S.
- Died: February 7, 2026 (aged 91); Tokyo, Japan
- Education: Stevens Institute of Technology
- Scientific career
- Fields: Computer science
- Workplaces: Bell Labs; RAND Corporation; Scientific Data Systems; University of California, Irvine; University of Delaware; Heinz College; Carnegie Mellon University; University of Pennsylvania; Keio University
- Doctoral students: Jon Postel, Dave Sincoskie, Marshall Rose, Paul Mockapetris

David Jack Farber (April 17, 1934 – February 7, 2026) was an American professor of computer science, noted for his major contributions to programming languages and computer networking and was a distinguished professor and co-director of Cyber Civilization Research Center at Keio University in Japan. Farber was widely known as a mentor who maintained a global list of contacts in the high technology field, often connecting people with problems that needed solving.

== Life and career ==
Farber was born in Jersey City, New Jersey, on April 17, 1934. From an early age, encouraged by his father, Farber tinkered with electronics, building radio sets from kits. He graduated from the Stevens Institute of Technology with a B.E. degree in electrical engineering in 1956 and a M.S. degree in mathematics in 1961. He then began an 11-year career at Bell Laboratories, where he helped design the first electronic switching system (ESS-1) and the SNOBOL programming languages. He subsequently held industry positions at the Rand Corporation and Scientific Data Systems, followed by academic positions at the University of California, Irvine, the University of Delaware, and Carnegie Mellon University. He was awarded an honorary doctorate in engineering from the Stevens Institute in 1999.

At Irvine his research work was focused on creating the world's first operational distributed computer system. While a member of the electrical engineering department of the University of Delaware, he helped conceive and organize the major American research networks CSNET, NSFNet, and the National Research and Education Network (NREN). He helped create the NSF/DARPA-funded Gigabit Network Test bed Initiative and served as the Chairman of the Gigabit Test bed Coordinating Committee.

Farber subsequently was appointed Alfred Fitler Moore Professor of Telecommunication Systems at the University of Pennsylvania, where he also held appointments as professor of business and public policy at the Wharton School of Business, and as a faculty associate of the Annenberg School for Communication. Farber served as chief technologist at the US Federal Communications Commission (2000–2001) while on leave from the university. In 2018, he moved to Japan to become Distinguished Professor at Keio University and Co-Director of the Keio Cyber Civilization Research Center (CCRC).

He was a founding editor of ICANNWatch. He served on the board of advisers of Context Relevant and The Liquid Information Company. He was one of the founding board members of the Internet Systems Consortium, and had served on that board since 1994.

Farber died in Tokyo from heart failure on February 7, 2026, at the age of 91. At the time of his death, Farber was employed as a professor at Keio University.

== Honors and community service ==
Throughout his life, Farber developed a reputation for connecting people and problems that needed to be solved.

[Farber] was kind of one of the lighthouses of integrity and common sense and spoke truth to power, but also got the powers to speak to one another. {He] was the wise person who knows what's going on and tried to keep people connected, informed and aware of the dangers, aware of the opportunities." - Esther Dyson

Farber was an AAAS Fellow, IEEE Fellow, ACM Fellow, and recipient of the 1995 SIGCOMM Award for lifelong contributions to computer communications. He served on the board of directors of the Electronic Frontier Foundation, the Electronic Privacy Information Center advisory board, the board of trustees of the Internet Society, and was a member of the Presidential Advisory Committee on High Performance Computing and Communications, Information Technology and Next Generation Internet. He ran a large (25,000+ readership) mailing list called Interesting-People. In 2012, in memory of his son, he established the Joseph M. Farber prize at the Stevens Institute of Technology, which recognizes a graduating senior majoring in one of the disciplines of the College of Arts and Letters who displays a keen interest in and concern for civil liberties and their importance in preserving and protecting human rights.

On August 3, 2013, Farber was inducted into the Pioneers Circle of the Internet Hall of Fame. He was elected as the AAAS Fellow by the Council of the American Association for the Advancement of Science in 2018.

== Selected publications ==
- W. A. Arbaugh, D. J. Farber and J. M. Smith, "A secure and reliable bootstrap architecture," Proceedings. 1997 IEEE Symposium on Security and Privacy (Cat. No.97CB36097), Oakland, CA, USA, 1997, pp. 65-71, doi: 10.1109/SECPRI.1997.601317.
- Shapiro, J. S., Smith, J. M., & Farber, D. J. (1999, December). EROS: a fast capability system. In Proceedings of the seventeenth ACM symposium on Operating systems principles (pp. 170-185).
- Farber, D. J., Griswold, R. E., & Polonsky, I. P. (1964). SNOBOL, a string manipulation language. Journal of the ACM (JACM), 11(1), 21-30.
- Satyanarayanan, M., Gilbert, B., Toups, M., Tolia, N., Surie, A., O'Hallaron, D. R., ... & Lagar-Cavilla, H. A. (2007). Pervasive personal computing in an internet suspend/resume system. IEEE Internet Computing, 11(2), 16-25.
- Merlin, P. M., & Farber, D. J. (2006). A parallel mechanism for detecting curves in pictures. IEEE Transactions on Computers, 100(1), 96-98.
