= Control communications =

Technological branch for communication facilities dedicated to control purposes

In telecommunications, control communications is the branch of technology devoted to the design, development, and application of communications facilities used specifically for control purposes, such as for controlling (a) industrial processes, (b) movement of resources, (c) electric power generation, distribution, and utilization, (d) communications networks, and (e) transportation systems.
