= Telecoms resilience =

The term telecoms resilience means enabling a telephone subscriber to continue to be served even when one line is out of service. The UK carrier networks are required by Ofcom to be 99.999% resilient. This means there should be no more than 5 minutes per year downtime in any single telephone exchange.

Connectivity from the local telephone exchanges to the customer premises is called the "last mile". This can be an ISDN30 connection, delivered through either a copper or fibre cable. This ISDN30 can carry 30 simultaneous telephone calls and many direct dial-in telephone numbers, (DDI's).

When leaving the telephone exchange, the ISDN30 cable can be buried in the ground, usually in ducting, at very little depth. This makes any business telephone lines vulnerable to being dug up during streetworks, liable to flooding during heavy storms and general wear and tear due to natural elements. Loss, therefore, of the "last mile" will cause the failure to deliver any calls to the business affected. Business continuity planning often provides for this type of technical failure.

Any business with ISDN30 type of connectivity should provide for this failure within its business continuity planning. There are many ways to achieve this, as documented by both the Cabinet Office and the CPNI.

== Dual parenting ==
Dual parenting is where the telephone carrier provides the same numbers from two different telephone exchanges. If the cable is damaged from one telephone exchange to the customer premises most of the calls can be delivered from the surviving route to the customer.

== Diverse routing ==
Diverse routing is where the carrier provides more than one route to bring the ISDN 30’s from the exchange, or exchanges, (as in dual parenting), but they may share underground ducting and cabinets, (those green boxes by the side of the road.)

== Separacy ==
Separacy is the carrier can provide more than one route to bring the ISDN 30’s from the exchange, or exchanges, (as in dual parenting), but they may not share underground ducting and cabinets, and therefore should be absolutely separate from the telephone exchange to the customer premises.

== Exchange based solutions ==
Exchange based solutions are where a specialist company working in association with the carriers offers an enhancement to the ability to divert ISDN30’s upon failure to any other number or group of numbers. Carrier diversions are usually limited to all of the ISDN30 DDI numbers being delivered to 1 single number. In the UK, GemaTech offers this service in association with all of the carriers other than Verizon. By being in the exchanges, the GemaTech version offers a part diversion service if required and voice recording of calls if required.

== Non-exchange based diversion services ==
Non-exchange based diversion services are where a specialist company working in association with BT offers an enhancement to the ability to divert ISDN30’s upon failure to any other number or group of numbers. Carrier diversions are usually limited to all of the ISDN30 DDI numbers being delivered to 1 single number. In the UK Teamphone offers this service in association with BT Group. By not being in the exchanges, the Teamphone version offers an all or nothing diversion service if required but does not offer voice recording of calls.

== Ported number services ==
Ported number services are where customers numbers can be ported to a specialist company where the numbers are pointed to the ISDN30 DDI numbers during business as usual and delivered to alternative numbers during a business continuity need. These are generally carrier independent and there are a number of companies offering such solutions in the UK.

== Hosted numbers ==
Hosted numbers are where the carriers or specialist companies can host the customers numbers within their own or the carriers networks and deliver calls over an IP network to the customers sites. When a diversion service is required, the calls can be pointed to alternative numbers.

== Inbound numbers (08 type services) ==
Inbound numbers are where the carriers or specialist companies can offer 08/05/03 prefixed numbers to deliver to the ISDN30 DDI numbers and can point them to alternative numbers in the event of a diversion requirement. Both carriers and specialist companies offer this type of service in the UK.

== Smartnumbers (both Geographic and Non-Geographic type services) ==
A smartnumber is a new type of voice continuity number where instead of storing the telephone number in the local BT telephone exchange, it is instead stored in BT's voice continuity 'cloud'. Calls made to a smartnumber can be delivered to any handset anywhere in the UK or the world, thus protecting a company from loss of a telephone exchange, loss of the ISDN or SIP circuits connecting the company to the telephone exchange, loss of the customers PBX on their premises or denial of access to their business premises. Should any of these circumstances occur, the company can use a web-based portal to change the call routing to individual numbers or to large groups of telephone numbers at the same time.

== See also ==
- Digital Revolution
- Telecommunications
- Information Age
- New media
- Telemetry
