= Milica Stojanovic =

American-Serbian engineer

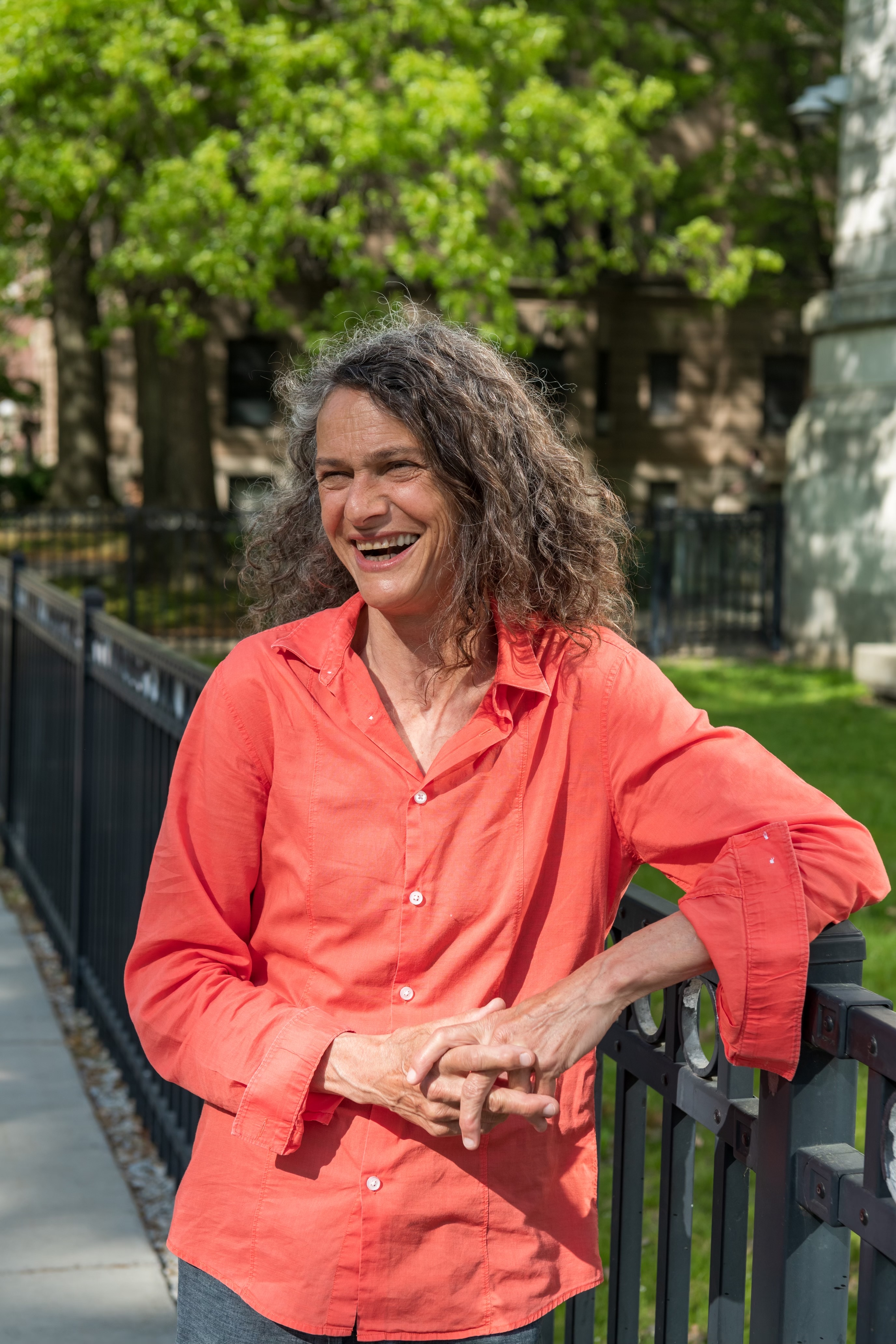
- Born: Belgrade, Serbia
- Spouse: Zoran Zvonar

Academic background
- Education: B.S., 1988, University of Belgrade; MS, 1991, PhD, 1993, Northeastern University
- Thesis: Coherent digital communications for rapidly fading channels with applications to underwater acoustics (1994)

Academic work
- Institutions: Northeastern University
- Website: milica.sites.northeastern.edu

Milica Stojanovic is an American-Serbian engineer. She is a Professor of Electrical and Computer Engineering at Northeastern University. Stojanovic's work focuses on wireless information transmission through challenging environments and in particular on underwater acoustic communications.

== Early life and education ==
Stojanovic was born and raised in Belgrade, Serbia, where she completed her Bachelor of Science diploma at the University of Belgrade. Following this, she moved to the United States and enrolled at Northeastern University for her Master's degree in 1991 and Ph.D. in electrical engineering in 1993. Upon graduation, she was awarded a Postdoctoral Fellowship from the Woods Hole Oceanographic Institution.

== Career ==
Following her fellowship, Stojanovic began working as a principal scientist at the Massachusetts Institute of Technology (MIT), where she was affiliated with the Autonomous Underwater Vehicle (AUV) Laboratory and also served as an associate director for research at the MIT Sea Grant College Program. Stojanovic eventually joined the faculty of Electrical and Computer Engineering at her alma mater, Northeastern University, in 2008 but remained affiliated with Woods Hole. As an associate professor, she focused on improving the transmission of acoustical signals underwater. In the same year, Stojanovic was also elected a Fellow of the Institute of Electrical and Electronics Engineers (IEEE) for her contributions to underwater acoustic communications.

By 2012, Stojanovic was appointed an associate editor for the IEEE Journal of Oceanic Engineering and the IEEE Transactions on Signal Processing. She also serves as the chair of the IEEE Ocean Engineering Society Technical Committee for Underwater Communication, Navigation, and Positioning. While serving in these roles, she was recognized for her "sustained contributions towards the development, analysis and development of underwater acoustic communication and sensing networks" with the 2015 IEEE Oceanic Engineering Society's Distinguished Technical Achievement Award. Stojanovic was also awarded the 2019 IEEE Women in Communications Engineering Outstanding Achievement Award for "having done outstanding technical work in the broad field of communications engineering, and for achieving a high degree of visibility in the field." In 2022, she was awarded an honorary doctorate from the Aarhus University in Denmark and was elected into the Academy of Engineering Sciences of Serbia.

=== Research ===
Stojanovic's work focuses on wireless information transmission through challenging environments and in particular on underwater acoustic communications. It addresses the problems of signal transmission and detection, modeling of random variations in the propagation medium, and design of communication networks. Early in her career, Stojanovic designed bandwidth-efficient signal processing methods that contributed to the development of the first phase-coherent high-speed acoustic modem. Subsequently, she focused on improving the transmission of acoustical signals underwater, including video transmission over short distances, and extending the point-to-point links to networked configurations. She has published extensively on these topics and holds several patents.

== Personal life ==
Stojanovic and her husband, Zoran Zvonar, were the first married couple to be named IEEE Fellows in the same year. They also have three children together.
