= Molecular communication =

Using the presence or absence of molecules to digitally encode messages

Molecular communications systems use the presence or absence of a selected type of molecule to digitally encode messages. The molecules are delivered into communications media such as air and water for transmission. The technique also is not subject to the requirement of using antennas that are sized to a specific ratio of the wavelength of the signal. Molecular communication signals can be made biocompatible and require very little energy.

== Nature ==
Molecular signaling is used by plants and animals, such as the pheromones that insects use for long-range signaling.

== Alcohol ==
In 2016 researchers demonstrated the use of evaporated alcohol molecules to carry messages across several meters of open space and successfully decoded the message on the other side. The presence of molecules encoded to digital 1 and their absence encoded to 0. The hardware cost around 100 US dollars.

== Chemical systems ==
A Russian patent for a wireless network that uses a chemical system as the physical medium for data transmission, instead of the environment, was granted in 2018 (application was filed in April 10 2015). The signals representing electronic messages transmitted through the wireless communication channel of this hypothetical wireless computer network would be changes of the chemical system's chemical composition.
