= Nanonetwork =

Computing network of nanomachines, at nanoscale

A nanonetwork or nanoscale network is a set of interconnected nanomachines (devices a few hundred nanometers or a few micrometers at most in size) which are able to perform only very simple tasks such as computing, data storing, sensing and actuation. Nanonetworks are expected to expand the capabilities of single nanomachines both in terms of complexity and range of operation by allowing them to coordinate, share and fuse information. Nanonetworks enable new applications of nanotechnology in the biomedical field, environmental research, military technology and industrial and consumer goods applications. Nanoscale communication is defined in IEEE P1906.1.

== Communication approaches ==
Classical communication paradigms need to be revised for the nanoscale. The two main alternatives for communication in the nanoscale are based either on electromagnetic communication or on molecular communication.

=== Electromagnetic ===
This is defined as the transmission and reception of electromagnetic radiation from components based on novel nanomaterials. Recent advancements in carbon and molecular electronics have opened the door to a new generation of electronic nanoscale components such as nanobatteries, nanoscale energy harvesting systems, nano-memories, logical circuitry in the nanoscale and even nano-antennas. From a communication perspective, the unique properties observed in nanomaterials will decide on the specific bandwidths for emission of electromagnetic radiation, the time lag of the emission, or the magnitude of the emitted power for a given input energy, amongst others.

For the time being, two main alternatives for electromagnetic communication in the nanoscale have been envisioned. First, it has been experimentally demonstrated that is possible to receive and demodulate an electromagnetic wave by means of a nanoradio, i.e., an electromechanically resonating carbon nanotube which is able to decode an amplitude or frequency modulated wave. Second, graphene-based nano-antennas have been analyzed as potential electromagnetic radiators in the terahertz band.

=== Molecular ===
Molecular communication is defined as the transmission and reception of information by means of molecules. The different molecular communication techniques can be classified according to the type of molecule propagation in walkaway-based, flow-based or diffusion-based communication.

In walkway-based molecular communication, the molecules propagate through pre-defined pathways by using carrier substances, such as molecular motors. This type of molecular communication can also be achieved by using E. coli bacteria as chemotaxis.

In flow-based molecular communication, the molecules propagate through diffusion in a fluidic medium whose flow and turbulence are guided and predictable. The hormonal communication through blood streams inside the human body is an example of this type of propagation. The flow-based propagation can also be realized by using carrier entities whose motion can be constrained on the average along specific paths, despite showing a random component. A good example of this case is given by pheromonal long range molecular communications.

In diffusion-based molecular communication, the molecules propagate through spontaneous diffusion in a fluidic medium. In this case, the molecules can be subject solely to the laws of diffusion or can also be affected by non-predictable turbulence present in the fluidic medium. Pheromonal communication, when pheromones are released into a fluidic medium, such as air or water, is an example of diffusion-based architecture. Other examples of this kind of transport include calcium signaling among cells, as well as quorum sensing among bacteria.

Based on the macroscopic theory of ideal (free) diffusion the impulse response of a unicast molecular communication channel was reported in a paper that identified that the impulse response of the ideal diffusion based molecular communication channel experiences temporal spreading. Such temporal spreading has a deep impact in the performance of the system, for example in creating the intersymbol interference (ISI) at the receiving nanomachine. In order to detect the concentration-encoded molecular signal two detection methods named sampling-based detection (SD) and energy-based detection (ED) have been proposed. While the SD approach is based on the concentration amplitude of only one sample taken at a suitable time instant during the symbol duration, the ED approach is based on the total accumulated number of molecules received during the entire symbol duration. In order to reduce the impact of ISI a controlled pulse-width based molecular communication scheme has been analysed. The work presented in showed that it is possible to realize multilevel amplitude modulation based on ideal diffusion. A comprehensive study of pulse-based binary and sinus-based, concentration-encoded molecular communication system have also been investigated.

== See also ==
- IEEE P1906.1 Recommended Practice for Nanoscale and Molecular Communication Framework
