= Enrique Herrera Viedma =

- Born: May 30, 1969 (age 57); Jódar, Jaén, Spain

Academic background
- Education: University of Granada
- Thesis: Modelos lingüísticos para la toma de decisiones en grupo (1996)
- Doctoral advisor: José Luis Verdegay Galdeano and Francisco Herrera Triguero

Academic work
- Discipline: Computer science Artificial Intelligence
- Institutions: University of Granada
- Website: ccia.ugr.es

Enrique Herrera Viedma (born 30 May 1969) is the Vice-Rector for Research and Knowledge Transfer at the University of Granada (UGR), Spain. He is also Professor in Computer Science and Artificial Intelligence at the same university since 1994.

== Biography ==
Enrique Herrera-Viedma received his BSc in Computer Science in 1993 and his PhD in Computer Science in 1996, both from the University of Granada. He is Professor with the Department of Computer Science and Artificial Intelligence (DECSAI). He was one of the founding members of the Soft Computing and Intelligent Information Systems research group (SCI2S), created and headed the Research Laboratory on Fuzzy Decision Making and Information Retrieval (SECABA), and also was one of the founding members of the Andalusian Research Institute in Data Science and Computational Intelligence (DaSCI). In the University of Granada, he was Vice-Dean for Research in the Faculty of Communication and Documentation for more than 10 years and he is Vice-Rector for Research and Knowledge Transfer since 2015.

He has been identified by Clarivate Analytics as a highly cited researcher in Computer Science and Engineering every year from 2015 to 2022. His research interests also include Library and Information Science, where he has also made major contributions including publishing in the journal Science. Herrera Viedma also holds senior positions and distinctions in scientific societies in Artificial Intelligence. He is Vice-President Cybernetics in IEEE Systems, Man, and Cybernetics Society (IEEE SMCS) and was Vice-President Publications in IEEE SMC Society 2019-2020. He is associate editor of journals such as IEEE Transactions on SMC: Systems and IEEE Transactions on Intelligent Transportation Systems (T-ITS). He has been named an IAITQM fellow (2019), an IEEE fellow (2021), and an IFSA fellow (2021), and is Member of the Academia Europaea (The Academy of Europe) since 2022.

At national level, he participates as an advisor in different councils. Since 2020, it is member of the Advisory Committee for public information and participation of the Nuclear Safety Council. Since the same year, Herrera Viedma is also member of the Advisory Council of the Elcano Royal Institute. He has also coordinated the participation of the University of Granada in the candidature of Granada for the IFMIF-DONES project and its development.

== Awards ==
- 2011 — IEEE Transactions on Fuzzy Systems Outstanding Paper Award from the IEEE Computational Intelligence Society
- 2014 — Best Paper Herbert Simon Award of International Journal of Information Technology & Decision Making
- 2016 — Andrew P. Sage Best Transactions Paper Award
