= Biedma =

Biedma may refer to:

== Places ==
- Biedma Department, a department located in the north east of Chubut Province, on the Atlantic coast of Argentina

== People ==
- Esperanza Aguirre Gil de Biedma, Spanish politician
- Francisco de Biedma y Zayas, Spanish military officer
- Jaime Gil de Biedma, Spanish poet
- Juan "Hungrybox" Debiedma, professional Super Smash Bros. player
- Patrocinio de Biedma y la Moneda, Spanish writer

== See also ==
- Viedma (disambiguation)
