= Milan Zeleny bibliography =

This is an incomplete list of selected academic publications by Milan Zeleny, sorted by different disciplines and research areas.

== Articles ==
=== Pre-exile work until 1967 ===
- Analysis of Complex Projects by Critical Path Method (Analýza složitých procesů metodou kritické cesty), Ekonomicko-matematická laboratoř při EÚ ČSAV, Výzkumná publikace č. 4, Praha, 1964, p. 130.
- "Network Analysis Techniques (CPM, PERT)" (Metody analýzy sítí (CPM, PERT)), Ekonomicko-matematický obzor, 1(1965) 3, pp. 225–262.
- “The Multidimensional Model of Complex Technological Projects” (Vícerozměrný model složitých technicko-ekonomických procesů (VRM-step)), Pozemní stavby, 13(1965), pp. 351–4. (With P. Bezděk)
- “Scientific Management of Complex Systems" (Vědecké řízení složitých soustav), Věda a život, č. 1-2 (1965), pp. 705– 709.
- "Optimal Balancing of Production Lines" (Metody optimálního vyvažování výrobních linek), Podniková Organizace, 20(1966)19, pp. 456– 458.
- American Specialists on Critical Path (Američtí specialisté o kritické cestě), Ekonomicko-matematická laboratoř při EÚ ČSAV, Informační publikace č. 25, Praha, 1966, p. 88.
- "Network Analysis by Dynamic Programming Technique" (Analýza sítě technikou dynamického programování), Ekonomicko–matematický obzor, 3(1967) 1, pp. 63–74.
- "A Markovian Approach to Network Analysis Methods-MANAM” (Markovský přístup k řešení problémů analýzy sítě), Ekonomicko–matematický obzor, 3(1967)2, pp. 214–259.

=== Optimization ===
- Linear Multiobjective Programming, Springer-Verlag, New York, 1974, p. 220.
- "The Techniques of Linear Multiobjective Programming," Revue Française d'Automatique, d'Informatique et de Recherche Operationelle, 8(1974) V-3, pp. 51–71. (With P. L. Yu)
- "The Set of All Nondominated Solutions in Linear Cases and A Multicriteria Simplex Method," Journal of Mathematical Analysis and Applications, 49(1975) 2, pp. 430–468. (With P. L. Yu)
- "Ellipsoid Algorithms in Mathematical Programming," Human Systems Management, 1(1980) 2, pp. 173–178.
- "The Pros and Cons of Goal Programming," Computers and Operations Research, 8(1981)4, pp. 357–359.
- "An External Reconstruction Approach (ERA) to Linear Programming," Computers and Operations Research, 13(1986) 1, pp. 95–100.
- "Optimal System Design: Towards New Interpretation of Shadow Prices in Linear Programming," Computers and Operations Research, 14(1987) 4, pp. 265–271. (With M. Hessel)
- "Fuzziness, Knowledge, and Optimization: New Optimality Concepts," in: Fuzzy Optimization: Recent Advances, edited by M. Delgado, J. Kacprzyk, J.-L. Verdegay and M.A. Vila, Physica-Verlag, Heidelberg, 1994, pp. 3–20.
- "Rethinking Optimality: Eight Concepts," Human Systems Management, 15(1996)1, pp. 1–4.
- "Eight Concepts of Optimality," in: Multicriteria Analysis, edited by J. Climaco, Springer-Verlag, Berlin, 1997, pp. 191–200.
- "From Maximization to Optimization: MCDM and the Eight Models of Optimality," in: Essays in Decision Making, edited by M. H. Karwan, J. Spronk and J. Wallenius, Springer-Verlag, 1997, pp. 107–119.

=== Multiple Criteria Decision Making ===
- Multiple Criteria Decision Making, University of South Carolina Press, Columbia, S. C., 1973, p. 816. (Editor with J. L. Cochrane)
- "A Concept of Compromise Solutions and the Method of the Displaced Ideal," Computers and Operations Research, 1(1974) 4, pp. 479–496.
- Multiple Criteria Decision Making: Kyoto 1975, Springer-Verlag, New York, 1976, p. 340. (Editor)
- "Games with Multiple Payoffs," International Journal of Game Theory, 4(1976) 4, pp. 179–191.
- Multiple Criteria Decision Making, McGraw-Hill, New York, 1982.
- Multiple Criteria Decision Making: Selected Case Studies, McGraw-Hill, New York, 1982. (Editor with C. Carlsson and A. Torn)
- MCDM - Past Decade and Future Trends, A Source Book of Multiple Criteria Decision Making, JAI Press, Greenwich, Conn., 1984. (Editor)
- "Introduction: Ten Years of MCDM," in: MCDM - Past Decade and Future Trends, A Source Book of Multiple Criteria Decision Making, edited by M. Zeleny, JAI Press, Greenwich, Conn., 1984, pp. ix-xiii. Also: "Multicriterion Design of High-Productivity Systems," pp. 169–187.
- "Multiple Criteria Decision Making (MCDM)," in: Encyclopedia of Statistical Sciences, vol. 5, John Wiley & Sons, New York, 1985, pp. 693–696.
- "Multicriteria Decision Making," in: Systems & Control Encyclopedia, Pergamon Press, Elmsford, N.Y., 1987, pp. 3116–3121.
- "Systems Approach to Multiple Criteria Decision Making: Metaoptimum," in: Toward Interactive and Intelligent Decision Support Systems, edited by Y. Sawaragi, K. Inoue and H. Nakayama, Springer-Verlag, New York, 1987, pp. 28–37.
- "Multicriteria Decision Making," in: Systems & Control Encyclopedia, Supplementary Volume 1, Pergamon Press, Elmsford, N.Y., 1990, pp. 431–437.
- "Gestalt System of Holistic Graphics: New Management Support View of MCDM," Computers and Operations Research, 18(1991) 2, pp. 233–239. (With E. Kasanen and R. Ostermark)
- "Cognitive Equilibrium," Ekonomicko-matematický obzor, 27(1991) 1, pp. 53–61
- "Measuring Criteria: Weights of Importance," Human Systems Management, 10(1991) 4, pp. 237–238.
- "An Essay into a Philosophy of MCDM: A Way of Thinking or Another Algorithm?" Invited Essay, Computers and Operations Research, 19(1992) 7, pp. 563–566.
- "The Ideal-Degradation Procedure: Searching for Vector Equilibria," in: Advances In Multicriteria Analysis, edited by P.M. Pardalos, Y. Siskos, C. Zopounidis, Kluwer, 1995, pp. 117–127.
- "Tradeoffs-Free Management," in: The Art and Science of Decision-Making, edited by P. Walden et al., Abo University Press, Abo, 1996, pp. 276–283.
- "Towards the Tradeoffs-Free Optimality in MCDM," in: Multicriteria Analysis, edited by J. Climaco, Springer-Verlag, Berlin, 1997, pp. 596–601.
- "Multiple Criteria Decision Making: Eight Concepts of Optimality," Human Systems Management, 17(1998)2, pp. 97–107.
- “The KM-MCDM interface in decision design: tradeoffs-free conflict dissolution“, Int. J. Applied Decision Sciences, 1(2008)1, pp. 3–23.¨
- “MCDM: From Paradigm Lost to Paradigm Regained?” J. of Multiple Criteria Decision Analysis, 2011
- “MCDM: In Search of New Paradigms...” in: The New State of MCDM in 21st Century, MCDM conference, Chengdu, June 22–26, 2009, Springer-Verlag, 2011.

=== Management Science ===
- "Managers Without Management Science?" Interfaces, 5(1975) 4, pp. 35–42.
- "New Vistas of Management Science," Computers and Operations Research, 2(1975) 2, pp. 121–125.
- "The Attribute-Dynamic Attitude Model (ADAM)," Management Science, 25(1976) 1, pp. 12–26.
- "Linear Multiparametric Programming by Multicriteria Simplex Method," Management Science, 23(1976) 2, pp. 159–170. (With P. L. Yu)
- Multiple Criteria Decision Making, TIMS Studies in the Management Sciences, Vol. 6, North-Holland Publishing Co., Amsterdam, 1977, p. 270. (Editor with M.K. Starr)
- "The Last Mohicans of OR: Or, It Might Be in the 'Genes'," Interfaces, 9(1979) 5, pp. 135–141.
- "Descriptive Decision Making and Its Applications," in: Applications of Management Science, Vol. 1, edited by R.L. Schultz, JAI Press, Greenwich, Conn., 1981, pp. 327–388.
- "New Vistas in Management Science," in: Cases and Readings in Management Science, edited by E.F. Turban and P. Loomba, Business Publications, Plano, Texas, 1982, pp. 319–325.
- "Work and Leisure," in: International Encyclopedia of Business & Management, Routledge, London, 1996, pp. 5082–8. Also: "Multiple Criteria Decision Making," pp. 978–90. "Critical Path Analysis (CPA)," pp. 904–9. "Optimality and Optimization," pp. 3767–80. "Bata-System of Management," pp. 351–4.
- Human Systems Management: Integrating Knowledge, Management and Systems, World Scientific, 2nd Printing 2008.
- “Strategy as Action: from Porter to Anti-Porter,” Int. J. Strategic Decision Sciences, 1(2010)1, pp. 1–22.

=== Psychology and Judgment ===
- "On the Inadequacy of the Regression Paradigm Used in the Study of Human Judgment," Theory and Decision, 7(1976) 1/2, pp. 57–65.
- "Conflict Dissolution," General Systems Yearbook, XXI, 1976, pp. 131–136.
- "Intuition and Probability," The Wharton Magazine, 1(1977)4, pp. 63–68.
- "Intuition, Its Failures and Merits," in: Surviving Failures, edited by B. Persson, Humanities Press, Atlantic Highlands, N.J., 1979, pp. 172–183.
- "Cognitive Equilibrium: A New Paradigm of Decision Making?" Human Systems Management, 8(1989)3, pp. 185–188.
- "In Search of Cognitive Equilibrium: Beauty, Quality and Harmony," Multi-Criteria Decision Analysis, 3(1994), pp. 48.1-48.11.

=== Autopoiesis ===
- "Simulation of Self-Renewing Systems," in: Evolution and Consciousness: Human Systems in Transition, edited by E. Jantsch and C. H. Waddington, Addison-Wesley, Reading, Ma., 1976, pp. 150–165. (With N.A. Pierre)
- "Self-Organization of Living Systems: A Formal Model of Autopoiesis," Int. J. General Systems, 4(1977) I, pp. 13–28.
- "APL-AUTOPOIESIS: Experiments in Self-Organization of Complexity," in: Progress in Cybernetics and Systems Research, vol. Ill, edited by R. Trappl et al., Hemisphere Publishing Corp., Washington, D.C., 1978, pp. 65–84.
- Autopoiesis, Dissipative Structures, and Spontaneous Social Orders, AAAS Selected Symposium 55, Westview Press, Boulder, Co., 1980. (Editor)
- "Autopoiesis: A Paradigm Lost?" in: Autopoiesis, Dissipative Structures, and Spontaneous Social Orders, AAAS Selected Symposium 55, edited by M. Zeleny, Westview Press, Boulder, Co., 1980, pp. 3–43.
- "What Is Autopoiesis?" in: Autopoiesis: A Theory of Living Organization, edited by M. Zeleny, Elsevier North Holland, New York, NY, 1981, pp. 4–17.
- "Autogenesis: On the Self-Organization of Life," in: Autopoiesis: A Theory of Living Organization, edited by M. Zeleny, Elsevier North Holland, New York, NY, 1981, pp. 91–115.
- "Autopoiesis Today," in: Cybernetics Forum, Special Issue Devoted toAutopoiesis, edited by M. Zeleny, 10(1981) 2/3, Summer/Fall 1981, pp. 3–6. Also: "Self-Organization of Living Systems: A Formal Model of Autopoiesis," pp. 24–38.
- "Autopoiesis," in: Systems & Control Encyclopedia, Pergamon Press, Elmsford, N.Y., 1987, pp. 393–400.
- "Simulation Models of Autopoiesis: Variable Structure," in: Systems & Control Encyclopedia, Pergamon Press, Elmsford, N.Y., 1987, pp. 4374–4377.
- "Simulation Models of Autopoiesis: Variable Structure," in: Systems & Control Encyclopedia, Supplementary Volume 1, Pergamon Press, Elmsford, N.Y., 1990, pp. 543–547.
- "All Autopoietic Systems Must Be Social Systems," Journal of Social and Biological Structures, 14(1991) 3, pp. 311–332. (With K. D. Hufford)
- "Are Biological Systems Social Systems?" Human Systems Management, 10(1991)2, pp. 79–81.
- "The Application of Autopoiesis in Systems Analysis: Are Autopoietic Systems Also Social Systems?" Int. J. General Systems, 21(1992) 2, pp. 145–160. (With K. D. Hufford)
- "The Ordering of the Unknown by Causing It to Order Itself," Int. J. General Systems, 21(1992) 2, pp. 239–253. (With K. D. Hufford)
- "On Social Nature of Autopoietic Systems," in: Evolution, Order and Complexity, edited by E. L. Khalil and K. E. Boulding, Routledge, London, 1996, pp. 122–145.
- "Autopoiesis and Self-Sustainability in Economic Systems," Human Systems Management, 16(1997)4, pp. 251–262.
- "Autopoiesis (Self-production) in SME Networks," Human Systems Management, 20(2001)3, pp. 201–207.
- “Autopoiesis”, in: International Encyclopedia of Organization Studies, edited by S. R. Clegg and J. R. Bailey, Sage Publications, 2007.

=== Spontaneous Social Orders ===
- "Holistic Aspects of Biological and Social Organizations: Can They Be Studied?" in: Environment and Population: Problems of Adaptation, edited by John B. Calhoun, Praeger Publishers, New York, 1983, pp. 150–153.
- "Spontaneous Social Orders," in: The Science and Praxis of Complexity, The United Nations University, Tokyo, 1985, pp. 312–328.
- "Spontaneous Social Orders," Int. J. General Systems, 11(1985) 2, pp. 117–131.
- "Les orders sociaux spontanes," in: Science et pratique de la complexite, Actes du colloque de Montpellier, Mai 1984, IDATE/UNU, La Documentation Française, Paris, 1986, pp. 357–378.
- "La grande inversione: Corso e ricorso dei modi di vita umani," in: Physis: abitare la terra, edited by M. Ceruti and E. Laszlo, Feltrinelli, Milano, 1988, pp. 413–441.
- "Spontaneous Social Orders," in: A Science of Goal Formulation: American and Soviet Discussions of Cybernetics and Systems Theory, edited by S. A. Umpleby and V. N. Sadovsky, Hemisphere Publishing Corp., Washington, D.C., 1991, pp. 133–150.
- "Alia ricerca di un equilibrio cognitivo: bellezza, qualita e armonia," in: Estimo ed economia ambientale: le nuove frontiere nel campo della valutazione, edited by L. Fusco Girard, Franco Angeli, Milano, 1993, pp. 113–131.
- "Ecosocieties: Societal Aspects of Biological Self-Production," Soziale Systeme, 1(1995)2, pp. 179–202.

=== Economics ===
- Columbia Journal of World Business, Focus: Decision Making, XII (1977)3, p. 136. (Editor with M.K. Starr)
- "At the End of the Division of Labor," Human Systems Management, 6(1986) 2, pp. 97–99.
- "Beyond capitalism and socialism: Human manifesto," Human Systems Management, 7(1988) 3, pp. 185–188.
- "Moving from the Age of Specialization to the Era of Integration," Human Systems Management, 9(1990)3, pp. 153–171. (With R. Comet and J.A.F. Stoner)
- "Transition To Free Markets: The Dilemma of Being and Becoming," Human Systems Management, 10(1991) 1, pp. 1–5.
- "Privatization," Human Systems Management, 10(1991)3, pp. 161–163.
- "Reforms in Czechoslovakia: Tradition or Cosmopolitanism?" in: Management Reform in Eastern and Central Europe: Use of Pre-Communist Cultures, edited by M. Maruyama, Dartmouth Publishing Company (Dover), 1992, pp. 45–64.
- "Economics, Business and Culture," Human Systems Management, 12(1993)3, pp. 171–174.
- "Eastern Europe: Quo Vadis?" Human Systems Management, 12(1993)4, pp. 259–264.
- "Human and Social Capital: Prerequisites for Sustained Prosperity," Human Systems Management, 14(1995)4, pp. 279–282.
- "Asset Optimization and Multi-Resource Planning" Human Systems Management, 15(1996)3, pp. 153–155.
- "Ecosocieta: aspetti sociali dell'auto-produzione biologica," in: Teorie Evolutive e Transformazioni Economiche, edited by E. Benedetti, M. Mistri and S. Solari, CEDAMPadova, 1997, pp. 121–142.
- "The Decline of Forecasting?" Human Systems Management, 16(1997)1, pp. 1–3.
- "Insider Ownership and LBO Performance," Human Systems Management, 16(1997) 4, pp. 243–245.
- "National and Corporate Asset Optimization: From Macro- to Micro-Reengineering," in: Economic Transformation & Integration: Problems, Arguments, Proposals, edited by R. Kulikowski, Z. Nahorski and J. Owsinski, Systems Research Institute, Warsaw, 1998, pp. 103–118.
- "Beyond the Network Organization: Self-Sustainable Web Enterprises," in: Business Networks in Asia, edited by F.-J. Richter, Quorum Books, Westport, CT, 1999, pp. 269–285.
- "Strategy for Macro- and Micro-Reengineering in Knowledge-based Economies” in: The Socio-Economic Transformation: Getting Closer to What? edited by Z. Nahorski, J. Owsinski, and T. Szapiro, Macmillan, London, 1999, pp. 113–125.
- "Elimination of Tradeoffs in Modem Business and Economics," in: New Frontiers of Decision Making for the Information Technology Era, edited by M. Zeleny and Y. Shi, World Scientific Publishers, 2000.
- “Innovation Factory: Production of Value-Added Quality and Innovation,” Economics and Management, 9(2006)4, pp. 58–65.
- “On the Essential Multidimensionality of an Economic Problem: Towards Tradeoffs-Free Economics,” Czech Economic Review, 3(2009)2, pp. 154–175.
- “Invisible Hand of the Market,” in: Atlas of Transformation, JRP Ringier, Zurich, 2010.
- “Ownership,” in: Atlas of Transformation, JRP Ringier, Zurich, 2010, pp.

=== Fuzzy Sets ===
- "Membership Functions and Their Assessment," in: Current Topics in Cybernetics and Systems, edited by J. Rose, Springer-Verlag, Berlin, 1978, pp. 391–392.
- "Fuzzy Sets: Precision and Relevancy," in: Applied Systems and Cybernetics, Vol. 6, edited by G.E. Lasker, Pergamon Press, Elmsford, N.Y., 1981, pp. 2719–2721.
- "Qualitative versus Quantitative Modeling in Decision Making," Human Systems Management, 4(1983) 1, pp. 39–42.
- "On the (Ir) Relevancy of Fuzzy Sets Theories," Human Systems Management, 4(1984)4, pp. 301–306.
- "Parallelism, Integration, Autocoordination and Ambiguity in Human Support Systems," in: Fuzzy Logic in Knowledge-Based Systems, Decision and Control, edited by M.M. Gupta and T. Yamakawa, North-Holland, New York, 1988, pp. 107–122.
- "The Role of Fuzziness in the Construction of Knowledge," in: The Interface Between Artificial Intelligence and Operations Research in Fuzzy Environment, eds. J.-L. Verdegay and M. Delgado, Interdisciplinary Systems Research Series no. 95, Verlag TDv Rheinland, 1989, pp. 233–252.
- "Cognitive Equilibrium: A Knowledge-Based Theory of Fuzziness and Fuzzy Sets," Int. J. General Systems, 19(1991) 4, pp. 359–381.
- "Fuzzifying the 'Precise' Is More Relevant Than Modeling the Fuzzy 'Crisply' (Rejoinder by M. Zeleny)," Int. J. General Systems, 19(1991)4, pp. 435–440.

=== Management ===
- "Management of Human Systems & Human Management of Systems,“ Erhvervs økonomisk Tidsskrift, April 1986, pp. 107–116.
- "Management of Human Systems & Human Management of Systems," in: Trends and Megatrends in the Theory of Management, ed. E. Johnsen, Bratt International, Lund, 1986, pp. 35–44.
- "The Law of Requisite Variety: Is It Applicable to Human Systems?" Human Systems Management, 6(1986) 4, pp. 269–271.
- "On Human Systems Management: An Emerging Paradigm," Human Systems Management, 6(1986) 2, pp. 181–184.
- "Integrated Process Management: A Management Technology for the New Competitive Era," in: Global Competitiveness: Getting the U.S. Back on Track, edited by M.K. Starr, W.W. Norton & Co., New York, 1988, pp. 121–158. (With M. Hessel and M. Mooney)
- "Integrated Process Management: A Management Technology for the New Competitive Era," Part 1 (in Japanese, transl. Y. Kondo), Standardization and Quality Control, 42(1989)10, pp. 61–68. Part 2, 42(1989)11, pp. 78–85. (With M. Hessel and M. Mooney)
- "Management Wisdom of the West," Part 1 (in Japanese), Standardization and Quality Control, 43(1990) 11, pp. 41–48. Part 2, 43(1990) 12, pp. 43–48.
- "Osaka Lectures on IPM," (in Japanese, transl. Y. Kondo), Standardization and Quality Control, 42(1989) 12, pp. 75–82.
- "What Is Integrated Process Management?" Human Systems Management, 7(1988) 3, pp. 265–267.
- "Quality Management Systems: Subject to Continuous Improvement?" Human Systems Management, 8(1989)1, pp. 1–3.
- "Amoeba: The New Generation of Self-Managing Human Systems," Human Systems Management, 9(1990) 2, pp. 57–59.
- "Management Wisdom of the West," Human Systems Management, 9(1990) 2, 119-125.
- "Management Challenges in the 1990s," in: Managing Toward the Millennium, edited by J.E. Hennessy and S. Robins, Fordham University Press, New York, 1991, pp. 3–65. (With R. Comet and J.A.F. Stoner)
- "Towards Trade-Offs-Free Management," Human Systems Management, 13(1994)4, pp. 241–243.
- "Global Management Paradigm," Human Systems Management, 14(1995)3, pp. 191–194.
- "Customer-Specific Value Chain: Beyond Mass Customization?" Human Systems Management, 15(1996)2, pp. 93–97.
- "Comparative Management Systems: Trade-Offs-Free Concept," in: Dynamics of Japanese Organizations, edited by F.-J. Richter, Routledge, London, 1996, pp. 167–177.
- "The Fall of Strategic Planning," Human Systems Management, 16(1997)2, pp. 77–79.
- “Effective Strategic Action: Exploring Synergy Sources of European and Asian Management Systems,” (with M. Blahova), Human Systems Management, 32(2013)3.

=== Baťa System ===
- "The Roots of Modem Management: Bat'a-System," Human Systems Management, 6(1986) 1, pp. 4–7.
- "The Root of Modern Management: Bat'a-System," (in Japanese, transl. Y. Kondo) Standardization and Quality Control, 40(1987)1, pp. 50–53.
- "Three-Men Talk on Bat'a-System," (In Japanese) Standardization and Quality Control, 41(1988) 1, pp. 15–24.
- "Bat'a System of Management: Managerial Excellence Found," Human Systems Management, 7(1988) 3, pp. 213–219.
- "Bata, Thomas (1876-1932)," in: IEBM Handbook of Management Thinking, Thomson, London, 1997, pp. 49–52.
- “Bata Management System: A built-in resilience against crisis at the micro level,” Czech Economic Review, 4(2010)1, pp. 102–117.

=== Finance ===
- "Multidimensional Measure of Risk: Prospect Ranking Vector (PRV)," in: Multiple Criteria Problem Solving, edited by S. Zionts, Springer-Verlag, New York, 1978, pp. 529–548.
- Uncertain Prospects Ranking and Portfolio Analysis Under the Conditions of Partial Information, Mathematical Systems in Economics 44, Oelschlager, Gunn & Hain Publishers, Cambridge, MA., 1979/1980. (With G. Colson)
- "Satisficing, Optimization and Risk in Portfolio Selection," in: Readings in Strategy for Corporate Investment, edited by F.G.J. Derkinderen and R.L. Crum, Pitman Publishing, Boston, 1981, pp. 200–219.

=== History ===
- B. Trentowski, Stosunek Filozofii do Cybernetyki czyli sztuki rzadzenia narodem; A.A. Bogdanov, Tektologia: vseobschaia organizatsionaia nauka; J.Ch. Smuts, Holism and Evolution; S. Leduc, The Mechanism of Life, Int. J. General Systems, 5(1979) 1, pp. 63–71.
- "Cybernetics and General Systems- A Unitary Science?" Kybernetes, 8(1979) 1, pp. 17–23.
- "Cybernetyka," Int. J. General Systems, 13(1987) 3, pp. 289–294.
- "Tectology," Int. J. General Systems, 14(1988) 4, pp. 331–343.
- "Trentowski's Cybemetyka," in: Systems & Control Encyclopedia, Supplementary Volume 1, Pergamon Press, Elmsford, N.Y., 1990, pp. 587–589.
- “W. Edwards Deming,” in: The Oxford Handbook of Management Theorists, eds. M. Witzel and M. Warner, Ch. 11, Oxford University Press, 2013, pp. 196–218.

=== Transformation ===
- "The Self-Service Society: A New Scenario of the Future," Planning Review, 7(1979) 3, pp. 3–7, 37-38.
- "Towards a Self-Service Society," Human Systems Management, 1(1980) 1, pp. 1–3.
- "Socio-Economic Foundations of a Self-Service Society," in: Progress in Cybernetics and Systems Research, vol. 10, Hemisphere Publishing, Washington, D.C., 1982, pp. 127–132.
- "Self-Service Trends in the Society," in: Applied Systems and Cybernetics, Vol. 3, edited by G. E. Lasker, Pergamon Press, Elmsford, N.Y., 1981, pp. 1405–1411.
- "Self-Service Aspects of Health Maintenance: Assessment of Current Trends," Human Systems Management, 2(1981) 4, pp. 259–267. (With M. Kochen)
- "The Grand Reversal: On the Corso and Ricorso of Human Way of Life," World Futures, 27(1989), pp. 131–151.
- "Structural Recession in the U.S.A.," Human Systems Management, 11(1992)1, pp. 1–4.
- "Work and Leisure," in: IEBM Handbook on Human Resources Management, Thomson, London, 1997, pp. 333–339. Also: "Bata-System of Management," pp. 359–362.
- "Industrial Districts of Italy: Local-Network Economies in a Global-Market Web," Human Systems Management, 18(1999)2, pp. 65–68.
- “Machine/Organism Dichotomy of Free-Market Economics: Crisis or Transformation?” Human Systems Management, 29(2010)4, pp. 191–204.
- “Genesis of the Worldwide Crisis,” in: Atlas of Transformation, JRP Ringier, Zurich, 2010.
- “Crisis or Transformation: On the corso and ricorso of human systems,” Human Systems Management, 31(2012)1, pp. 49–63.

=== De Novo Programming ===
- "On the Squandering of Resources and Profits via Linear Programming," Interfaces, 11(1981)5, pp. 101–107.
- "A Case Study in Multiobjective Design: De Novo Programming," in: Multiple Criteria Analysis: Operational Methods, edited by P. Nijkamp and J. Spronk, Gower Publishing, Hampshire, 1981, pp. 37–52.
- "Multicriterion Design of High-Productivity Systems: Extensions and Applications," in: Decision Making with Multiple Objectives, edited by Y.Y. Haimes and V. Chankong, Springer-Verlag, New York, 1985, pp. 308–321.
- "Optimal System Design with Multiple Criteria: De Novo Programming Approach," Engineering Costs and Production Economics, 10(1986), pp. 89–94.
- "Optimizing Given Systems vs. Designing Optimal Systems: The De Novo Programming Approach," Int. J. General Systems, 17(1990) 4, pp. 295–307.
- "De Novo Programming," Ekonomicko-matematický obzor, 26(1990) 4, pp. 406–413.
- "Trade-Offs-Free Management via De Novo Programming," International Journal of Operations and Quantitative Management, 1(1995)1, pp. 3–13.
- "The Evolution of Optimality: De Novo Programming," in: Evolutionary Multi-Criterion Optimization, edited by C.A. Coello Coello et al., Springer-Verlag, Berlin-Heidelberg, 2005, pp. 1–13.
- “Multiobjective Optimization, Systems Design and De Novo Programming,” in: Handbook of Multicriteria Analysis, edited by. C. Zopounidis and P.M. Pardalos, Springer-Verlag, 2010, pp. 243–262.

=== Knowledge Management ===
- "Management Support Systems: Towards Integrated Knowledge Management," Human Systems Management, 7(1987) 1, pp. 59–70.
- "Knowledge as a New Form of Capital, Part 1: Division and Reintegration of Knowledge," Human Systems Management, 8(1989)1, pp. 45–58. "Part 2: KnowledgeBased Management Systems," 8(1989)2, pp. 129–143.
- "Knowledge As Capital/Capital As Knowledge," Human Systems Management, 9(1990)3, pp. l29-130.
- "Knowledge As Capital: Integrated Quality Management," Prometheus, 9(1991)1, pp. 93–101.
- "Knowledge As Coordination of Action," Human Systems Management, 15(1996)4, pp. 211–213.
- "Knowledge-Information Circulation through the Enterprise: Forward to the Roots of Knowledge Management," in: Data Mining and Knowledge Management, edited by Y. Shi, W. Xu, and Z. Chen, Springer-Verlag, Berlin-Heidelberg, 2004, pp. 22–33.
- Human Systems Management: Integrating Knowledge, Management and Systems, World Scientific, 2005.
- "Knowledge-Information Autopoietic Cycle: Towards the Wisdom Systems," Int. J. Management and Decision Making, Vol. 7, No. 1, 2006, pp. 3–18.
- “The Innovation Factory: Management Systems, Knowledge Management and Production of Innovations,“ in: Expanding the Limits of the Possible, edited by P. Walden, R. Fullér, and J. Carlsson, Åbo, November 2006, pp. 163–175.
- “From Knowledge to Wisdom: On Being Informed and Knowledgeable, Becoming Wise and Ethical,” International Journal of Information Technology & Decision Making, 5(2006)4, pp. 751–762.
- “Knowledge Management and the Strategies of Global Business Education: From Knowledge to Wisdom“, in: The Socio-EconomicTransformation: Getting Closer to What? edited by Z. Nahorski, J. W. Owsiński and T. Szapiro, Palgrave Macmillan, Houndmills, 2007, Ch. 7, pp. 101–116.
- “Knowledge Management and Strategic Planning: A Human Systems Perspective,” in: Making Strategies in Spatial Planning: Knowledge and Values, edited by M. Cerreta, G. Concilio and V. Monno, Series: Urban and Landscape Perspectives, Vol. 9, Springer-Verlag, 2010, pp. 257–280.
- “Integrated Knowledge Management,” Int. J. Information Systems and Social Change, 4(2013)4, pp. 54–70.

=== Technology Management ===
- "High Technology Management," Human Systems Management, 3(1982) 2, pp. 57–59.
- "La gestione a tecnologia e la gestione della tecnologia superiore," in: La sfida della complessita, edited by G. Bocchi and M. Ceruti, Feltrinelli, Milano, 1985, pp. 401–413.
- "High Technology Management," Human Systems Management, 6(1986) 2, pp. 109–120.
- "Telework, Telecommuting and Telebusiness," Human Systems Management, 17(1998)4, pp. 223–225.
- IEBM Handbook of Information Technology in Business, Editor, Thomson, London, 2000, p. 870.
- New Frontiers of Decision Making for the Information Technology Era, Editor with Y. Shi, World Scientific Publishers, 2000.
- "Introduction: What Is IT/S?” in: IEBM Handbook of Information Technology in Business, ed. M. Zeleny, Thomson, London, 2000, pp. xv-xvii. Also: "High Technology Management," pp. 56–62. "Global Management Paradigm," pp. 48–55. "Mass Customization," pp. 200–207. "Autopoiesis (Self-Production)," pp. 283–290. "Business Process Reengineering (BPR)," pp. 14–22. "Knowledge vs. Information," pp. 162–168. "Integrated Process Management," pp. 110–118. "Self-Service Society," pp. 240–248. "Telepresence," pp. 821–827. "Kinetic Enterprise & Forecasting," pp. 134–141. "New Economy," pp. 208–217. "Tradeoffs Management," pp. 450–458. "Critical Path Analysis," pp. 308–314. "Decision Making, Multiple Criteria," pp. 315–329. "Optimality and Optimization," pp. 392–409.
- IEBM Handbook of Information Technology in Business, Editor, Paperback edition, Thomson, London, 2001, p. 870.
- "Knowledge of Enterprise: Knowledge Management or Knowledge Technology?" International Journal of Information Technology & Decision Making, 1(2002)2, pp. 181–207.
- “Entering the Era of Networks: Global Supply and Demand Outsourcing Networks and Alliances,” in: Quantitative Methoden der Logistik und des Supply Chain Management, edited by M. Jacquemin, R. Pibornik, and E. Sucky, Verlag Dr. Kovač, Hamburg, 2006, pp. 85–97.
- “The mobile society: effects of global sourcing and network organization”’, Int. J. Mobile Learning and Organization, Vol. 1, No. 1, 2007, pp. 30–40.
- “Strategy and strategic action in the global era: overcoming the knowing-doing Gap”, Int. J. Technology Management, Vol. 43, Nos. 1-3, 2008, pp. 64–75.
- “Technology and High Technology: Support Net and Barriers to Innovation,” Advanced Management Systems, vol. 1, no. 1, 2009, pp. 8–21.
- “Technology and High Technology: Support Net and Barriers to Innovation,” Acta Mechanica Slovaca, vol. 13, no. 1, 2009, pp. 6–19.
- “High Technology and Barriers to Innovation: From Globalization to Localization,” Int. J. Info. Tech. Dec. Mak., 11 (2012) p. 441.

=== Artificial Life ===
- "Osmotic Growths: A Challenge to Systems Science," Int. J. General Systems, 14(1988) 1, pp. 1–17. (With G.J. Klir and K.D. Hufford)
- Interview on Artificial Life, in: "Child of a Lesser God" (E. Regis and T. Dworetzky), Omni, 11(1988) 1, pp. 92–170.
- "Precipitation Membranes, Osmotic Growths, and Synthetic Biology," in: Artificial Life, edited by C.G. Langton, Santa Fe Institute Studies in the Sciences of Complexity, vol. VI, Addison-Wesley, Reading, MA, 1989, pp. 125–139. (With G.J. Klir and K.D. Hufford)
- "Synthetic Biology and Osmotic Growths," in: Systems & Control Encyclopedia, Supplementary Volume 1, Pergamon Press, Elmsford, N.Y., 1990, pp. 573–578.
