= Viedma (disambiguation) =

Viedma is the capital of Río Negro province, Argentina.

Viedma may also refer to:

- Viedma Department, a part of Chubut province, Argentina

== Geographic features ==
- Autódromo Ciudad de Viedma, a motorsports circuit in Viedma, Argentina
- Diocese of Viedma, Argentina
- Viedma Lake, a lake in southern Patagonia
- Viedma Glacier, a large glacier in southern Patagonia
- Viedma (volcano), a subglacial volcano in southern Patagonia

== People ==
- Alejandro Viedma, Spanish footballer
- Enrique Herrera Viedma, Spanish computer scientist
- Juan Viedma (footballer), a retired Spanish-Dutch footballer
- Juan Viedma (athlete), a paralympic athlete from Spain
- Soledad Barrett Viedma, Paraguayan militant activist

== See also ==
- Biedma (disambiguation)
