= Francisco Herrera Triguero =

Spanish computer scientist (born 1966)

- Born: 1966 (age 59–60); Jódar, Jaén, Spain
- Education: University of Granada
- Known for: Evolutionary algorithms, fuzzy systems, decision-making systems
- Scientific career
- Fields: Artificial intelligence, Data mining, Soft computing
- Workplaces: University of Granada

Francisco Herrera Triguero (born 1966) is a Spanish computer scientist and professor whose research focuses on artificial intelligence, particularly soft computing techniques such as evolutionary algorithms and fuzzy logic, with applications in data mining and decision-making.

He is a full professor in the Department of Computer Science and Artificial Intelligence at the University of Granada and has held senior leadership roles at the Andalusian inter-university institute DaSCI (Data Science and Computational Intelligence).

== Early life and education ==
Herrera was born in Jódar (Jaén) in 1966 and studied at the University of Granada, where he later completed doctoral work in artificial intelligence.

== Academic career ==
He joined the Department of Computer Science and Artificial Intelligence at the University of Granada, where he later became a full professor. His has worked in the fields of computer science and engineering.

Since 2018, he has been associated with the leadership of DaSCI, a research institute established by the universities of Granada and Jaén to promote research in data science and computational intelligence.

== Research ==
Herrera’s research has focused on soft computing, including evolutionary computation and fuzzy systems, as well as their application to data mining and intelligent decision-making systems.
