= Patrocinio de Biedma y la Moneda =

Spanish poet and author

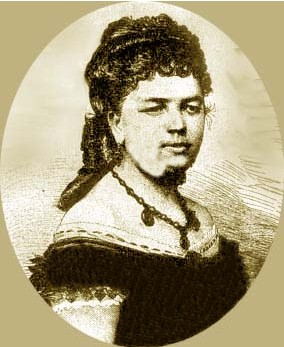

Patrocinio de Biedma y la Moneda (1858-1927) was a Spanish writer. Alongside her poetic output, she also wrote a dozen novels.

== Biography ==
She was born in Begíjar in Jaén in 1858, the daughter of Diego José de Biedma y Marín Colón and Isabel María de la Moneda y Riofrío. Both of her parents were descended from Andalusian nobility. Patrocinio is considered to be the first feminist of Jaén ("la primera feminista jiennense"). She lived for long periods in Baeza, dedicating some of her poems to the city.

She was married in her teens to José María de Quadros y Arellano, the son of the Marques de San Miguel de la Vega. They had three children, all of whom died at an early age. Her husband predeceased her, as well. The death of her first child propelled Patrocinio into the world of writing. In 1877, she went to Cádiz accompanied by her good friend Princess Ratazzi. She founded the journal Cádiz and wrote for numerous publications of the time.

She married for a second time; her new husband José Rodríguez y Rodríguez was chief archivist of the Diputación de Cádiz and ran the Crónica Gaditana. He died in June 1914, leaving Patrocinio widowed for a second time.

Alongside her poetic output, Patrocinio also wrote a dozen novels through the latter decades of the 19th century. She died in Cádiz in 1927.
