= International Journal of Information Technology & Decision Making =

- Discipline: Computer science
- Language: English

Publication details
- Publisher: World Scientific (Singapore)
- Impact factor: 1.406 (2014)

Standard abbreviations
- ISO 4: Int. J. Inf. Technol. Decis. Mak.

Indexing
- ISSN: 0219-6220 (print); 1793-6845 (web)

Links
- Journal homepage

The International Journal of Information Technology & Decision Making was founded in 2002 and is published by World Scientific. It is a peer-reviewed scientific journal covering the application of information technology to decision-making, in areas such as bio-informatics, fuzzy logic, neural networks, and online business. The current editor-in-chief is Yong Shi (College of Information Science and Technology, University of Nebraska–Lincoln, and CAS Research Center on Fictitious Economy & Data Science, Chinese Academy of Sciences).

== Abstracting and indexing ==
The journal is abstracted and indexed in Science Citation Index Expanded, CompuMath Citation Index, and Inspec.
