= List of fellows of IEEE Computer Society =

In the Institute of Electrical and Electronics Engineers, a small number of members are designated as fellows for having made significant accomplishments to the field. The IEEE Fellows are grouped by the institute according to their membership in the member societies of the institute. This list is of IEEE Fellows from the IEEE Computer Society.

Year	Fellow	Citation
1968	Robert G. Gallager	For contributions to information theory and error correcting codes
1970	Thomas Kailath	For inspired teaching of and contributions to information, communication, and control theory
1973	Leonard Kleinrock	For contributions to computer-communication networks, queueing theory, time-shared computer systems, and engineering education.
1974	Gordon Bell	For contributions to the design of time-sharing computer systems, and for education in the understanding of computer structures.
1976	J. K. Aggarwal	For contributions to time delay systems and digital filters.
1979	Karl Johan Åström	For comprehensive contributions to stochastic control theory.
1980	Bernard Friedland	For contributions to the application of modern control theory in navigation, guidance, and control systems.
1980	John Makhoul	For contributions to the theory of linear prediction and its applications to spectral estimation, speech analysis, and data compression.
1981	Robert Kahn	For original work in packet switching mobile radio telecommunications technology.
1981	Daniel Siewiorek	For contributions to the design of modular computer systems.
1982	Peter J. Denning	For contributions to the understanding of virtual memory systems and to the development of the working set concept.
1982	Peter E. Hart	For advances in pattern recognition and artificial intelligence
1982	Marcian Hoff	For the conception and development of the microprocessor.
1982	Carlo Sequin	For developments in charge-coupled image sensors and signal processing devices.
1983	Henri Nussbaumer	For contributions to the theory and development of line switching and data transmission systems.
1983	Jerry Saltzer	For contributions to the design of large-scale computer operating systems.
1984	John Baras	For contributions to distributed parameter systems theory, quantum and nonlinear estimation, and control of queuing systems.
1985	Lynn Conway	For contributions to VLSI technology.
1985	John P. Hayes	For contributions to digital testing techniques and to switching theory and logical design.
1985	Simon Lam	For contributions to the understanding of multiple access techniques, packet-switching networks, and communication protocols.
1985	Fouad Tobagi	For contributions to the field of computer communications and local area networks.
1986	Vishwani Agrawal	For contributions to probabilistic testing techniques for large integrated circuits.
1986	James D. Foley	For contributions to computer graphics.
1986	Kenneth Galloway	For contributions to the study of radiation effects in microelectronics.
1986	Erol Gelenbe	For leadership in the development of computer system performance evaluation.
1986	Richard D. Gitlin	For contributions to data communication techniques.
1988	Alfred Aho	For contributions to programming language translation, to data structures and algorithms, and to data systems.
1988	Peter Chen	For origination and application of the entity-relationship model in database engineering
1988	Fumio Harashima	For contribution to motion control systems and industrial electronics.
1988	Sartaj Sahni	For contributions to computer algorithms, computer-aided design, and large-scale systems.
1989	Prathima Agrawal	For contributions to computer-aided design and testing of integrated circuits.
1989	Hideo Fujiwara	For contributions to research and development on testing of large integrated circuits.
1990	Victor Basili	For contributions to software quality and productivity.
1990	K. Mani Chandy	
1990	Sung Mo Kang	For technical contributions to and leadership in the development of computer-aided design of very-large-scale integrated (VLSI) circuits and systems.
1990	Hussein Mouftah	For contributions to communications modeling.
1990	Mary Shaw	For contributions to computer science education.
1991	Richard P. Brent	For contributions to the development and analysis of parallel algorithms.
1991	Larry Druffel	For leadership in defining and managing national software technology programs.
1991	Stuart Feldman	For contributions to software engineering and software configuration management.
1991	John L. Hennessy	For contributions to the field of computer architecture, VLSI, programming language design, and their implementation, and for developments in reduced instruction set computing architectures.
1991	Ravishankar K. Iyer	For contributions to reliable computing.
1991	Anil K. Jain	For contributions to statistical pattern recognition and image processing.
1991	Alice C. Parker	For contributions to design automation in the areas of high-level synthesis, hardware descriptive languages, and design representation.
1991	Hanan Samet	For contributions in the area of hierarchical data structures for applications in spatial data bases for computer graphics and image processing.
1991	Martha Sloan	For contributions to engineering education, leadership in the development of computer engineering education as a discipline, and leadership in extending engineering education to women.
1991	Benjamin Wah	For contributions to the field of parallel processing.
1992	Jean-Loup Baer	For contributions to the design and analysis of parallel computer systems.
1992	Ruzena Bajcsy	For contributions to machine perception and robotics.
1992	Ramalingam Chellappa	For contributions to statistical model based approaches for two-dimensional spectral analysis and image processing.
1992	Ramesh Jain	For contributions to computer vision in the estimation of structure and motion from images.
1992	Der-Tsai Lee	For contributions to computational geometry and design and analysis of algorithms.
1992	Yale Patt	For innovative contributions to high-speed computer architecture.
1992	Kang G. Shin	For contributions to the theory of dynamic failure in real-time computing systems
1992	Kishor Trivedi	For contributions to reliability and performance analysis of computer and communication systems
1993	Michael A. Harrison	For contributions to the theory of computing and its applications to software systems.
1993	Raj Jain	For contributions to performance analysis and modeling of computer systems and networks and for providing a new direction for solutions to the problem of network congestion.
1993	S. Rao Kosaraju	For contributions to parallel computing theory.
1993	Peter G. Neumann	For contributions to the development of secure computer and communications systems.
1993	Jacob Savir	For contributions to the theory, design, and applications of built-in-self-test systems (BIST).
1993	Jeffrey Vitter	For contributions to the theory of sorting and searching and to the design and analysis of computer algorithms.
1993	Helen M. Wood	For leadership and contributions to computing and communications standardization.
1993	Philip Yu	For contributions to the theory and practice of analytical performance modeling of database systems.
1994	Chen Wen-tsuen	For contributions to software engineering and parallel processing systems design.
1994	Alan M. Davis	For contributions to software engineering.
1994	Giovanni De Micheli	For contribution to synthesis algorithms for the design of electronic circuits and systems.
1994	Daniel Gajski	For contributions to VLSI and system level design methodologies and CAD tools.
1994	Hermann Kopetz	For contributions to the field of fault-tolerant real-time local-area distributed systems.
1994	Lev Levitin	For contributions to physical information theory and quantum communication systems.
1994	David Lynch	For leadership in the development of programmable signal processors and low probability of intercept radar.
1994	Lionel Ni	For contributions to parallel processing and distributed systems.
1994	Alexander Sawchuk	For contributions to digital image processing and optical information processing.
1994	Andries Van Dam	For contributions to computer graphics and leadership in computer graphics standards and education
1994	Bernard Zeigler	For contributions to the theory of discrete event systems modeling and simulation.
1995	Arvind	For contributions to data flow architecture and programming languages.
1995	Prith Banerjee	For contributions to the application of parallel computing to computer-aided design of VLSI circuits.
1995	Gregor von Bochmann	For contributions to the formal specification of protocols for data communications.
1995	Brent Hailpern	For contributions to computer protocol verification.
1995	David Harel	For contributions to theoretical computer science.
1995	Sundaraja Sitharama Iyengar	For contributions to data structures and algorithms for image processing and robotics.
1995	Pradeep Khosla	For contributions to reconfigureable manipulators and reconfigurable software for sensor-based control, and for leadership in curriculum development.
1995	Jane Liu	For contributions to real-time task scheduling methods for computing systems.
1995	Trevor Mudge	For contributions to the design and analysis of high performance processors.
1995	Peter Staecker	For leadership and contributions to the design and development of microwave and millimeter-wave devices and circuits.
1996	Bir Bhanu	For contributions to sensor-based navigation, automatic object recognition and closed-loop adaptive techniques for developing robust algorithms.
1996	Nikolaos Bourbakis	For contributions to digital image scanning algorithms.
1996	Peter A. Freeman	For leadership in the definition of software engineering as a scientific and academic discipline.
1996	Edward D. Lazowska	For advancing the state of the art in computer systems and computer system performance analysis, and for significant technical, educational, and disciplinary leadership.
1996	Keshab K. Parhi	For contributions to the fields of VLSI digital signal processing architectures, design methodologies and tools.
1996	Linda Shapiro	For contributions in the theory of relational matching and its application to model-based computer vision.
1996	Marc Snir	For technical leadership in the development of parallel computation and scalable parallel systems architectures.
1996	Anthony Wasserman	For contributions to software engineering, including the development of computer-aided software engineering (CASE) tools.
1997	Shahid Hussain Bokhari	For contributions to the mapping problem in parallel and distributed computing.
1997	Patricia Daniels	For contributions to engineering education.
1997	Lee Giles	For contributions to the theory and practice of neural networks.
1997	Shigeichi Hirasawa	For contributions to the development of channel coding schemes and error-connecting codes.
1997	Jim Kurose	For contributions to the design of real-time communication protocols.
1997	Henrique Malvar	For contributions to the theory and practice of lapped transforms, fast multirate filter banks, and signal coding.
1997	Satish Tripathi	For advancing the state of the art in computer and network systems analysis and for excellence in technical and educational leadership.
1997	Marvin Zelkowitz	For contributions towards the development of practical programming environment for effective software development.
1998	Joel S. Birnbaum	For contributions to RISC computer architectures and for leadership in industrial research in measurement, computing, and communications technologies
1998	Doris Carver	For contributions to the field of software engineering.
1998	David D. Clark	For leadership in the engineering and deployment of the protocols that embody the Internet.
1998	Larry S. Davis	For contributions to computer vision, image processing and high performance computing.
1998	Wen-Mei Hwu	For contributions to high performance compiler and microarchitecture technologies.
1998	Arie E. Kaufman	For contributions to and leadership in visualization and computer graphics.
1998	Yasuo Matsuyama	For contributions to learning algorithms with competition.
1998	Jaishankar Menon	For contributions to the architecture, algorithms, and implementation of disk array storage systems.
1998	Karem Sakallah	For contributions to the modeling, analysis, and optimization of digital system timing.
1998	Marilyn Wolf	For contributions to Hardware/Software Co-Design.
1998	Willy Zwaenepoel	For contributions to the design and implementation of distributed shared memory systems.
1999	Jean-Luc Gaudiot	For contributions to the programmability and reliability of dataflow architectures.
1999	Benjamin Kuipers	For contributions to qualitative reasoning and representation.
1999	Irith Pomeranz	For contributions to the area of test generation for digital logic circuits.
1999	Arun Somani	For contributions to the theory and application of computer networks.
1999	Yervant Zorian	For contributions to built-in self-test of complex devices and systems.
2000	George Cybenko	For contributions to algorithms and theory of artificial neural networks in signal processing, and to theory and systems software for distributed and parallel computing.
2000	Jack Dongarra	For contributions and leadership in the field of computational mathematics.
2000	Xuedong Huang	For contributions to development of speech technology, standards, and products.
2000	Abraham Silberschatz	For contributions to the development of computer systems dealing with the efficient manipulation and processing of information.
2000	John Yen	For contributions to fuzzy logic, model identifications, soft computing, artificial intelligence, and reasoning under uncertainty.
2001	Carl Chang	For seamless integration of Petri-net oriented techniques to support project management.
2001	Jason Cong	For contributions to the computer-aided design of integrated circuits, especially in physical design automation, interconnect optimization, and synthesis of field-programmable gate-arrays.
2001	Belur V. Dasarathy	For contributions to pattern recognition, sensor fusion, automated intelligent decision system design and image processing.
2001	Yoshiaki Hagiwara	For pioneering work on, and development of, solid-state imagers.
2001	Gunnar Johannsen	For contributions to human-machine systems engineering, cognitive ergonomics, human-computer interface design, and human-centered automation.
2001	Insup Lee	For contributions to the specification languages and verification tools for real-time systems.
2001	Patrick Mantey	For leadership in engineering education, in research and in academic-industrial-government projects.
2001	Bozenna Pasik-Duncan	For contributions to identification and stochastic adaptive control.
2001	Vincenzo Piuri	For contributions to neural network techniques and embedded digital architectures for industrial applications.
2001	Jonathan M. Smith	For contributions to the technology of high-speed networking.
2001	Gene Spafford	For leadership and contributions in the field of information security.
2001	Janos Sztipanovits	For contributions to the design of reconfigurable and adaptive embedded information systems.
2001	Demetri Terzopoulos	For contributions to the theory of deformable models and leadership in their application to computer graphics, computer vision, medical imaging and computer-aided design.
2001	Mateo Valero	For contributions to the design of vector architectures and superscalar processors.
2001	Baba Vemuri	For contributions to shape estimation algorithms in computer vision and the technical leadership that led to their widespread adoption in biomedical image analysis.
2002	Gul Agha	For contributions to the theory and practice of concurrent programming.
2002	Elisa Bertino	For contributions to the theory of object-oriented databases, temporal databases, and database security.
2002	James Demmel	For contributions to the field of computational mathematics and the development of mathematical software.
2002	Toru Ishida	For contributions to autonomous agents and multiagent systems.
2002	Vijay Vaishnavi	For contributions to the theory and practice of software development.
2003	Ronald C. Arkin	For contributions to behavior-based robotic control, multi-robot systems, and hybrid deliberative/reactive software architectures.
2003	Milos Ercegovac	For contributions to the theory and practice of digital arithmetic.
2003	Okyay Kaynak	For contributions to variable structure systems theory and its applications in mechatronics.
2003	Ruby B. Lee	For contributions to general-purpose processor architectures.
2003	Ueli Maurer	For contributions to the theory and practice of cryptography.
2003	Cherri M. Pancake	For technical leadership in improving the usability of computing technology.
2003	Bhavani Thuraisingham	For contributions to secure systems involving database systems, distributed systems, and the web.
2003	Jeannette Wing	For contributions to methods for software systems.
2003	Yang Fuqing	For leadership in software research and practice
2004	Frederica Darema	For contributions to the programming of parallel and distributed computers
2004	Joel Emer	For contributions to computer architecture and quantitative analysis of processor performance.
2004	Rajesh K. Gupta	For contributions to high-level synthesis and computer aided design of digital circuits and systems.
2004	Pankaj Jalote	For contributions to software process improvement, fault tolerant computing, and software engineering education.
2004	Alfred Spector	For leadership in reliable, scalable distributed computer systems.
2004	Josep Torrellas	For contributions to shared-memory multiprocessors.
2004	Michael Waidner	For contributions to the theory and practice of information security, privacy and cryptography.
2004	Steven Wallach	For contributions to high performance computing.
2004	Wu Cheng-wen	For contributions to design and test of array structures.
2004	Hongjiang Zhang	For contributions to media computing and leadership in content-based visual media analysis, retrieval and browsing.
2004	Albert Zomaya	For contributions to the solution of scheduling problems in parallel computing systems.
2005	Minoru Asada	For contributions to robot learning and applications.
2005	Duane Boning	For contributions to modeling and control in semiconductor manufacturing.
2005	Roy H. Campbell	For contributions to concurrent programming, system software, security, and ubiquitous computing.
2005	Tom Conte	For contributions to computer architecture, compiler code generation and performance evaluation.
2005	Mohammad Obaidat	For contributions to adaptive learning, pattern recognition and system simulation.
2005	Bjarne Stroustrup	For contributions to the creation of the C++ programming language and its applications.
2005	Zhengyou Zhang	For contributions to robust computer vision techniques.
2006	Andrei Broder	For contributions to the theory and application of randomized algorithms.
2006	Susan Conry	For contributions to engineering education.
2006	Ingemar Cox	For contributions to digital watermarking.
2006	Venu Govindaraju	For contributions to handwriting recognition.
2006	Katsuo Ikeda	For contributions and leadership in informatics education.
2006	Sandra Johnson	For contributions to the design and performance evaluation of computer systems.
2006	Darrell Long	For contributions to storage systems architecture and performance.
2006	Jitendra Malik	For contributions to computer vision and image analysis.
2006	Nancy R. Mead	For leadership in software engineering education.
2006	Amit Sheth	For contributions to information integration and workflow management.
2006	Heung-Yeung Shum	For contributions to image-based modeling and rendering.
2006	Katia Sycara	For contributions to case based reasoning, multi-agent systems and semantic web services and standards.
2006	Tadashi Watanabe	For contributions to supercomputer architectures.
2006	Lixia Zhang	For contributions to the architecture and signaling protocols in packet switched networks
2007	Jean Bacon	For leadership in design of secure, large scale, distributed systems
2007	Grace Clark	For contributions in block adaptive filtering
2007	Bob Colwell	For technical leadership in turning novel computer architecture concepts into commercial processors
2007	Bill Curtis	For contributions to software process improvement
2007	Mehdi Jazayeri	For contributions to programming languages, software engineering, and informatics education
2007	Çetin Kaya Koç	For contributions to cryptographic engineering
2007	Dalma Novak	For contributions to enabling technologies for the implementation of fiber radio systems
2008	Rajeev Alur	For contributions to automata, logics, and verification techniques for real-time and hybrid systems
2008	Victor Bahl	For contributions to the design of wireless networks and systems and leadership in mobile computing and communications
2008	Krishnendu Chakrabarty	For contributions to the testing of core-based system-on-chip integrated circuits
2008	Pau-Choo Chung	For contributions to neural network models for biomedical image analyses
2008	Diane J. Cook	For contributions to machine learning algorithm design and application
2008	Nikil Dutt	For contributions to architecture description languages for the design and exploration of customized processors
2008	Steven Low	For contributions to internet congestion control
2008	Klara Nahrstedt	For contributions to end-to-end quality of service management of multimedia systems
2008	Karen Panetta	For leadership in engineering education and curriculum development to attract, retain, and advance women in engineering
2008	Alexander Zelinsky	For contributions to vision-based robotics
2009	David S. Ebert	For contributions to data visualization and its applications
2009	Abdulmotaleb El Saddik	For contributions to interactive haptic audio visual systems
2009	Gerhard Fettweis	For contributions to signal processing algorithms and chip implementation architectures for communications
2009	Michael T. Goodrich	For contributions to parallel and distributed algorithms for combinatorial and geometric problems
2009	Jiawei Han	For contributions to data mining and knowledge discovery
2009	David Kotz	For contributions to parallel and distributed systems and wireless networks
2009	Lizy John	For contributions to power modeling and performance evaluation of microprocessors
2009	Richard Ladner	For contributions to computational complexity, algorithms, data compression and accessible computing
2009	Shrikanth Narayanan	For contributions to human-centric multimodal signal processing and applications
2009	Beng Chin Ooi	For leadership in data management technology
2009	David Parnas	For contributions to software engineering
2009	Timothy Pinkston	For contributions to design and analysis of interconnection networks and routing algorithms
2009	Fred B. Schneider	For contributions to trustworthy computing, fault-tolerance and formal methods
2009	Eero Simoncelli	For contributions to statistical models of visual images
2009	Munindar Singh	For contributions to multiagent systems in Internet computing applications
2009	Adam Skorek	For contributions to electro-thermal analysis of industrial processes
2009	Susie Wee	For contributions in multimedia technology
2009	Jie Wu	For contributions to mobile ad hoc networks and multicomputer systems
2009	Qiang Yang	For contributions to understanding and application of intelligent planning, learning and data mining
2009	Yuanyuan Yang	For contributions to parallel and distributed computing systems
2009	Aidong Zhang	For contributions to multimedia data indexing
2009	Xiaodong Zhang	For contributions to computer memory systems
2010	Srinivas Aluru	For contributions to computational biology
2010	Nancy M. Amato	For contributions to the algorithmic foundations of motion planning in robotics and computational biology
2010	David Bader	For contributions to parallel algorithms for combinatorial problems and computational biology
2010	Lionel Briand	For contributions to testing of object-oriented software systems
2010	Ahmed K. Elmagarmid	For contributions to transaction management, data integration and quality
2010	Mootaz Elnozahy	For contributions to rollback-recovery, low-power computing, highly-available file systems, and reliable computing systems
2010	Bill Gropp	For contributions to high performance computing and message passing
2010	James Hendler	For contributions to artificial intelligence, and development of the semantic web
2010	Yannis Ioannidis	For contributions to database systems including query optimization and data management
2010	Andrew Laine	For contributions to wavelet applications in digital mammography, and ultrasound image analysis
2010	Margaret Martonosi	For contributions to power-efficient computer architecture and systems design
2010	Victor S. Miller	For contributions to elliptic curve cryptography
2010	Prasant Mohapatra	For contributions to the quality of service provisioning in computer networks
2010	Lynne Parker	For contributions to distributed and heterogeneous multi-robot systems
2010	Malcolm Slaney	For contributions to perceptual signal processing and tomographic imaging
2010	Aravind Srinivasan	For contributions to randomized algorithms and probabilistic methods
2010	Amitabh Varshney	For contributions to scientific visualization and computer graphics
2010	Shumpei Yamazaki	For contributions to, and leadership in the industrialization of non-volatile memory and thin film transistor technologies
2011	Ricardo Baeza-Yates	For contributions to the development of computer science
2011	Miwako Doi	For contributions to the human interface of document processing
2011	Robert Frankston	For contributions to the first electronic spread sheet and home networking
2011	Laxmikant Kale	For development of parallel programming techniques
2011	Stephen Keckler	For contributions to computer architectures and memory systems
2011	Chih-Jen Lin	For contributions to support vector machine algorithms and software
2011	Wei-Ying Ma	For contributions to multimedia information retrieval
2011	Kathryn S. McKinley	For contributions to compiler technologies
2011	Vijaykrishnan Narayanan	For contributions to power-aware systems and estimation tools
2011	Manish Parashar	For contributions to parallel and distributed computing
2011	Donatella Sciuto	For contributions to embedded system design
2011	Neil Siegel	For leadership in the development of the digital battlefield
2011	Guy Steele	For contributions to the definition, design and standardization of computer languages
2011	Tanveer Syeda-Mahmood	For contributions to content-based image and video indexing and retrieval
2012	Sarita Adve	For contributions to shared memory semantics and parallel computing
2012	James H. Anderson	For contributions to the implementation of soft-real-time systems on multiprocessor and multicore platforms
2012	Kenneth L. Calvert	For contributions to internet topology and active networks
2012	Mark Crovella	For contributions to the measurement and analysis of networks and distributed systems
2012	Rüdiger Dillmann	For contributions to robot programming and human-centerd technologies
2012	Josep Domingo Ferrer	For contributions to privacy, security, and functionality in statistical databases
2012	Irfan Essa	For contributions to computer vision and graphics
2012	Babak Falsafi	For contributions to multiprocessor architecture and memory systems
2012	Susan L. Graham	For contributions to programming language design and implementation and for service to the discipline of computer science
2012	Leonidas J. Guibas	For contributions to algorithms for computational geometry
2012	Charles D. Hansen	For contributions to visualization tools for large-scale scientific datasets
2012	Yennun Huang	For contributions to fault tolerant and failure avoidance software
2012	Lydia Kavraki	For contributions to robot-motion planning and computational biology
2012	Ryuji Kohno	For contributions to spread spectrum and ultra wideband technologies and applications
2012	Kwan-Liu Ma	For contributions to large-scale data visualization
2012	Jianchang Mao	For contributions to pattern recognition, search, content analysis, and computational advertising
2012	Shojiro Nishio	For contributions to data and knowledge management in database systems
2012	Venkata Padmanabhan	For contributions tonetworked and mobile computing systems
2012	Maja Pantić	For contribution to automatic human behavior understanding and affective computing
2012	Marc Pollefeys	For contributions to three-dimensional computer vision
2012	Lawrence Rauchwerger	For contributions to thread-level speculation, parallelizing compilers, and parallel libraries
2012	Fabio Roli	For contributions to multiple classifier systems
2012	Valentina Salapura	For contributions to the architecture and design of multiprocessor systems
2012	Pierangela Samarati	For contributions to information security, data protection, and privacy
2012	Stephen Trimberger	For contributions to circuits, architectures and software technology for fleld-programmable gate arrays
2012	Jiangtao Wen	For contributions to multimedia communication technology and standards
2012	Xiaoqing Wen	For contributions to testing of integrated circuits
2012	Junshan Zhang	For contributions to cross-layer optimization of wireless networks
2013	Robert Campbell Aitken	For contributions to testing and diagnosis of integrated circuits
2013	Raja Chatila	For contributions to robot navigation and cognitive robotics
2013	Mihai Datcu	For contributions to information mining of high resolution synthetic aperature radar and optical earth observation images
2013	Elena Ferrari	For contributions to security and privacy for data and applications
2013	Alan Dale George	For contributions to reconfigurable and high-performance computing
2013	Dimitris Gizopoulos	For contributions to self-testing and on-line error detection of microprocessor architectures
2013	James Hoe	For contributions to high-level hardware design and synthesis
2013	Sushil Jajodia	For contributions to information security, data protection, and privacy
2013	Xiaohua Jia	For contributions to distributed computing systems and multicast communications
2013	Masaru Kitsuregawa	For contributions to high performance database technology
2013	Joseph Konstan	For contributions to human-computer interaction and social media applications
2013	Carl Landwehr	For contributions to cybersecurity
2013	Yi Ma	For contributions to computer vision and pattern recognition
2013	Radu Marculescu	For contributions to design and optimization of on-chip communication for embedded multicore systems
2013	Igor Markov	For contributions to optimization methods in electronic design automation
2013	Subhasish Mitra	For contributions to design and test of robust integrated circuits
2013	Jon Rokne	For contributions to computer graphics and geographic information systems
2013	Weiming Shen	For contributions to agent-based collaboration technologies and applications
2013	Valerie Taylor	For contributions to performance enhancement of parallel computing applications
2013	Matthew Turk	For contributions to computer vision and perceptual interfaces
2013	Jerzy Tyszer	For contributions to digital VLSI circuit testing and test compression
2013	Ramasamy Uthurusamy	For contributions to data mining and artificial intelligence
2013	Ingrid Verbauwhede	For contributions to design of secure integrated circuits and systems
2013	Jie Yang	For contributions to multimodal human-computer interaction
2013	Zhi-Hua Zhou	For contributions to learning systems in data mining and pattern recognition
2014	Brice Achkir	For contributions to diagnostics of physical layer design in gigabit digital transmission systems
2014	Gustavo Alonso	For contributions to data management and distributed systems
2014	Krste Asanović	For contributions to computer architecture
2014	Nader Bagherzadeh	For contributions to the design and analysis of coarse-grained reconfigurable processor architectures
2014	Chandrajit Bajaj	For contributions to image processing, scientific visualization, and computational biology
2014	Kathleen Carley	For contributions to multi-dimensional human and cyber dynamic networks
2014	Kwok Cheung	For development and implementation of energy and market management systems for control centers
2014	Manuel Dabreu	For contributions to the design of resilient manufacturing processes for electronic products
2014	Sujit Dey	For contributions to the design and testing of low-power systems and system-on-chips
2014	David Doermann	For contributions to research and development of automatic analysis and processing of document page imaging
2014	Alejandro Frangi Caregnato	For contributions to medical image analysis and image-based computational physiology
2014	Phillip Gibbons	For contributions to parallel computing and databases
2014	Garth Gibson	For contributions to the performance and reliability of transformative storage systems
2014	Ramesh Govindan	For contributions to computer networking applied to sensor networks
2014	Adolfo Guzmán Arenas	For contributions to consistent labeling for 3-D object recognition
2014	John Heidemann	For contributions to sensor networks, internet measurement and simulation
2014	Thomas Hou	For contributions to modeling and optimization of wireless networks
2014	Kazunari Ishimaru	For contributions to static random access memory and complementary metal-oxide semiconductor devices
2014	Weihua Jiang	For contributions to repetitive pulsed power generation utilizing solid-state device technology
2014	Christopher R. Johnson	For leadership in scientific computing and scientific visualization
2014	Mohan Kankanhalli	For contributions to multimedia content processing and security
2014	David Laidlaw	For contributions to data visualization and analytics
2014	Daniel Menasce	For contributions to research and education in performance evaluation of computer systems
2014	Cecilia Metra	For contributions to the on-line testing and fault-tolerant design of digital circuits and systems
2014	Paolo Montuschi	For contributions to the theory and applications of digital arithmetic
2014	Fatih Porikli	For contributions to computer vision and video surveillance
2014	Padma Raghavan	For contributions to robust scalable sparse solvers and energy-efficient parallel scientific computing
2014	Umakishore Ramachandran	For contributions to programming idioms for parallel and distributed systems and design of scalable shared memory systems
2014	Marina Ruggieri	For contributions to millimeter-wave satellite communications
2014	Amir Said	For contributions to compression and processing of images and videos
2014	Cyrus Shahabi	For contributions to the fields of multimedia, geospatial and distributed databases
2014	Puneet Sharma	For contributions to the design of scalable networking, software defined networks and energy efficiency in data centers
2014	Toru Shimizu	For development of integrated multi-core microprocessors with large memories
2014	Sandeep Shukla	For contributions to applied probabilistic model checking for system design
2014	Ross Whitaker	For contributions to image and geometry processing, visualization, and medical image analysis
2014	Franco Zambonelli	For contributions to software engineering for self-adaptive and self-organizing systems
2015	Ewert Bengtsson	For contributions to quantitative microscopy and biomedical image analysis
2015	Ricardo Bianchini	For contributions to server and data center energy management
2015	Ken Birman	For leadership in distributed computing and management of distributed systems
2015	Aaron Bobick	For contributions to activity recognition in computer vision
2015	Rajkumar Buyya	For contributions to cloud computing
2015	Jiannong Cao	For contributions to distributed computing in mobile wireless networks
2015	Joseph Cavallaro	For contributions to VLSI architectures and algorithms for signal processing and wireless communications
2015	Elizabeth Chang	For contributions to industrial informatics and cyber physical systems
2015	Xiuzhen Cheng	For contributions to localization and detection in sensor networks
2015	Henrik I. Christensen	For contributions to estimation methods for robot localization and mapping
2015	Sajal K. Das	For contributions to parallel and distributed computing
2015	Dipankar Dasgupta	For contributions to immunological computation and bio-inspired cyber security
2015	Joseph C. Decuir	For contributions to computer graphics and video games
2015	Peter Dinda	For contributions to virtualization technologies in adaptive and parallel computing
2015	Henry Fuchs	For contributions to computer graphics, virtual and augmented reality
2015	Stephanie Forrest	For contributions to computer security systems based on biological principles
2015	Pascale Fung	For contributions to human-machine interactions
2015	Manimaran Govindarasu	For contributions to security of power grids
2015	Dan Halperin	For contributions to robust geometric algorithms for robotics and automation
2015	Constance Heitmeyer	For contributions to formal methods for modeling and analyzing software system requirements
2015	Joerg Henkel	For contributions to hardware/software codesign of embedded computing systems
2015	Jianying Hu	For contributions to pattern recognition in business and health analytics, and document analysis
2015	Hong Jiang	For contributions to computer memory hierarchy and storage systems
2015	Hong Jiang	For leadership in parallel multimedia computing architectures and systems
2015	Anupam Joshi	For contributions to security, privacy and data management in mobile and pervasive systems
2015	Christoforos Kozyrakis	For contributions to high-performance, energy-efficient and secure memory systems
2015	David Kriegman	For contributions to computer vision
2015	Deepa Kundur	For contributions to signal processing techniques for multimedia and cyber security
2015	Edmund Lam	For contributions to modeling and computational algorithms in imaging applications
2015	Baochun Li	For contributions to application-layer network protocols and network coding
2015	Keqin Li	For contributions to parallel and distributed computing
2015	Ling Liu	For contributions to scalable Internet data management and decentralized trust management
2015	Yunhao Liu	For contributions to wireless sensor networks and systems
2015	Wenjing Lou	For contributions to information and network security
2015	Diana Marculescu	For contributions to design and optimization of energy-aware computing systems
2015	Mei Hong	For contributions to software architecture and component-based software engineering
2015	Rasheek Rifaat	For contributions to protection of industrial power systems
2015	Eric Rotenberg	For contributions to the microarchitecture of high-performance and reliable microprocessors
2015	Ponnuswamy Sadayappan	For contributions to parallel programming tools for high-performance computing
2015	Michael Shebanow	For contributions to superscalar out-of-order processors
2015	Yoshihiro Shiroishi	For leadership in the development of high density magnetic recording technologies and devices
2015	Suresh Subramaniam	For contributions to optical network architectures, algorithms, and performance modeling
2015	Moti Yung	For contributions to cryptography
2016	David Abramson	For contributions to software tools for high performance, parallel, and distributed computing
2016	Kiyoharu Aizawa	For contributions to model-based coding and multimedia lifelogging
2016	David Atienza	For contributions to design methods and tools for multiprocessor systems on chip
2016	Ronald Azuma	For contributions to augmented reality
2016	Tracy Camp	For contributions to wireless networking
2016	Jinde Cao	For contributions to the analysis of neural networks
2016	Ümit Çatalyürek	For contributions to combinatorial scientific computing and parallel computing
2016	Shigang Chen	For contributions to quality of service provisioning and policy-based security management in computer networks
2016	Xilin Chen	For contributions to machine vision for facial image analysis and sign language recognition
2016	Armando Colombo	For contributions to industrial cyber-physical systems
2016	Lorrie Cranor	For contributions to privacy engineering
2016	Leila De Floriani	For contributions to geometric modeling and visualization
2016	Robert Deng	For contributions to security algorithms, protocols and systems
2016	Schahram Dustdar	For contributions to elastic computing for cloud applications
2016	Michael Franz	For contributions to just-in-time compilation and to computer security through compiler-generated software diversity
2016	Alan Gatherer	For contributions to systems-on-chip for 3G and 4G cellular systems
2016	Fernando Gomide	For contributions to fuzzy systems
2016	Gerhard Hancke	For contributions to wireless sensor networks
2016	Edwin Hancock	For contributions to pattern recognition and computer vision
2016	Larry Heck	For leadership in applications of machine learning to spoken and text language processing
2016	Gernot Heiser	For contributions to security and safety of operating systems
2016	Mahmut Kandemir	For contributions to compiler support for performance and energy optimization of computer architectures
2016	Mark Laubach	For leadership in design and standardization of cable modems
2016	Hui Lei	For contributions to scalable and dependable data access in distributed computing systems
2016	Xuemin Lin	For contributions to algorithmic paradigms for database technology
2016	Nenad Medvidovic	For contributions to the architecture of complex software systems
2016	Thyagarajan Nandagopal	For contributions to wireless network optimization, RFID systems, and network architectures
2016	Calton Pu	For contributions to system software specialization, information security, and services computing
2016	Wendi Heinzelman	For contributions to algorithms, protocols, and architectures for wireless sensor and mobile networks
2016	Kui Ren	For contributions to security and privacy in cloud computing and wireless networks
2016	Diane Thiede Rover	For contributions to active learning methods in engineering education
2016	Chris Rowen	For leadership in the development of microprocessors and reduced instruction set computers
2016	Jagannathan Sarangapani	For contributions to nonlinear discrete-time neural network adaptive control and applications
2016	Weisong Shi	For contributions to distributed systems and internet computing
2016	Matteo Sonza Reorda	For design of test algorithms for reliable circuits and system
2016	Qi Tian	For contributions to multimedia information retrieval
2016	Sarma Bala Vrudhula	For contributions to low-power and energy-efficient design of digital circuits and systems
2016	Daniel Zeng	For contributions to collaborative computing with applications to security informatics
2017	N. Asokan	For contributions to system security and privacy
2017	Valeria Bertacco	For contributions to computer-aided verification and reliable system design
2017	Michael J. Carey	For contributions to design and engineering of high-performance and concurrent database systems
2017	Edward Y. Chang	For contributions to scalable machine learning
2017	Edoardo Charbon	For contributions to solid-state single photon avalanche detectors and their applications in imaging
2017	Choi Ki-young	For contribution to low-power, real-time, and reconfigurable systems
2017	d Sorin Coțofană	For contributions to nanocomputing architectures and paradigms
2017	Robert K. Cunningham	For leadership in computer security
2017	Dov Dori	For contributions to model-based systems engineering and document analysis recognition
2017	Falko Dressler	For contributions to adaptive and self-organizing communication protocols in sensor and vehicular networks
2017	Sandhya Dwarkadas	For contributions to shared memory and reconfigurability
2017	Saman Halgamuge	For contributions to computational intelligence in bioinformatics and mechatronics
2017	Jean-Michel Muller	For contributions to theory and applications of computer arithmetic
2017	Bernt Schiele	For contributions to large-scale object recognition, human detection and pose estimation
2017	Cristina Silvano	For contributions to energy-efficient computer architectures
2017	Carol Smidts	For contributions to reliability analysis of high-assurance systems
2017	Sabine Susstrunk	For contributions to computational imaging, color image processing, and color computer vision
2017	Jeffrey Vetter	For contributions to high performance computing
2018	Anastasia Ailamaki	For contributions to hardware-conscious database systems and scientific data management
2018	Marco Caccamo	For contributions to the theory and applications of hard real-time multicore computing
2018	L. Jean Camp	For research in human-centered risk and security
2018	Carla Chiasserini	For contributions to energy efficiency and cooperation in wireless networks
2018	Ewa Deelman	For contributions to scientific workflow management
2018	Steven K. Feiner	For contributions to augmented reality and computer graphics
2018	Pan Hui	For contributions to social-based opportunistic networks
2018	Jiaya Jia	For contributions to deblurring techniques in computational photography
2018	Roberta Klatzky	For contributions to human visual, auditory, and haptic perception in robotics and virtual environments
2018	Susan K. Land	For leadership in software product development
2018	Konstantina Nikita	For contributions to bioelectromagnetics and implantable antennas for medical applications
2018	Hidetoshi Onodera	For contributions to variation-aware design and analysis of integrated circuits
2018	Hairong Qi	For contributions to collaborative signal processing in sensor networks
2018	Salvatore Stolfo	For contributions to machine learning-based computer security
2018	Mark Tehranipoor	For contributions to integrated circuits security and trust
2018	John Tsotsos	For contributions to active vision and computational models of visual attention
2018	Rebecca N. Wright	For contributions to applied cryptography and privacy
2018	Tao Xie	For contributions to software testing and analytics
2019	Edward Adelson	For contributions to image representation and analysis in computer vision
2019	Michael Backes	For contributions to computer security and privacy
2019	Kerstin Dautenhahn	For contributions to social robotics and human-robot interaction
2019	Simson Garfinkel	For contributions to digital forensics and computer security
2019	Gang Hua	For contributions to facial recognition in images and videos
2019	Tingwen Huang	For contributions to dynamical analysis of neural networks
2019	Irwin King	For contributions to the theory and applications of machine learning in social computing
2019	Farinaz Koushanfar	For contributions to hardware and embedded systems security and to privacy-preserving computing
2019	Hai Li	For contributions to neuromorphic computing systems
2019	Cristina Lopes	For contributions to ubiquitous and immersive programming
2019	Onur Mutlu	For contributions to computer architecture research and practice
2019	Mary Ellen Randall	For leadership in the development and commercialization of audio-video decoders
2019	Mei-Ling Shyu	For contributions to multimedia big data analytics and management
2019	Ramesh Sitaraman	For contributions to content delivery, internet performance, and distributed systems
2019	Ming-Hsuan Yang	For contributions to object tracking and face recognition
2019	Lin Zhong	For contributions to the development of energy-efficient driver circuits for organic light-emitting diodes
2019	Michael Zyda	For contributions to game design and networking
2020	Hussein Abbass	For contributions to evolutionary learning and optimization
2020	Yingying Chen	For contributions to mobile computing and mobile security
2020	Carolina Cruz-Neira	For contributions to virtual reality
2020	Gautam Das	For contributions to search and ranking in databases and deep web querying
2020	Shlomi Dolev	For contributions to distributed computing and self-stabilization
2020	Ashutosh Dutta	For leadership in mobility management and security monitoring in mobile networks
2020	Ian Foster	For contributions to grid computing and data transport infrastructures
2020	Johannes Gehrke	For contributions to data mining and data management systems
2020	Mary Hall	For contributions to compiler optimization and performance tuning
2020	Rose Hu	For contributions to design and analysis of mobile wireless communications systems
2020	Weijia Jia	For contributions to optimal network routing and deployment
2020	William Kaiser	For contributions to wireless sensor network technology and its applications to advancing healthcare
2020	Ramesh Karri	For contributions to and leadership in trustworthy hardware
2020	Sven Koenig	For contributions to search algorithms and multi-agent coordination
2020	Steve Liu	For contributions to power and performance management of data centers and networked servers
2020	Marc Najork	For contributions to web crawling and web data processing
2020	Evgenia Smirni	For contributions to modeling and performance forecasting of complex systems
2020	Jiang Xie	For contributions to mobility and resource management of wireless networks
2021	Natalie Enright Jerger	For contributions to networks-on-chip for many-core architectures
2021	Yolanda Gil	For contributions to geoscience and scientific discovery with intelligent workflow systems
2021	Wolfgang Heidrich	For contributions to high dynamic range display and computational cameras
2021	Ayanna Howard	For contributions to human-robot interaction systems
2021	Kimberly Keeton	For contributions to storage and memory systems
2021	Kyoung Mu Lee	For contributions to image restoration and visual tracking
2021	Wonjun Lee	For contributions to multiple access and resource allocation in wireless networks
2021	Shixia Liu	For contributions to visual text analysis and visual model analysis
2021	Prabhat Mishra	For contributions to system-on-chip validation and design automation of embedded systems
2021	Katherine Morse	For contributions to standardization of simulation technologies
2021	Ai-Chun Pang	For contributions to resource management and service provisioning for mobile edge networks
2021	Julia Schnabel	For contributions to medical image computing
2021	Eve Schooler	For contributions to multimedia protocols and internet standards
2021	Richa Singh	For contributions to robust and secure biometrics
2021	Willy Susilo	For contributions to cloud computing security
2021	My T. Thai	For contributions to modeling, design, and optimization of networked systems
2021	Honggang Wang	For contributions to low power wireless for IoT and multimedia applications
2022	Suparna Bhattacharya	For contributions to Linux kernel for enterprise and advanced data processing systems
2022	M. Brian Blake	For contributions to web-based software engineering
2022	Anita Carleton	For leadership in the advancement of software measurement and practices
2022	Tarek El-Bawab	For contributions to the definition, recognition, accreditation criteria, and program development of modern network-engineering education
2022	Bonnie Ferri	For contributions to hands-on learning and leadership in higher education
2022	Giancarlo Fortino	For contributions to Engineering of IoT-enabled Wearable Computing Systems
2022	Xiaoming Fu	For contributions to resource management in edge computing and networking
2022	Torsten Hoefler	For significant contributions to large-scale parallel processing systems and supercomputers.
2022	Yusheng Ji	For contribution to distributed computing in mobile and dynamic systems
2022	Admela Jukan	For contributions to optical communications and networking
2022	Latifur Khan	For contributions to stream analytics and ontology for big data
2022	Fei-fei Li	For contributions to database query processing and optimization, and to cloud database systems
2022	Robyn Lutz	For contributions to software requirements for safety-critical systems
2022	Sudip Misra	For contributions to intelligent sensing in constrained IoT environments
2022	Isaac Nassi	For leadership in parallel and distributed systems and adaptive systems
2022	May Wang	For contributions to biomedical informatics and AI
2022	Cathy H. Wu	For contributions to computational biology and data science
2022	Xing Xie	For contributions to spatial data mining and recommendation systems
2022	Li Xiong	For contributions to privacy preserving and secure data sharing
2023	Gail-Joon Ahn	For development of applications of information and systems security
2023	Kemal Akkaya	For contributions to routing and topology management in wireless ad hoc and sensor networks
2023	Vijay Atluri	For contributions to security and privacy for data and workflow systems
2023	Mark Billinghurst	For contributions to augmented and virtual reality
2023	Wei Ding	For contributions to data mining and Big Data research in scientific domains
2023	Juan E. Gilbert	For leadership in broadening participation in computing and contributions to accessible voting technologies
2023	Amar Gupta	For contributions to banking transactions and healthcare practice
2023	Zhi Jin	For significant contributions to knowledge-driven software development
2023	Carl Kesselman	For foundational contributions to technologies and applications of global distributed computing
2023	Tadayoshi Kohno	For contributions to cybersecurity
2023	Jia Li	For leadership in large-scale AI
2023	Tamara Munzner	For contributions to principles, processes, and design for visualization
2023	Sherief Reda	For contributions to energy-efficient and approximate computing
2023	Eunice Santos	For leadership in computational social networks
2023	Houbing Song	For contributions to big data analytics and integration of AI with Internet of Things
2023	Jianping Wang	For contributions to resiliency of complex systems
2023	Wei Wang	For contributions to data mining
2023	Danfeng Yao	For contributions to enterprise data security and high-precision vulnerability screening
2024	Terry Benzel	For leadership in establishing the field of cybersecurity experimentation
2024	Joan Feigenbaum	For contributions to trust-management systems and Internet algorithmics
2024	Hyesoon Kim	For contributions to resource modeling and partitioning in heterogeneous computing systems
2024	Dimitrios S. Nikolopoulos	For contributions to dynamic execution environments and multiprocessor memory management.
2025	Nalini Venkatasubramanian	For contributions to the foundations of adaptive software and its application in enhancing community safety
2025	Chuan Wu	For contributions to resource scheduling in cloud computing and distributed machine learning systems
2026	Sheelagh Carpendale	For contributions to empowerment and engagement through interactive data visualization
2026	Sabrina De Capitani di Vimercati	For contributions to access control, security, and trust management
2026	Yunsi Fei	For contributions in side-channel analysis, protection of computing accelerators, and robust security evaluation
2026	Dan Hao	For contributions to software testing and debugging
2026	Yingshu Li	For contributions to energy conservation and topology control in wireless networks
2026	Ingrid Moerman	For contributions to experiment-driven wireless research
2026	Farhana Sheikh	For contributions to digital signal processing and 2.5D/3D heterogeneous integration
2026	Yuanchun Shi	For contributions to research in natural human-computer interaction, and interdisciplinary IT-driven innovation
2026	Chia-Lin Yang	For contributions to cross-layer design methodologies in memory hierarchy and computing-in-memory systems
2026	Wei Zhang	For contributions to agile design flow for FPGA and software-hardware co-design for embedded system security

== See also ==
- List of IEEE Fellows
