= Tomás Lang =

Computer scientist, author and university professor

Tomas Lang
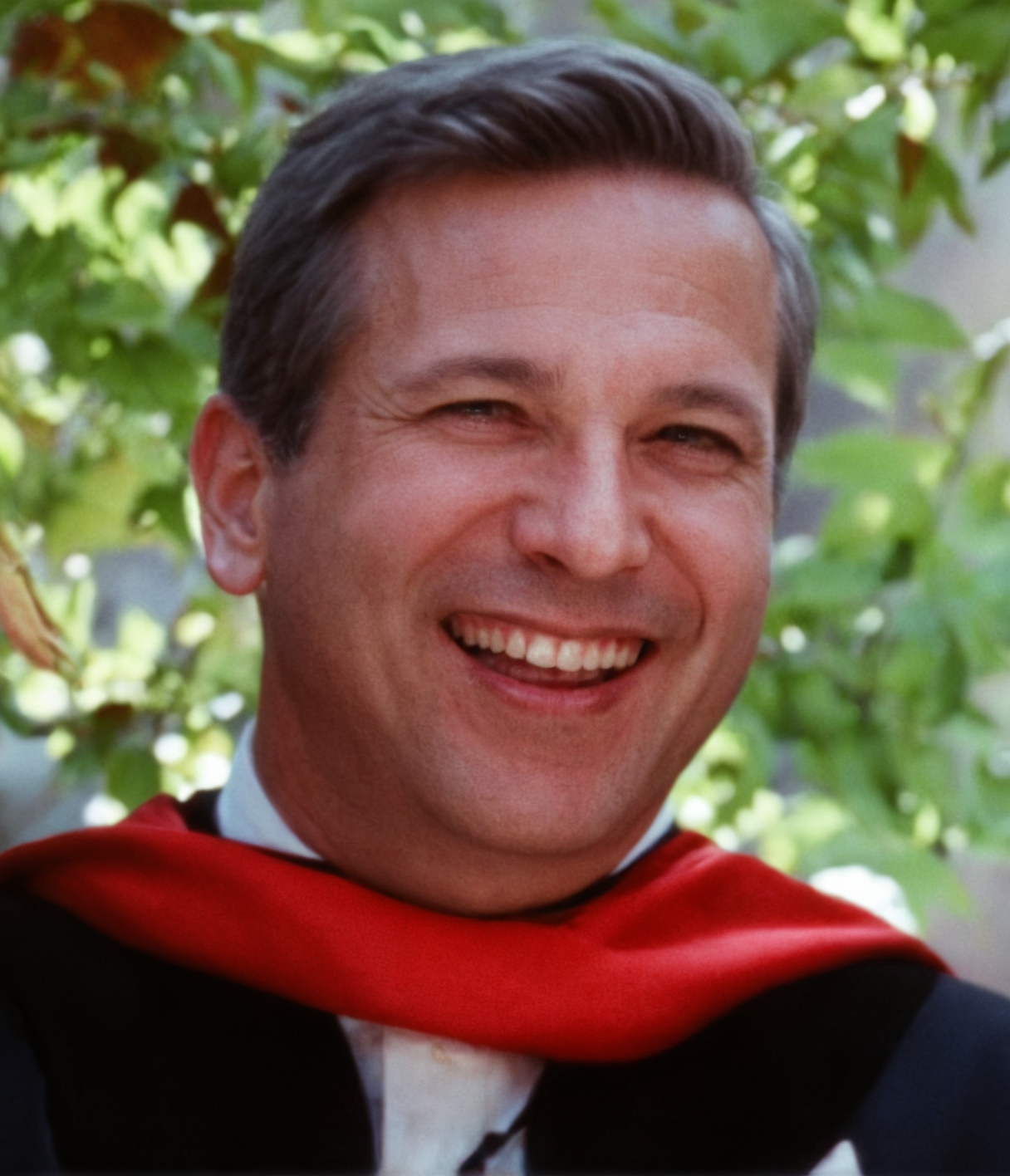
- Born: March 28, 1938; Teplice; Czechoslovakia
- Died: April 7, 2018 (aged 80)
- Education: Stanford University; University of California Berkeley; University of Chile
- Scientific career
- Workplaces: University of California Irvine; University of California Los Angeles; Polytechnic University of Catalonia; University of Chile

Tomás Lang (March 29, 1938 – April 7, 2018) was a computer scientist and university professor whose research and teaching spanned various areas of computer science, with emphasis on computer arithmetic, digital design, vector computers and computer system architecture.

== Career ==
Lang's legacy was celebrated at a workshop established in his name entitled TOMAS2025 held at the University of Chile, in Santiago, Chile, on October 23, 2025. The celebratory session at this workshop included participation and messages by collaborators and former students from multiple locations across the world.

Lang was an active member of the computer arithmetic community, in particular the ARITH Symposium, community that has praised his lasting impact in their field.

Lang's academic career took place at the Department of Computer Science, University of California Los Angeles (UCLA, 1974 to 1978), the Polytechnic University of Catalonia, Barcelona, Spain (UPC, 1978 to 1982), at UCLA (1982 to 1991), and at the Department of Electrical Engineering and Computer Science (EECS), University of California Irvine (UCI, 1991 to 2009). In 2010, Lang became Professor Emeritus at UCI.

At the Polytechnic University of Catalonia (UPC), Lang led a group of faculty at a newly created Department of Computer Architecture (DAC). Lang was the first Director of this department, institution that later played a decisive role in creating the Barcelona Supercomputing Center (BSC-CNS), as described by Dr. Mateo Valero, BSC Director, who refers to Lang as the seminal person that enabled the research group at UPC to establish BSC-CNS.

Lang had a close collaboration with Milos Ercegovac; together, they co-authored the research books Digital Arithmetic released in 2003 by Morgan Kaufmann/Elsevier, and Division and Square Root: Digit-Recurrence Algorithms and Implementations released in 1994 by Kluwer Academic Publishers. The book Digital Arithmetic has over 1440 citations according to the Google Scholar entry.

Lang also co-authored the textbook Introduction to Digital Systems released in 1999 by John Wiley & Sons including companion material for teaching, book that was translated to Portuguese, Chinese, and also released as an international edition in South Asia. Lang also co-authored the textbook Digital Systems and Hardware/Firmware Algorithms released in 1985, and the research monograph Matrix Computations on Systolic-Type Arrays published in 1992.

In addition to the aforementioned books, the scholar contributions from Lang and his collaborators are covered in over two hundred publications.

Lang received a Professional Engineering degree in Electrical Engineering from Universidad de Chile in 1965, MS degree from the University of California, Berkeley in 1966, and a PhD degree from Stanford University in 1974.
