= James H. Anderson =

James H. Anderson may refer to:

- James H. Anderson (computer scientist), American computer scientist
- James H. Anderson (politician) (1878–1936), Lieutenant Governor of Delaware in the 1920s
- James Hodson Anderson (1909–1996), Nebraska Attorney General
- James Anderson (defense official), American government official
