= Liu Ling =

Liu Ling or Ling Liu may refer to:

- Liu Ling (Han dynasty) (died 122 BC), Han dynasty princess, Liu An's daughter
- Liu Ling (poet) (221–300), Cao Wei and Jin dynasty poet and scholar, one of Seven Sages of the Bamboo Grove
- Ling Liu (computer scientist), Chinese-born computer scientist at Georgia Institute of Technology, USA
