= Shiroishi =

Shiroishi may refer to:

== Places ==
- Higashi-Shiroishi Station is a railway station in the city of Shiroishi, Miyagi Prefecture, Japan
- Hizen-Shiroishi Station is a passenger railway station
- Shiroishi Castle is a flatland-style Japanese castle
- Shiroishi Inariyama Kofun is a Kofun period burial mound
- Shiroishi, Miyagi is a city in Miyagi Prefecture, Japan
- Shiroishi, Saga is a town located in south-central Saga Prefecture, Japan
- Shiroishi Station (Kumamoto) is a railway station on the Hisatsu Line in Ashikita, Kumamoto
- Shiroishi Station (Miyagi) is a railway station in the city of Shiroishi, Miyagi Prefecture, Japan
- Shiroishi Station (JR Hokkaido) is a railway station in Shiroishi-ku, Sapporo, Hokkaido, Japan
- Shiroishi Station (Sapporo Municipal Subway) is a Sapporo Municipal Subway station
- Shiroishi-ku, Sapporo is one of the ten wards in Sapporo, Hokkaido, Japan
- Shiroishi-Zaō Station is a railway station in the city of Shiroishi, Miyagi, Japan

== People ==
- Munezane Shiroishi (白石 宗実; 1553?–1599), Japanese samurai of the Sengoku period
- Noriyuki Shiroishi (城石 憲之; born 1973), Japanese former Nippon Professional Baseball infielder
- Sato Shiroishi (白石 さと; born 1992), Japanese handball player
- Yoshihiro Shiroishi (born 1951), Japanese Chief Architect and Technical Advisor

== See also ==
- Siege of Shiroishi
