= Xiaoqing =

Xiaoqing may refer to:

- Xiaoqing (character), a character in the Chinese Legend of the White Snake
- Xiaoqing River, a river in Shandong, China

== People with the given name ==
- Liu Xiaoqing (born 1951), Chinese actress
- Zuo Xiaoqing (born 1977), Chinese actress
- Lim Xiaoqing (born 1967), Chinese-Swedish badminton player
- Li Xiaoqing (born 1995), Chinese handball player
- Xiaoqing Wen

== See also ==
- Xiao Qing (862–930?), government official of the Tang, Later Liang and Later Tang dynasties
