= Jean-Michel Muller =

French computer scientist (born 1961)

- Born: 1961 (age 64–65)
- Occupation: Computer scientist at CNRS
- Awards: Grand Prix Inria - Académie des sciences 2025.; IEEE fellow, 2013; CNRS Silver Medal, 2013; Prix La Recherche 2013; 2nd Seymour Cray France award, 1991; CNRS Bronze Medal, 1990

Academic background
- Education: Ensimag
- Thesis: Méthodologies de calcul des fonctions élémentaires (1985)
- Doctoral advisor: fr:Michel Cosnard

Academic work
- Discipline: Computer science
- Institutions: CNRS, École Normale Supérieure de Lyon, Inria
- Main interests: computer arithmetic, elementary function, floating-point arithmetic

Jean-Michel Muller (born 1961) is a French mathematician and computer scientist working in the field of computer arithmetic.

He is known for his early work on online arithmetic, in particular the BKM algorithm, for his influential work on the correct rounding of elementary functions, in particular on the Table Maker's Dilemma, and for having authored two reference textbooks: Elementary Functions: algorithms and implementation (first edition in 1997) and the Handbook of Floating Point Arithmetic (first edition in 2010).

== Education and career ==
Born in 1961, Jean-Michel Muller holds an engineering degree from ENSIMAG. He defended his PhD Methodologies for Calculating Elementary Functions in 1985 at the Institut National Polytechnique de Grenoble. He is currently a CNRS Research Director at LIP, the computer science laboratory at Ecole Normale Supérieure de Lyon. He was head of the LIP between 2001 and 2006.

He obtained a CNRS Bronze Medal in 1990, the 2nd Seymour Cray France award in 1991, the CNRS Silver Medal in 2013 and the Prix La Recherche in 2013. He became an IEEE Fellow in 2017. He was awarded the Grand Prix Inria - Académie des sciences in 2025.

== Involvement in the computer arithmetic community ==
Jean-Michel Muller has been very active in the development and animation of the computer arithmetic community: in France he created and lead a team of mathematicians and computer scientists, with the vision of gathering all aspects of computer arithmetic, from hardware to software and formal proofs. Internationally, he has been general chair of the ARITH International Symposium on Computer Arithmetic in 1991, in 1999, and in 2015, and general chair of the International Symposium on Scientific Computing, Computer Arithmetic, and Validated Numerics in 1997. He also served on the ARITH steering committee board.
