= Tian Qi =

Tian Qi or Tianqi may refer to:

== History ==
- Qi (state) (c. 1046–221 BC) after the Usurpation of Qi by Tian (c. 481–379 BC)
- Tianqi (558–560), era name of Xiao Zhuang (548–577?) of the Liang dynasty
- Tianqi (1620–1627), era name of the Tianqi Emperor (1605–1627) of the Ming dynasty

== Modern people ==
- Qi Tian, researcher at the University of Texas at San Antonio

== Other topics ==
- Panax notoginseng, known as tianqi in Chinese, a species of the genus Panax widely used in traditional Chinese medicine
- Tianqi porcelain
- Tianqi Lithium, Chinese mining and manufacturing company
