= Alexander Sawchuk =

American electrical engineer (born 1945)

Alexander A. Sawchuk (born 1945) is an American electrical engineer.

A native of Washington, D. C., Sawchuk earned a Bachelor of Science in electrical engineering from the Massachusetts Institute of Technology, followed by a Master of Science and PhD in the same field at Stanford University. Sawchuk joined the faculty of the University of Southern California in 1971. Between 2005 and 2012, he was systems chair of USC's Ming Hsieh Department of Electrical and Computer Engineering. Upon retirement, Sawchuk was granted emeritus status and is listed on the USC Viterbi School of Engineering website as the Leonard Silverman Chair Professor Emeritus.

Optica elected Sawchuk to fellowship status in 1980, and awarded the Stephen D. Fantone Distinguished Service Award to him in 2004. Sawchuk is a member of the 1982 class of SPIE fellows, and a 1994 fellow of the IEEE Computing Society.
