= Aravind Srinivasan =

Professor of computer science

- Born: 1968 (age 57–58); India
- Education: Indian Institute of Technology Madras; Cornell University
- Known for: Randomized algorithms, algorithmic fairness, networks, computational epidemiology
- Awards: AMS Fellow (2019); ACM Fellow (2014); IEEE Fellow (2010); Dijkstra Prize; Danny Lewin Award
- Scientific career
- Fields: Computer science, algorithms, probabilistic methods, data science
- Workplaces: University of Maryland, College Park
- Doctoral advisor: David Shmoys
- Website: https://www.cs.umd.edu/~srin/

Aravind Srinivasan (born 1968) is a Distinguished University Professor of computer science at the University of Maryland, College Park, with simultaneous appointments in the Department of Computer Science, UMIACS (University of Maryland Institute for Advanced Computer Studies), and AMSC. His research focuses on algorithms particularly randomized and probabilistic methods and their applications in fields ranging from machine learning, data science, health, and algorithmic fairness to networks, cloud computing, and sustainable systems.

== Education and academic career ==
Srinivasan earned his B.Tech. from Indian Institute of Technology Madras (1989) and his M.S. and Ph.D. in Computer Science from Cornell University (1993). He conducted postdoctoral research at the Institute for Advanced Study (Princeton) and DIMACS at Rutgers, worked at the National University of Singapore and in industrial research at Bell Labs, and joined the University of Maryland faculty in the early 2000s.

== Research ==
His research spans machine learning, randomized and probabilistic algorithms, combinatorial and continuous optimization, and applications in computational epidemiology, genomics, Internet economy, social networks, energy systems, and fairness in AI.

He has held editorial leadership roles, serving as Editor‑in‑Chief of ACM Transactions on Algorithms (2014–2020), Managing Editor/Editor of Theory of Computing (2006–2019), Editor of Journal of Discrete Algorithms (Elsevier) (2004–2012) and as an Editor for the Journal of the IISc

== Honors and awards ==
- Recipient of the SIGKDD Test of Time Award (2025)
- Fellows of ACM (2014), IEEE (2010), AAAS (2012), AMS (2019), EATCS (2017) and SIAM (2020)
- Distinguished Alumnus Award from IIT Madras (2016)
- Co-recipient of the Dijkstra Prize and Danny Lewin Award
- Distinguished University Professor, University of Maryland (2020)

== Selected publications ==
=== Articles ===
- Eubank, Stephen; Guclu, Hasan; Anil Kumar, V. S.; Marathe, Madhav V.; Srinivasan, Aravind; Toroczkai, Zoltán; Wang, Nan (13 May 2004). "Modelling disease outbreaks in realistic urban social networks". Nature. 429 (6988): 180–184. Bibcode:2004Natur.429..180E. doi:10.1038/nature02541. PMID 15141212.
- Han, Bo; Hui, Pan; Kumar, V.S. Anil; Marathe, Madhav V.; Shao, Jianhua; Srinivasan, Aravind (May 2012). "Mobile Data Offloading through Opportunistic Communications and Social Participation". IEEE Transactions on Mobile Computing. 11 (5): 821–834. Bibcode:2012ITMC...11..821H. doi:10.1109/TMC.2011.101.
- Schmidt, Jeanette P.; Siegel, Alan; Srinivasan, Aravind (May 1995). "Chernoff–Hoeffding Bounds for Applications with Limited Independence". SIAM Journal on Discrete Mathematics. 8 (2): 223–250. doi:10.1137/S089548019223872X.
- Gandhi, R.; Khuller, S.; Parathasarathy, S.; Srinivasan, A. (May 2006). "Dependent Rounding and its Applications to Approximation Algorithms". Journal of the ACM. 53 (3): 324–360. doi:10.1145/1147954.1147956.

=== Patents ===
- Systems and methods for mapping a term to a vector representation in a semantic space.
- Allocation of workloads in dynamic worker fleet.
- Fast and scalable approximation methods for finding minimum cost flows with shared recovery strategies, and system using same.
