= Li Xiong (computer scientist) =

Chinese-American computer scientist

Li Xiong (Chinese: 熊莉) is a Chinese-American computer scientist whose research involves federated learning, differential privacy, reputation systems, and the applications of artificial intelligence in healthcare. She is Samuel Candler Dobbs Professor of Computer Science and a professor of biomedical informatics at Emory University.

== Education and career ==
Xiong is originally from Wuhan. She earned a bachelor's degree in computer science in 1997 at the University of Science and Technology of China, and came to Johns Hopkins University for doctoral study in computer science, but instead left the program in 1999 with a master's degree. After working as a software engineer from 1999 to 2001, she returned to graduate study, and completed her Ph.D. in computer science in 2005 at Georgia Tech. Her doctoral dissertation, Resilient Reputation and Trust Management: Models and Techniques, was supervised by Ling Liu.

She joined Emory University as an assistant professor of mathematics and computer science in 2005. She was promoted to associate professor, and added an affiliation with the Emory Department of Biomedical Informatics, in 2012. From 2015 to 2018 she was Winship Distinguished Research Professor, and in 2016 she was promoted to full professor. In 2018 the Emory Department of Mathematics and Computer Science split into two separate departments, and Xiong remained on the computer science side of the split, subsequently becoming Samuel Candler Dobbs Professor of Computer Science.

== Recognition ==
Xiong was elected an IEEE Fellow in 2022, AAAS Fellow in 2024, and ACM Fellow in 2025 for "contributions to privacy preserving and secure data sharing".
