= Edmund Lam =

Edmund Y. Lam is a Chinese professor and associate dean of engineering at the University of Hong Kong.

== Early life and career ==
Edmund had obtained his BS, MS and Ph.D. in electrical engineering from Stanford University School of Engineering in 2000 and studied there under guidance from Joseph W. Goodman. From 2010 to 2011 he was a visiting associate professor at the Massachusetts Institute of Technology and prior to it, from 2001 to 2002 worked at the KLA-Tencor. Currently he serves as an associate dean of engineering at the University of Hong Kong where he was since 2002.

== Fellowships ==
- 2013 - Society of Photo-optical Instrumentation Engineers (SPIE), for achievements in computational lithography, digital, biomedical, and electronic imaging.
- 2013 - Optical Society of America (OSA), for significant and sustained contributions to computational optics and imaging, in particular the development of image reconstruction algorithms for various applications
- 2015 - Fellow of the IEEE, for contributions to modeling and computational algorithms in imaging applications.
- 2017 - Society for Imaging Science and Technology (IS&T), for outstanding contributions in image analysis, lithographic imaging, and biomedical imaging.
