= Fabio Roli =

Fabio Roli is a Full Professor of Computer Engineering at the University of Genova, he previously was with the University of Cagliari, Italy. He is the Founding Director of the Pattern Recognition and Applications laboratory at the University of Cagliari. He is the Director of the sAIfer Lab, a research laboratory on safety and security of artificial intelligence. He was named Fellow of the Institute of Electrical and Electronics Engineers (IEEE) in 2012 for contributions to multiple classifier systems. Roli was also named a fellow of the International Association for Pattern Recognition in 2004 for contributions to pattern recognition and its applications and multiple classifier systems. He is a recipient of the Pierre Devijver Award for his contributions to statistical pattern recognition.
