= Jerzy Tyszer =

Polish scientist

Jerzy Tyszer from the Poznań University of Technology, Poznań, Poland was named Fellow of the Institute of Electrical and Electronics Engineers (IEEE) in 2013 for contributions to digital VLSI circuit testing and test compression.
