= James H. Anderson (computer scientist) =

American computer scientist

- Education: Michigan State University (BS); Purdue University (MS); University of Texas at Austin (PhD)
- Occupation: Professor of Computer Science
- Scientific career
- Fields: Real-time systems
- Institutions: University of North Carolina at Chapel Hill (1993–present); University of Maryland (1990–1993)
- Thesis: Atomicity of Concurrent Programs (1990)
- Website: jamesanderson.web.unc.edu

James Hampton Anderson is a Kenan Distinguished Professor in the computer science department of the University of North Carolina at Chapel Hill. He was named a Fellow of the Institute of Electrical and Electronics Engineers (IEEE) Computer Society in 2012 "for contributions to the implementation of soft-real-time systems on multiprocessor and multicore platforms," and a Fellow of the Association for Computing Machinery (ACM) in 2013.
