= Daniel Menasce =

Daniel Menasce from the George Mason University was named Fellow of the Institute of Electrical and Electronics Engineers (IEEE) in 2014 for contributions to research and education in performance evaluation of computer systems.
