= Peter Dinda =

American electrical engineer

Peter Dinda is an American electrical engineer at Northwestern University, Evanston, Illinois . He was named Fellow of the Institute of Electrical and Electronics Engineers (IEEE) in 2015 for contributions to virtualization technologies in adaptive and parallel computing.
