= Matteo Sonza Reorda =

Italian electrical engineer

Matteo Sonza Reorda is an electrical engineer at the Politecnico di Torino, Italy. He was named a Fellow of the Institute of Electrical and Electronics Engineers (IEEE) in 2016 for his design of test algorithms for reliable circuits and systems. Actually he is the head of CAD - Electronic CAD & Reliabillity Group at Politecnico di Torino. He teaches Computer Architectures, Testing and Fault Tolerance, and many advanced courses at the Master's degree level.
