= Sarma Bala Vrudhula =

American computer engineer

Sarma Bala Vrudhula is a Professor of Computer Science and Engineering at Arizona State University, Tempe, Arizona. He was named Fellow of the Institute of Electrical and Electronics Engineers (IEEE) in 2016 for contributions to low-power and energy-efficient design of digital circuits and systems.

== Education ==
- Ph.D., Electrical and Computer Engineering, University of Southern California, 1985
- M.S., Electrical Engineering, University of Southern California, 1980
- B.Math., University of Waterloo, Ontario, Canada, 1976
