= Mark Tehranipoor =

Iranian American information technology researcher

Mark M. Tehranipoor
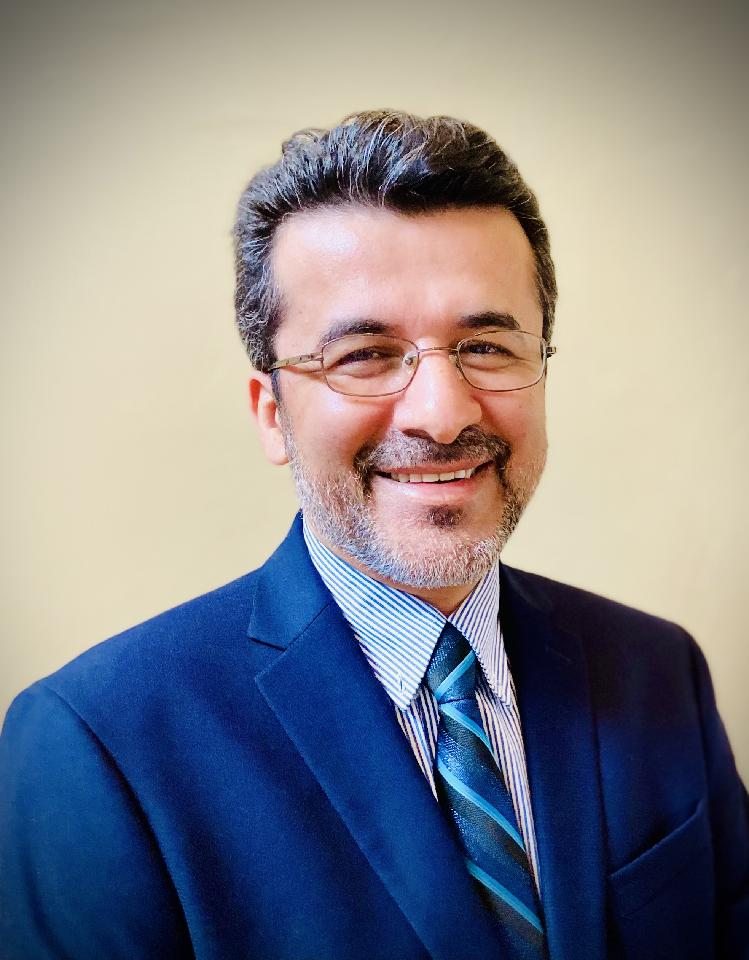
- Born: Iran
- Education: University of Texas at Dallas
- Awards: ACM Fellow; IEEE Fellow; NAI Fellow; HOST Hall of Fame Inductee; NSF CAREER Award; MURI Award on Nanoscale Security; SRC Aristotle
- Scientific career
- Fields: Hardware security Design for testing Electrical and Computer Engineering
- Workplaces: University of Florida (f.m.r) University of Connecticut (f.m.r) University of Maryland
- Website: tehranipoor.ece.ufl.edu/index.html

Mark M. Tehranipoor is an Iranian American academic researcher specializing in hardware security and trust, electronics supply chain security, IoT security, and reliable and testable VLSI design. He is the Intel Charles E. Young Preeminence Endowed Professor in Cybersecurity at the University of Florida and serves as the director of the Florida Institute for Cybersecurity Research. Since June 2022, he has served as the chair of the Department of Electrical and Computer Engineering at the University of Florida. He is a fellow of IEEE, ACM, and NAI as well as a Golden Core member of the IEEE. He is a co-founder of the International Symposium on Hardware Oriented Security and Trust (HOST). He is the recipient of the 2023 SRC Aristotle award. Tehranipoor also serves as a co-director of the Air Force Office of Scientific Research CYAN and MEST Centers of Excellence.

== Life ==
Tehranipoor earned a Bachelor of Science (B.S.) in Electrical Engineering from Tehran Polytechnic in 1997. After completing his Masters of Science (M.S.) in Electrical Engineering from the University of Tehran in 2000, he received the Texas Public Educational Grant and moved to the United States to pursue his Ph.D. in Electrical and Computer Engineering at the University of Texas at Dallas, completing the doctorate in two years and eight months.

He spent two years at the University of Maryland Baltimore as an assistant professor before moving to the University of Connecticut.

At UConn, he started to publish a series of books on Hardware Security, with the first being the Introduction to Hardware Security and Trust.

He initiated and established three centers of excellence in the area of hardware and cyber security; the Center for Hardware Assurance and Engineering (CHASE), Comcast Center of Excellence on Security Innovation (CSI), and the Connecticut Cybersecurity Center (C3).

He received the National Science Foundation (NSF) CAREER Award in 2008 and AFOSR MURI Award in 2014.

Later in 2015, Tehranipoor moved to the University of Florida, acquiring the title of Intel Charles E. Young Preeminence Endowed Professor in Cybersecurity. He serves as the director of the Florida Institute for Cybersecurity Research. He is an IEEE fellow, ACM fellow and a co-founder of the International Symposium on Hardware Oriented Security and Trust. Tehranipoor also serves as a co-director of the Air Force Office of Scientific Research CYAN and MEST Centers of Excellence. In June 2022, Tehranipoor became the chair of the Department of Electrical and Computer Engineering at the University of Florida.

== Publications and patents ==
Tehranipoor has published over 600 conference and journal papers, 19 books, and holds 22 patents, with at least 24 more pending.

=== Select Books ===
- Mark Tehranipoor, Emerging Topics in Hardware Security, Springer, 2020.
- Navid Asadi, Md. Tanjid Rahman and Mark M. Tehranipoor, Physical Assurance: For Electronic Devices and Systems, Springer, 2020.
- Swarup Bhunia and Mark M. Tehranipoor, Hardware Security: A Hands-on Learning Approach, Elsevier, Morgan Kaufmann imprint, 2018.
- M. Tehranipoor, D. Forte, G, Rose, and S. Bhunia, Security Opportunities in Nano Devices and Emerging Technologies, CRC Press, 2017.
- S. Bhunia and M. Tehranipoor, The Hardware Trojan War: Attacks, Myths, and Defenses, Springer, 2017.
- D. Forte, S. Bhunia, and M. Tehranipoor, Hardware Protection through Obfuscation, Springer, 2017.
- P. Mishra, S. Bhunia, and M. Tehranipoor, Hardware IP Security and Trust, Springer, 2017.
- M. Tehranipoor, U. Guin, and D. Forte, Counterfeit Integrated Circuits: Detection and Avoidance, Springer, 2015.
- M. Tehranipoor, H. Salmani, and X. Zhang, Integrated Circuit Authentication: Hardware Trojans and Counterfeit Detection, Springer, July 2013.
- M. Tehranipoor and C. Wang, Introduction to Hardware Security and Trust, Springer, August 2011.
- M. Tehranipoor, K. Peng, and K. Chakrabarty, Test and Diagnosis for Small-Delay Defects, Springer, September 2011.
- M. Tehranipoor, Emerging Nanotechnologies: Test, Defect Tolerance, and Reliability, Springer, November 2007.
- M. Tehranipoor and N. Ahmed, Nanometer Technology Designs: High-Quality Delay Tests, Springer, December 2007.

=== Select articles ===
- M. Tehranipoor and F. Koushanfar, "A Survey of Hardware Trojan Taxonomy and Detection," IEEE Design and Test of Computers, 2010.
- U. Guin, K. Huang, D. DiMase, J. Carulli, M. Tehranipoor, Y. Makris, "Counterfeit Integrated Circuits: A Rising Threat in the Global Semiconductor Supply Chain," Proceedings of IEEE, 2014.
- H. Salmani, M. Tehranipoor, and J. Plusquellic, "A Novel Technique for Improving Hardware Trojan Detection and Reducing Trojan Activation Time," IEEE Transactions on VLSI (TVLSI), 2012.
- X. Xu, B. Shakiya, M. Tehranipoor, and D. Forte, "Novel Bypass Attack and BDD-based Tradeoff Analysis Against all Known Logic Locking Attacks," Conference on Cryptographic Hardware and Embedded Systems (CHES), 2017.
- K. Xiao and M. Tehranipoor, "BISA: Built-In Self-Authentication for Preventing Hardware Trojan Insertion," Int. IEEE Symposium on Hardware-Oriented Security and Trust (HOST), 2013.
- A. Nahiyan, K. Xiao, D. Forte, Y. Jin, and M. Tehranipoor, "AVFSM: A Framework for Identifying and Mitigating Vulnerabilities in FSMs," Design Automation Conference (DAC), 2016.
- U. Guin, Q. Shi, D. Forte, and M. Tehranipoor, "FORTIS: A Comprehensive Solution for Establishing Forward Trust for Protecting IPs and ICs," ACM Transactions on Design Automation of Electronic Systems (TODAES), 2016.
- M. T. Rahman, M. S. Rahman, H. Wang, S. Tajik, W. Khalil, F. Farahmandi, D. Forte, N. Asadi, and M. Tehranipoor, "Defense-in-Depth: A Recipe for Logic Locking to Prevail," Integration, the VLSI Journal, 2020.

=== Select Patents ===
- Embedded ring oscillator network for integrated circuit security and threat detection, 2014, M. Tehranipoor, X. Wang, X. Zhang, US 8850608 B2, WO 2012122309 A3 (Grant)
- Methods and Systems for Hardware Piracy Prevention, 2014, M. Tehranipoor and N. Tuzzio, US9071428 B2 (Grant)
- Methods and Systems for Preventing Hardware Trojan Insertion, M. Tehranipoor and K. Xiao, US20140283147 A1 (Grant)
- Photon-Counting Security Tagging and Verification Using Optically Encoded QR Codes, B. Javidi, A. Markman, and M. Tehranipoor, US20150295711 A1 (Grant)
- UCR: An Unclonable Environmentally-Sensitive Chipless RFID Tag, Jan. 15, 2019, M. Tehranipoor, D. Forte, K. Yang, and H. Shen, 10181065 (Grant)
- Vanishing Via for Hardware IP Protection Against Reverse Engineering, 2017, S. Bhunia, M. Tehranipoor, D. Forte, N. Asadi, and H. Shen, 10283459 (Grant)
- Unclonable environmentally-sensitive chipless RFID tag with a plurality of slot resonators, 10181065, Mark Tehranipoor, Kun Yang, Haoting Shen, and Domenic Forte (Grant)
- Layout-Driven Method to Assess Vulnerability of ICs to Microprobing Attacks, M. Tehranipoor, D. Forte, N. Asadi, and Q. Shi, U.S. Patent No. 10,573,605 (Grant)
