= Rüdiger Dillmann =

- Born: Germany
- Education: Karlsruhe Institute of Technology
- Scientific career
- Fields: Robotics
- Workplaces: Karlsruhe Institute of Technology, FZI Forschungszentrum Informatik
- Doctoral advisor: Paul M. Frank

Rüdiger Dillmann is a German robotics researcher from Karlsruhe Institute of Technology (KIT, formerly known as University of Karlsruhe (TH)) in Karlsruhe, Germany. He was named Fellow of the Institute of Electrical and Electronics Engineers (IEEE) in 2012 for contributions to robot programming and human-centered technologies.

The computer science professor served as the chair of the 2013 International Conference on Robotics and Automation.
