= Elizabeth Chang =

Australian electrical engineer

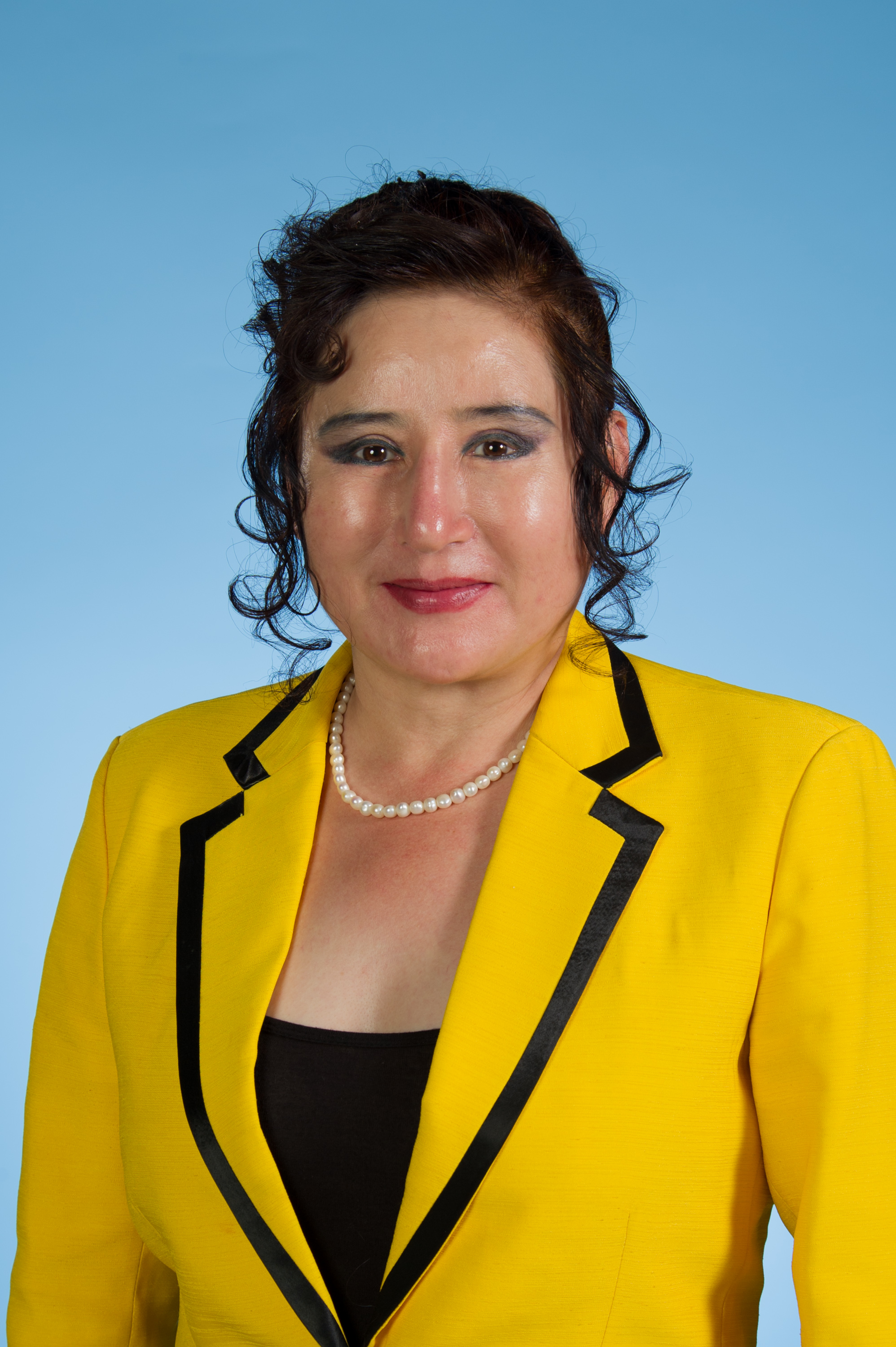
Elizabeth Chang, Professor in IT, Computer Science and Software Engineering

Elizabeth Chang is an electrical engineer at Curtin University in Perth, Western Australia. Chang was named a Fellow of the Institute of Electrical and Electronics Engineers (IEEE) in 2015 for her contributions to industrial informatics and cyber physical systems.

Chang holds a PhD in Computer Science and Software Engineering from La Trobe University.

Chang concentrates her research in biomedical engineering, and she has also gone to law school. During her time at law school, she was an extern for U.S. District Court James V. Selna, who is an American judge. At Curtin University, she also had Institute of Excellence for Digital Ecosystems and Business Intelligence Institute.

Chang has also co-authored two books, and has published more than 300 scientific papers as book chapters in journals. Her previous academic achievements also include 20 Competitive Research Grants.
