= Michael Shebanow =

American electrical engineer

Michael Shebanow is an electrical engineer at Samsung in San Jose, California. He was named a Fellow of the Institute of Electrical and Electronics Engineers (IEEE) in 2015 for his contributions to superscalar out-of-order processors.
