= Chia-Lin Yang =

Taiwanese computer scientist

Chia-Lin Yang is a Taiwanese computer scientist whose research concerns electronic design automation and embedded systems. She is a professor in the Department of Computer Science and Information Engineering at National Taiwan University.

== Education and career ==
Yang has a 1989 bachelor's degree in information and computer education from the National Taiwan Normal University in Taipei. After a 1992 master's degree in computer science from the University of Texas at Austin, she worked from 1993 until 1995 as a software engineer at VLSI Technology, Inc.

She completed her Ph.D. in computer science from Duke University in 2001. Her doctoral dissertation, The push architecture: A prefetching framework for linked data structures, was supervised by Alvin R. Lebeck.

She joined National Taiwan University as an assistant professor in 2001, and was promoted to associate professor in 2004 and full professor in 2009. She directed the office of international affairs in the College of Electrical Engineering and Computer Science from 2013 to 2014 and directed the Graduate Institute of Networking and Multimedia from 2016 to 2019.

She was chief scientist at the Taiwan AI Labs from 2019 to 2020, and has directed the Delta-NTU Joint Research Lab since 2020.

== Recognition ==
Yang was named to the 2026 class of IEEE Fellows, "for contributions to cross-layer design methodologies in memory hierarchy and computing-in-memory systems".
