= Sandhya Dwarkadas =

American computer scientist

Sandhya Dwarkadas is a professor and Chair of the Department of Computer Science at the University of Virginia. She was formerly the Albert Arendt Hopeman Professor of Engineering and Professor and Chair of the Department of Computer Science at the University of Rochester. She is known for her research on shared memory and reconfigurable computing.

== Education ==
Dwarkadas was educated at the Indian Institute of Technology Madras and Rice University, completing her Ph.D. at Rice in 1993. Her dissertation, Synchronization, Coherence, and Consistency for High Performance Shared-Memory Multiprocessing, was jointly supervised by J. Robert Jump and Bart Sinclair.

== Recognition ==
Dwarkadas became a fellow of the Institute of Electrical and Electronics Engineers in 2017. She was elected as an ACM Fellow in 2018 for "contributions to shared memory and reconfigurability".
