= Xilin Chen =

Chinese electrical engineer

Xilin Chen is a scientist from the Institute of Computing Technology in Beijing, China.

Chen was named Fellow of the Institute of Electrical and Electronics Engineers (IEEE) in 2016 for his contributions to machine vision for facial image analysis and sign language recognition. He was elected as an ACM Fellow in 2019 "for contributions to face and sign language recognition and multimedia systems". He also was elected as an IAPR Fellow for his significant contributions to image modeling and object recognition.
