= Robert Deng =

Robert Deng from the Singapore Management University, Singapore was named Fellow of the Institute of Electrical and Electronics Engineers (IEEE) in 2016 for contributions to security algorithms, protocols and systems.
