= Manimaran Govindarasu =

Manimaran Govindarasu is a Ross Martin Mehl and Marylyne Munas Mehl Professor of electrical and computer engineering at the Iowa State University. He holds B.E. in computer science and engineering from Bharathidasan University (1989), an MTech in computer technology from the Indian Institutes of Technology (1993), and Ph.D. in computer science and engineering from the Indian Institutes of Technology (1998). He was named Fellow of the Institute of Electrical and Electronics Engineers (IEEE) in 2015 for contributions to security of power grids.
