= Carol Smidts =

Belgian reliability engineer

Carol Sophie Smidts is a Belgian engineer who works in the US as a professor in the Department of Mechanical and Aerospace Engineering at Ohio State University, where she directs the Reliability and Risk Laboratory and the Nuclear Engineering Program. Her research focus is on reliability engineering and probabilistic risk assessment, originally for applications in nuclear engineering and more recently for applications in software engineering.

== Education and career ==
Smidts was a student of engineering physics at the Université libre de Bruxelles, where she earned a master's degree in 1986 and completed her Ph.D. in 1991.

After postdoctoral research at the Université libre de Bruxelles, the Joint Research Centre in Ispra, Italy, and the University of Maryland, College Park, she joined the University of Maryland Department of Materials & Nuclear Engineering as an assistant professor in 1994, and was promoted to associate professor there in 2000. In 2003 she moved to the Department of Mechanical Engineering at the University of Maryland, and in 2008 she moved to her present position at Ohio State University. She became director of the university's Nuclear Engineering Program in 2017.

== Recognition ==
Smidts was named as an IEEE Fellow in 2017 "for contributions to reliability analysis of high-assurance systems".
