= Suresh Subramaniam =

Suresh Subramaniam is a Department Chair and Professor of Engineering at the George Washington University School of Engineering and Applied Science in Washington, DC. He was named a Fellow of the Institute of Electrical and Electronics Engineers (IEEE) in 2015 for his contributions to optical network architectures, algorithms, and performance modeling.

Subramaniam got his B.E. degree from Anna University in 1988, M.S.E.E. from Tulane University in 1993, and Ph.D. from the University of Washington in 1997.
