= Insup Lee =

American computer scientist

Insup Lee is the Cecilia Fitler Moore Professor in the Department of Computer and Information Science at the University of Pennsylvania, United States. He is also the Director and co-founder of the PRECISE Center.

Lee obtained his B.S. in mathematics from the University of North Carolina at Chapel Hill in 1977, followed by his M.S. and Ph.D. in Computer Science at the University of Wisconsin-Madison in 1983. That same year, he joined the University of Pennsylvania as an assistant professor. Lee's research is predominantly focused on cyber-physical systems (CPS), real-time computing, high-confidence medical devices, formal methods and tools, and run-time verification. Much of his recent work has been related to CPS security, particularly for medical devices. Lee is also a Fellow of the ACM, IEEE, and AAAS.

== Awards and honors ==
- IEEE Technical Committee on Cyber-Physical Systems (TCCPS) Distinguished Leadership Award, 2023. For exceptional contributions to establishing cyber-physical systems as a scientific discipline and continued growth of the community; for pioneering research and leadership in medical cyber-physical systems.
- AAAS Fellow, 2022. For foundational contributions to the theory and implementation of real-time compositional scheduling and runtime verification.
- ACM SIGBED Inaugural Distinguished Leadership Award, 2022. For leadership in promoting cross-fertilization of ACM and IEEE communities in Cyber-Physical Systems, Embedded Systems, and Real-Time Systems.
- IEEE Life Fellow, 1 January 2021.
- Runtime Verification Test-of-Time Award, issued 2019 for ENTCS 2001 paper "Jav-MaC: Run-time Assurance Tool for Java Programs" (with Oleg Sokolsky, Sampath Kannan, Moonzoo Kim, and Mahesh Viswanathan).
- Deans' Distinguished Visiting Professorship, Perelman School of Medicine, University of Pennsylvania, 17 January 2019.
- ACM Fellow, 2017. For theoretical and practical contributions to compositional real-time scheduling and runtime verification.
- Member, NRC's Committee on 21st Century Cyber-Physical Systems Education, 2014-2015.
- Appreciation Plaque, Ministry of Science, IT and Future Planning, South Korea, 9 August 2013.
- IEEE TC-RTS Outstanding Technical Achievement and Leadership Award, issued Dec 2008.
- The Edward M. Kennedy Award for Health Care Innovation, issued by CIMIT in 2007 for the Medical Device “PnP” Interoperability Team - Julian Goldman (leader), Dave Arney, Insup Lee, et al.
- Member, President's Council of Advisors on Science and Technology (PCAST) Networking and Information Technology (NIT) Technical Advisory Group (TAG), 2006-2007.
- DVP Speaker of IEEE Computer Society Distinguished Visitors Program (DVP), 2004-2006.
- IEEE Fellow, 2001, For contributions to the specification languages and verification tools for real-time systems.
