= Julia Schnabel =

Computer imaging researcher

- Education: University College London (PhD); Technische Universität Berlin (Diplom)
- Scientific career
- Workplaces: King's College London; University of Oxford; University College London; Technical University of Munich; Helmholtz Zentrum München
- Thesis: Multi-scale active shape description in medical imaging (1998)
- Doctoral advisor: Simon R. Arridge
- Website: kclpure.kcl.ac.uk/portal/en/persons/julia-schnabel(1b0b41d0-b562-45c3-9d92-0f22f367203f).html; www.professoren.tum.de/en/schnabel-julia; www.helmholtz-munich.de/en/iml/pi/julia-schnabel

Julia A. Schnabel is Professor in Computational Imaging and AI in Medicine (TUM Liesel Beckmann Distinguished Professorship) at the Technical University of Munich, Director of the Institute of Machine Learning in Biomedical Imaging at Helmholtz Zentrum München (Helmholtz Distinguished Professorship), and Chair of Computational Imaging at the School of Biomedical Engineering and Imaging Sciences at King's College London. Previously, she was Associate Professor in Engineering Science (Medical Imaging) at the University of Oxford where she became Full Professor of Engineering Science in 2014.

== Education ==
Schnabel completed her Diplom (M.Sc. equiv.) in computer science at the Technische Universität Berlin in 1993, and her PhD in computer science at University College London in 1998. She held post-doctoral positions at University College London, King's College London, and at the University Medical Center Utrecht.

== Research ==
Schnabel's research interests are in machine learning for biomedical imaging, in particular nonlinear motion modelling, multi-modality, dynamic and quantitative imaging with applications in cancer, neuroimaging, cardiovascular diseases, and fetal health.

== Selected awards and honours ==
Schnabel is an elected member of the MICCAI Society Board (2017–2021) and a Technical Representative in the Administrative Committee of the IEEE Engineering in Medicine and Biology Society (2017–2019, re-elected 2020-2022). She has been a member of the Scientific board of the French Institute for Research in Computer Science and Automation (INRIA) from 2017 to 2019. Furthermore, she was a member of the EPSRC Healthcare Technologies Strategic Advisory Team. In 2018, Schnabel was awarded a MICCAI Fellowship which is given annually to "a small number of senior members of the society in recognition of substantial scientific contributions to the MICCAI research field and service to the MICCAI community". She was elected as Fellow of the European Laboratory for Learning and Intelligent Systems (ELLIS) for the ELLIS Health programme and as Fellow of the IEEE in 2021 "For contributions to medical image computing".
