= Josep Domingo Ferrer =

Josep Domingo-Ferrer
- Born: 1965 (age 59–60)
- Awards: IEEE Fellow
- Scientific career
- Fields: Computer science
- Institutions: Universitat Rovira i Virgili
- Website: crises-deim.urv.cat/jdomingo/

Josep Domingo Ferrer is a Distinguished Professor of Computer Science and an ICREA-Acadèmia Researcher at Universitat Rovira i Virgili, Tarragona, Catalonia, where he holds the UNESCO Chair in Data Privacy. He was named Fellow of the Institute of Electrical and Electronics Engineers (IEEE) in 2012 for contributions to privacy, security, and functionality in statistical databases.
