= Eric Rotenberg =

American electrical engineer

Eric Rotenberg from the North Carolina State University, Raleigh, NC was named Fellow of the Institute of Electrical and Electronics Engineers (IEEE) in 2015 for contributions to the microarchitecture of high-performance and reliable microprocessors.
