= Weiming Shen =

Academic background
- Education: Beijing Jiaotong University (BS, MS); University of Technology of Compiègne (PhD)

Academic work
- Discipline: Engineering
- Sub-discipline: Mechanical engineering Evolutionary computation Deep learning Computer-aided production engineering
- Institutions: Huazhong University of Science and Technology; University of Western Ontario; National Research Council Canada

Weiming Shen is Chinese engineer and academic working as a professor at the Huazhong University of Science and Technology and University of Western Ontario.

== Education ==
Shen earned Bachelor of Science and Master of Science degrees in mechanical engineering from Beijing Jiaotong University and a PhD in system control from the University of Technology of Compiègne.

== Career ==
Prior to 2019, Shen was a principal research officer with the National Research Council Canada He was named a Fellow of the Institute of Electrical and Electronics Engineers (IEEE) in 2013 for his contributions to agent-based collaboration technologies and applications. Shen is also a fellow of the Canadian Academy of Engineering.
