= Edoardo Charbon =

Swiss quantum engineer

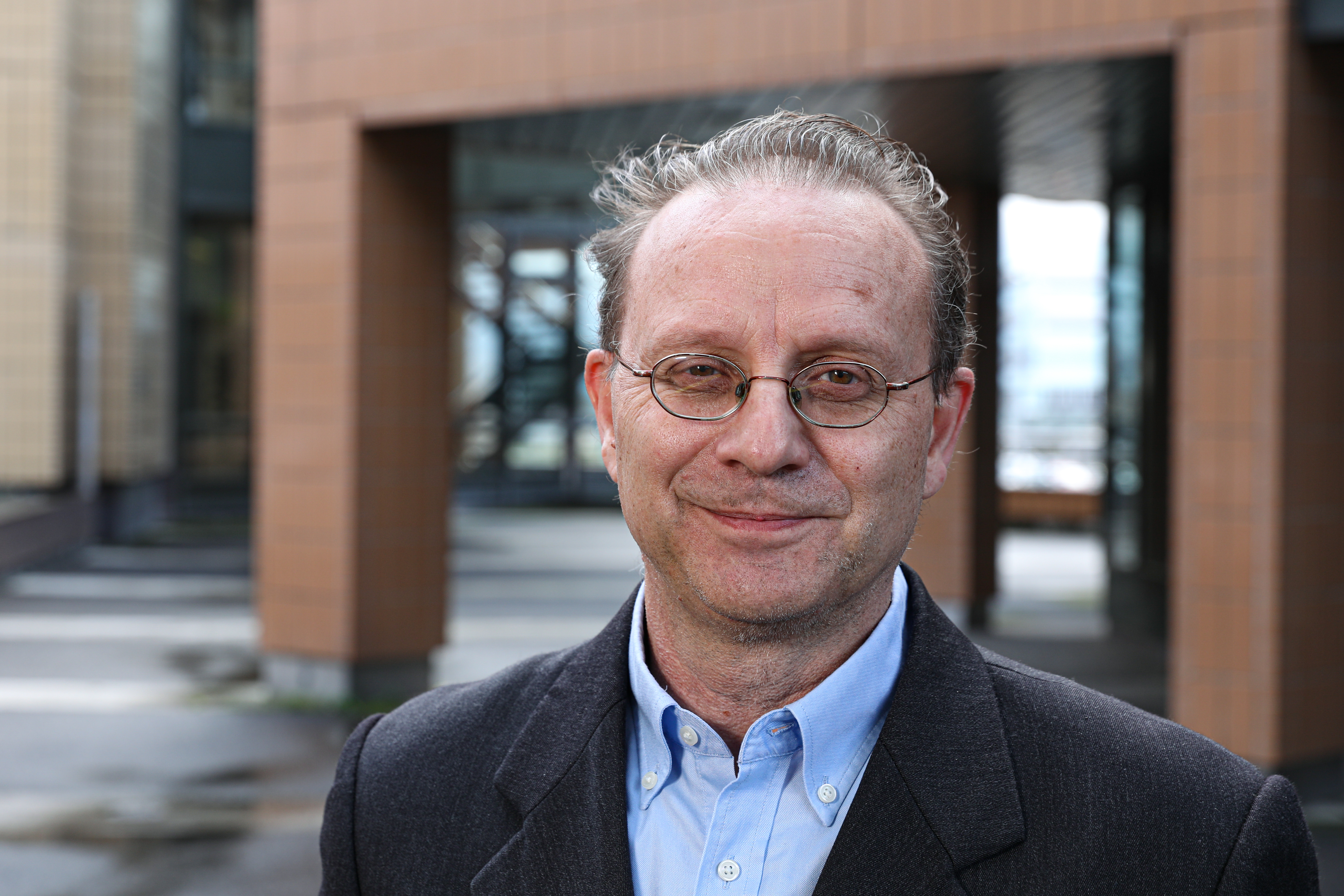
- Charbon in 2021
- Born: 1964 (age 61–62); Sorengo, Switzerland
- Education: ETH Zurich; University of California, San Diego; University of California, Berkeley
- Known for: CMOS Single-photon avalanche diodes CMOS SPAD image sensors Cryo-CMOS for quantum computing
- Scientific career
- Fields: Quantum electronics
- Workplaces: EPFL (École Polytechnique Fédérale de Lausanne)
- Website: https://aqua.epfl.ch

Edoardo Charbon (born 1964 in Sorengo, Switzerland) is a Swiss electrical engineer. He is a professor of quantum engineering at EPFL (École Polytechnique Fédérale de Lausanne) and the head of the Laboratory of Advanced Quantum Architecture (AQUA) at the School of Engineering.

== Career ==
Charbon was born and raised in Ticino, in the southern part of Switzerland. He received a Diploma in electrical engineering in 1988 from ETH Zurich. He then pursued a master's degree in electrical and computer engineering from the University of California, San Diego in 1991, before joining the University of California, Berkeley, where he graduated with a PhD in electrical engineering and computer sciences (EECS) with a thesis on analog and mixed-signal design automation in 1995. Until 2000, he stayed affiliated with the University of California, Berkeley, while working at the company Cadence Design Systems as the architect of intellectual property protection projects. In 2000, he joined Canesta Inc. as chief architect to lead the development of wireless 3D CMOS image sensors.

In 2002, Charbon joined the faculty of EPFL, where he has since 2015 been full professor of electrical engineering as well as the head of Laboratory of Advanced Quantum Architecture at EPFL's School of Engineering.

From 2008 to 2016, he was also professor at the Chair of VLSI design at Delft University of Technology. He is a distinguished visiting scholar of the W. M. Keck Institute for Space at California Institute of Technology (Caltech), and a fellow of the Kavli Institute of Nanoscience at Delft University of Technology.

== Research ==
Charbon's research is focused on the multi-disciplinary boundaries between physics and electrical engineering, and is invested both in ground research as well as the development of hardware and software systems. He investigates and develops cryogenic electronics, near and short wave infrared single photon avalanche devices (SPAD), light detecting and ranging (LIDAR) applications, microscopy, positron emission tomography (PET) components, quantum random number generators (QRNG), and super conducting devices.

Charbon lead and participated in a row of international and interdisciplinary research projects such as Megaframe (2006-2009), SPADNet (2010-2014), EndoTOFPET-US (2011-2015), Polis (2014-2018), MOS-QUITO (2016-2019), Qu3D (2019-2022), SuperMaMa (2020-2022).

He is the author or co-author of over 400 papers and two books, and he holds 23 patents.

His research has been featured in several news outlets such as Mirage News, Link Magazine, EE Times, New Scientist, Liechtensteiner Vaterland, and Les Nummeriques.

== Distinctions ==
He is the co-recipient of the best European paper award, IEEE International Solid-State Circuits Conference in 2021.

He is the recipient of the Venture Kick Awards in 2014 and 2020.

He is the recipient of the Europe's Best Academic Research Team Award in 2019 and the co-recipient of the best paper award, International Image Sensor Society (with Preethi Padmanabhan) in the same year.

He is the co-recipient of the best paper award, IEEE Nuclear Science Symposium (with Andrada Muntean in 2018 and with Francesco Gramuglia in 2020) and Physics and Applications of Superconducting Nanowire SPDs Conference (with Simone Frasca) in 2018.

He is the co-recipient of the best paper award, IEEE IWASI (with Fabio Sebastiano and Andrei Vladimirescu) in 2017.

He is a distinguished lecturer of the IEEE Photonics Society, a fellow of the IEEE (Institute of Electrical and Electronics Engineers), and a member of the Electron Devices Society (EDS), QuTech, and the Kavli Institute of Nanoscience Delft (KIND).

He is the founder of several start-up companies such as Fastree3D, Pi Imaging Technology, and NovoViz.

== Selected works ==
- Niclass, C.; Rochas, A.; Besse, P.-A.; Charbon, E. (2005). "Design and characterization of a CMOS 3-D image sensor based on single photon avalanche diodes" (PDF). IEEE Journal of Solid-State Circuits. 40 (9): 1847–1854. Bibcode:2005IJSSC..40.1847N. doi:10.1109/JSSC.2005.848173. S2CID 16981381.
- Niclass, Cristiano; Favi, Claudio; Kluter, Theo; Gersbach, Marek; Charbon, Edoardo (2008). "A 128 $\times$ 128 Single-Photon Image Sensor with Column-Level 10-Bit Time-to-Digital Converter Array". IEEE Journal of Solid-State Circuits. 43 (12): 2977–2989. Bibcode:2008IJSSC..43.2977N. doi:10.1109/JSSC.2008.2006445. S2CID 1490622.
- Niclass, Cristiano; Gersbach, Marek; Henderson, Robert; Grant, Lindsay; Charbon, Edoardo (2007). "A Single Photon Avalanche Diode Implemented in 130-nm CMOS Technology". IEEE Journal of Selected Topics in Quantum Electronics. 13 (4): 863–869. Bibcode:2007IJSTQ..13..863N. doi:10.1109/JSTQE.2007.903854. S2CID 15712334.
- Veerappan, Chockalingam; Richardson, Justin; Walker, Richard; Li, Day-Uey; Fishburn, Matthew W.; Maruyama, Yuki; Stoppa, David; Borghetti, Fausto; Gersbach, Marek; Henderson, Robert K.; Charbon, Edoardo (2011). "A 160×128 single-photon image sensor with on-pixel 55ps 10b time-to-digital converter". 2011 IEEE International Solid-State Circuits Conference. pp. 312–314. doi:10.1109/ISSCC.2011.5746333. ISBN 978-1-61284-303-2. S2CID 4648065.
- Bruschini, Claudio; Homulle, Harald; Antolovic, Ivan Michel; Burri, Samuel; Charbon, Edoardo (2019). "Single-photon avalanche diode imagers in biophotonics: Review and outlook". Light: Science & Applications. 8 (1): 87. arXiv:1903.07351. Bibcode:2019LSA.....8...87B. doi:10.1038/s41377-019-0191-5. PMC 6804596. PMID 31645931.
- Chang, Henry; Charbon, Edoardo; Choudhury, Umakanta; Felt, Eric; Demir, Alper; Liu, Edward; Malavasi, Enrico; Sangiovanni-Vincentelli, Alberto; Vassiliou, Iasson (1997). A Top-Down, Constraint-Driven Design Methodology for Analog Integrated Circuits. Springer. ISBN 0-7923-9794-0.
- Richardson, Justin; Walker, Richard; Grant, Lindsay; Stoppa, David; Borghetti, Fausto; Charbon, Edoardo; Gersbach, Marek; Henderson, Robert K. (2009). "A 32×32 50ps resolution 10 bit time to digital converter array in 130nm CMOS for time correlated imaging". 2009 IEEE Custom Integrated Circuits Conference. pp. 77–80. doi:10.1109/CICC.2009.5280890. ISBN 978-1-4244-4071-9. S2CID 2242302.
- Gersbach, Marek; Maruyama, Yuki; Trimananda, Rahmadi; Fishburn, Matt W.; Stoppa, David; Richardson, Justin A.; Walker, Richard; Henderson, Robert; Charbon, Edoardo (2012). "A Time-Resolved, Low-Noise Single-Photon Image Sensor Fabricated in Deep-Submicron CMOS Technology". IEEE Journal of Solid-State Circuits. 47 (6): 1394–1407. Bibcode:2012IJSSC..47.1394G. doi:10.1109/JSSC.2012.2188466. S2CID 1495522.

== Awards ==
- ERC Synergy with the Technical University of Munich, Germany and the University of Valencia, Spain.
