= Patrick Mantey =

Computer scientist

Patrick E. Mantey is a computer scientist and professor. He is known for his work on spatial decision support systems and data. In 2001, he was inducted as a fellow of the Institute of Electrical and Electronics Engineers.

== Selected publications ==
- "REINAS: the Real-time Environmental Information Network and Analysis System." Digest of Papers. COMPCON'95. Technologies for the Information Superhighway, 1995
- "Creating synergy between computer engineering and computer science programs." Technology-Based Re-Engineering Engineering Education Proceedings of Frontiers in Education FIE'96 26th Annual Conference, 1996
- "A pied piper: computer music to attract students to computer science/engineering." Technology-Based Re-Engineering Engineering Education Proceedings of Frontiers in Education FIE'96 26th Annual Conference, 1996
- "Use of ATM and other computer networks in delivery of engineering education-a perspective." Technology-Based Re-Engineering Engineering Education Proceedings of Frontiers in Education FIE'96 26th Annual Conference, 1996
- "Evaluation of an M.S. program using synchronous digital video course delivery to remote students, and its expansion, enhancement and improvements." 34th Annual Frontiers in Education, 2004
- "Floor control alternatives for distributed videoconferencing over IP networks." 2005 International Conference on Collaborative Computing: Networking, Applications and Worksharing, 2005
- "Large Classroom Experience with an Interactive Tiled Display Mural." Proceedings of 36th Annual Frontiers in Education, 2006
- "CARNIVORE: A Disruption-Tolerant System for Studying Wildlife." 2010 Proceedings of 19th International Conference on Computer Communications and Networks, 2010
- "Status and challenges of residential and industrial non-intrusive load monitoring." 2015 IEEE Conference on Technologies for Sustainability (SusTech), 2015
- "SEADS: A modifiable platform for real time monitoring of residential appliance energy consumption." 2015 Sixth International Green and Sustainable Computing Conference (IGSC), 2015
- "Cost-effective instrumentation via NILM to support a residential energy management system." 2016 IEEE International Conference on Consumer Electronics (ICCE), 2016
