= Milos Ercegovac =

University Professor

Miloš D. Ercegovac
- Born: 28 June 1942 (age 84); Belgrade, Serbia
- Education: University of Illinois Urbana-Champaign; University of Belgrade
- Known for: Approximate digital arithmetic, composite algorithms, complex arithmetic, design for low power arithmetic in application-specific architectures
- Scientific career
- Workplaces: University of California Los Angeles Henry Samueli School of Engineering

Dr. Miloš Ercegovac is a Serbian-born computer scientist and university professor whose research and teaching over 50 years spanned various areas of computer science, with emphasis on computer arithmetic, digital design, and computer system architecture.

Ercegovac is Distinguished Professor Emeritus and former Chair in the Computer Science Department of the Henry Samueli School of Engineering at the University of California Los Angeles (UCLA). He has been on the faculty there since 1975.

He became a Fellow of IEEE in 2003 for "contributions to the theory and practice of digital arithmetic." He has published his research results in peer-reviewed journals and conferences supported by professional societies such as IEEE and ACM. These publications are summarized in the Google Scholar listing of over 300 publications.

Ercegovac is an Emeritus Member of the Steering Committee of the IEEE Symposium on Computer Arithmetic and is Member of the Board of Directors of the Asilomar Conference on Signals, Systems and Computers. He received the Distinguished Academic Achievement Alumni Award from University of Illinois Urbana-Champain.

His work resulted in the books Digital Arithmetic released in 2003 by Morgan Kaufmann/Elsevier, and Division and Square Root: Digit-Recurrence Algorithms and Implementations released in 1994 by Kluwer Academic Publishers. The book Digital Arithmetic has over 1440 citations according to the Google Scholar entry.

Ercegovac's teaching experience led to the textbook Introduction to Digital Systems released in 1999 by John Wiley & Sons including companion material for teaching, which was translated to Portuguese, Chinese, and also released as an international edition in South Asia. Prof. Ercegovac also published a prior textbook Digital Systems and Hardware/Firmware Algorithms released in 1985.

Ercegovac pioneered online digital serial arithmetic, a technique where computations and communications are overlapped at the digit level, leading to high parallelism with reduced interconnections. He also made contributions to digital algorithms and implementations for division, square root and multiplication.

He received his M.S. and his Ph.D. in Computer Science from the University of Illinois Urbana-Champaign in 1972 and 1975, respectively, and a B.S. in Electrical Engineering from University of Belgrade, Serbia in 1965.
