= J. K. Aggarwal =

American engineer (born 1936)

J K Aggarwal
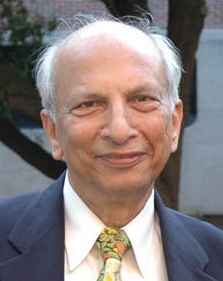
- Portrait of J K Aggarwal
- Awards: IAPR King-Sun Fu Prize (2004); Senior Research Award ASEE (1992); Okawa Prize Okawa Foundation (2007); Technical Achievement award IEEE Computer Society (1996); Graduate Teaching award University of Texas at Austin (1992); Kirchmayer Graduate Teaching Award IEEE (2005)

Academic background
- Education: University of Illinois, Urbana; University of Liverpool, Liverpool; University of Bombay, Bombay

Academic work
- Discipline: Computer Vision, Pattern Recognition, Image Processing
- Institutions: University of Texas at Austin

Jagdishkumar Keshoram Aggarwal (born 1936) is an American computer scientist, who is currently retired and is Cullen Trust Endowed Emeritus Professor of the Department of Electrical and Computer Engineering at the Cockrell School of Engineering, University of Texas at Austin. He is known for his contributions in the fields of computer vision, pattern recognition and image processing focusing on human motion and activities. He served in various positions in the Department of Electrical and Computer of the University of Texas at Austin and other institutions.

A Fellow of IEEE (1976), IAPR (1998) and AAAS (2005), he received the Senior Research Award of the American Society of Engineering Education in 1992, the 1996 Technical Achievement Award of the IEEE Computer Society, and the graduate teaching award at the University of Texas at Austin in 1992. More recently, he is the recipient of the 2004 King-Sun Fu Prize of the International Association for Pattern Recognition, the 2005 Kirchmayer Graduate Teaching Award of the IEEE, and the 2007 Okawa Prize of the Okawa Foundation of Japan. He is a Life Fellow of IEEE and a Golden Core member of IEEE Computer Society. He has authored and edited a number of books, chapters, proceedings of conferences, and papers. According to his Google Scholar profile, he has an h-index of 86.

== Biography ==
J. K. Aggarwal received his Bachelor of Science in 1957 from the University of Bombay, Bombay. He received a Bachelor of Engineering in 1960 from the University of Liverpool, Liverpool. He obtained his MS (1961) and PhD (1964) from the University of Illinois Urbana–Champaign under Nelson Wax. Since then, he has served in various positions as delineated below.

- Cullen Trust for Higher Education Endowed Professorship in Engineering, University of Texas at Austin, September 1990 – 2014.
- John J. McKetta Energy Professor of Electrical and Computer Engineering, College of Engineering, The University of Texas at Austin, September 1981–August 1990.
- Visiting Professor, Media Lab. MIT Spring 1995.
- Visiting Professor, Kobe University, Japan, Spring 1976.
- Professor of Electrical and Computer Engineering, The University of Texas at Austin, Austin, Texas, September 1972 – 2014.
- Associate Professor of Electrical Engineering, The University of Texas at Austin, Austin, Texas, September 1968 – 1972.
- Visiting Associate Professor of Electrical Engineering and Computer Science, University of California, Berkeley, California, September 1969–June 1970
- Visiting Assistant Professor, Center for Dynamical Systems, Brown University, Providence, R.I., February 1968–June 1968.
- Assistant Professor of Electrical Engineering, University of Texas at Austin, Austin, Texas, September 1964–August 1968.
- Research Assistant, Coordinated Science Laboratory, University of Illinois Urbana–Champaign, Illinois, June 1961–August 1964
- Fellow, University of Illinois Urbana–Champaign, Illinois, September 1960–May 1961
- Research Assistant, Marconi's Research Laboratory, Chelmsford, England, Summer 1959

== Selected publications ==
=== Books ===
- 2013, Computer Vision Analysis of Image Motion by Variational Methods. With Amar Mitiche. Springer Verlag.
- 2011, Combinatorial Image Analysis. Edited with Reneta P. Barneva, Valentin Brimkov, Kostadin N. Korotchev, and Elka R. Koroutcheva. Springer Verlag.
- 1993, Multisensor Fusion for Computer Vision (editor). Springer Verlag.
- 1988, Motion Understanding: Robot and Human Vision. Edited with W.N. Martin. Kluwer Academic Publishers.
- 1982, Deconvolution of Seismic Data. Edited with V. K. Arya. Hutchinson, Ross Publishing Company.
- 1979, Digital Signal Processing (editor). Western Periodicals Company, North Hollywood, California.
- 1977, Computer Methods in Image Analysis. Edited with R. O. Duda and A. Rosenfeld. IEEE Press.
- 1977, Nonlinear Systems: Stability Analysis. Edited with M. Vidyasagar. Dowden, Hutchinson, Ross.
- 1972, Notes on Nonlinear Systems, Van Nostrand Reinhold.

=== Research articles ===
- Davis, L.S., Johns, S.A. and Aggarwal, J.K., 1979. Texture analysis using generalized co-occurrence matrices. IEEE Transactions on Pattern Analysis and Machine Intelligence, (3), pp. 251–259.
- Roach, J.W. and Aggarwal, J.K., 1980. Determining the movement of objects from a sequence of images. IEEE Transactions on Pattern Analysis and Machine Intelligence, (6), pp. 554–562.
- Martin, W.N. and Aggarwal, J.K., 1983. Volumetric descriptions of objects from multiple views. IEEE Transactions on Pattern Analysis and Machine Intelligence, (2), pp. 150–158.
- Cai, Q. and Aggarwal, J.K., 1999. Tracking human motion in structured environments using a distributed-camera system. IEEE Transactions on Pattern Analysis and Machine Intelligence, 21(11), pp. 1241–1247.
- Ryoo, M.S. and Aggarwal, J.K., 2009, September. Spatio-temporal relationship match: Video structure comparison for recognition of complex human activities. In IEEE International Conference on Computer Vision (ICCV).
- Xia, L. and Aggarwal, J.K., 2013. Spatio-temporal depth cuboid similarity feature for activity recognition using depth camera. In IEEE Conference on Computer Vision and Pattern Recognition (CVPR).

=== Survey articles ===
- Aggarwal, J.K. and Nandhakumar, N., 1988. On the computation of motion from sequences of images-a review. Proceedings of the IEEE, 76(8), pp. 917–935.
- Dhond, U.R. and Aggarwal, J.K., 1989. Structure from stereo-a review. IEEE Transactions on Systems, Man, and Cybernetics, 19(6), pp. 1489–1510.
- Aggarwal, J.K. and Cai, Q., 1999. Human motion analysis: A review. Computer Vision and Image Understanding, 73(3), pp. 428–440.
- Aggarwal, J.K. and Ryoo, M.S., 2011. Human activity analysis: A review. ACM Computing Surveys (CSUR), 43(3), pp. 1–43.
- Aggarwal, J.K. and Xia, L., 2014. Human activity recognition from 3d data: A review. Pattern Recognition Letters, 48, pp. 70–80.

== Recognitions ==
J. K. Aggarwal's extensive scientific contributions have led to several awards being established in his honor. Chief among these is the biennial IAPR J. K. Aggarwal Prize, presented by the International Association for Pattern Recognition (IAPR). Awarded first in 2006, this prestigious award recognizes a young scientist, under the age of 40, who has made significant and impactful contributions to a field relevant to the IAPR community. Early recipients of the award include Song-Chun Zhu, Antonio Torralba, and Rene Vidal. More recent recipients include Fei Fei Li, Kristen Grauman, and Abhinav Gupta. Recipients of this prize are selected based on nominations and endorsements from IAPR member societies. The award includes the opportunity to present an invited talk at the International Conference on Pattern Recognition (ICPR) and to contribute to a special issue of Pattern Recognition Letters.

Other awards include the J.K. Aggarwal Endowed Undergraduate Presidential Scholarship in Electrical & Computer Engineering awarded by the Cockrell School of Engineering, University of Texas at Austin. The J.K. Aggarwal Endowed Presidential Scholarship was established through an anonymous donor in his honor by an initial contribution of $50,000 and later augmented by additional contributions, now with a total exceeding $250,000, so that as many as five scholarships are given each year.

Another notable recognition in J. K. Aggarwal's honor is the Aggarwal Endowed Presidential Scholarship in Indian Studies for Undergraduates, administered by the South Asia Institute at the University of Texas. Established in 2010 by the Board of Regents of The University of Texas System, this scholarship benefits the College of Liberal Arts and was made possible through the generous contributions of J.K. Aggarwal and Shanti J. Aggarwal. The scholarship awards up to $3,000 to outstanding juniors and seniors at the University of Texas, further extending Dr. Aggarwal's legacy of supporting academic excellence and fostering a deeper understanding of Indian studies.

The J.K. Aggarwal Huddle Room in the Engineering Education and Research Center (EERC) at the University of Texas at Austin serves as yet another tribute to Professor J. K. Aggarwal’s profound influence on the field of computer vision and his dedication to education over a fifty-year career. This space was established through a fundraising initiative led by Dr. Aggarwal's former students, who sought to honor his legacy by creating a place that reflects his commitment to mentorship and research. Contributions from alumni and friends helped raise over $125,000, creating the J.K. Aggarwal Endowed Excellence Fund for graduate students, intended to support future generations in electrical and computer engineering. The room is designed as a collaborative space, encouraging interdisciplinary learning and innovation in engineering, embodying the principles that Dr. Aggarwal championed. This named room not only memorializes his achievements but also serves as an inspiration for students and faculty to continue advancing in fields related to Dr. Aggarwal's pioneering research.

The J.K. Aggarwal Huddle Room

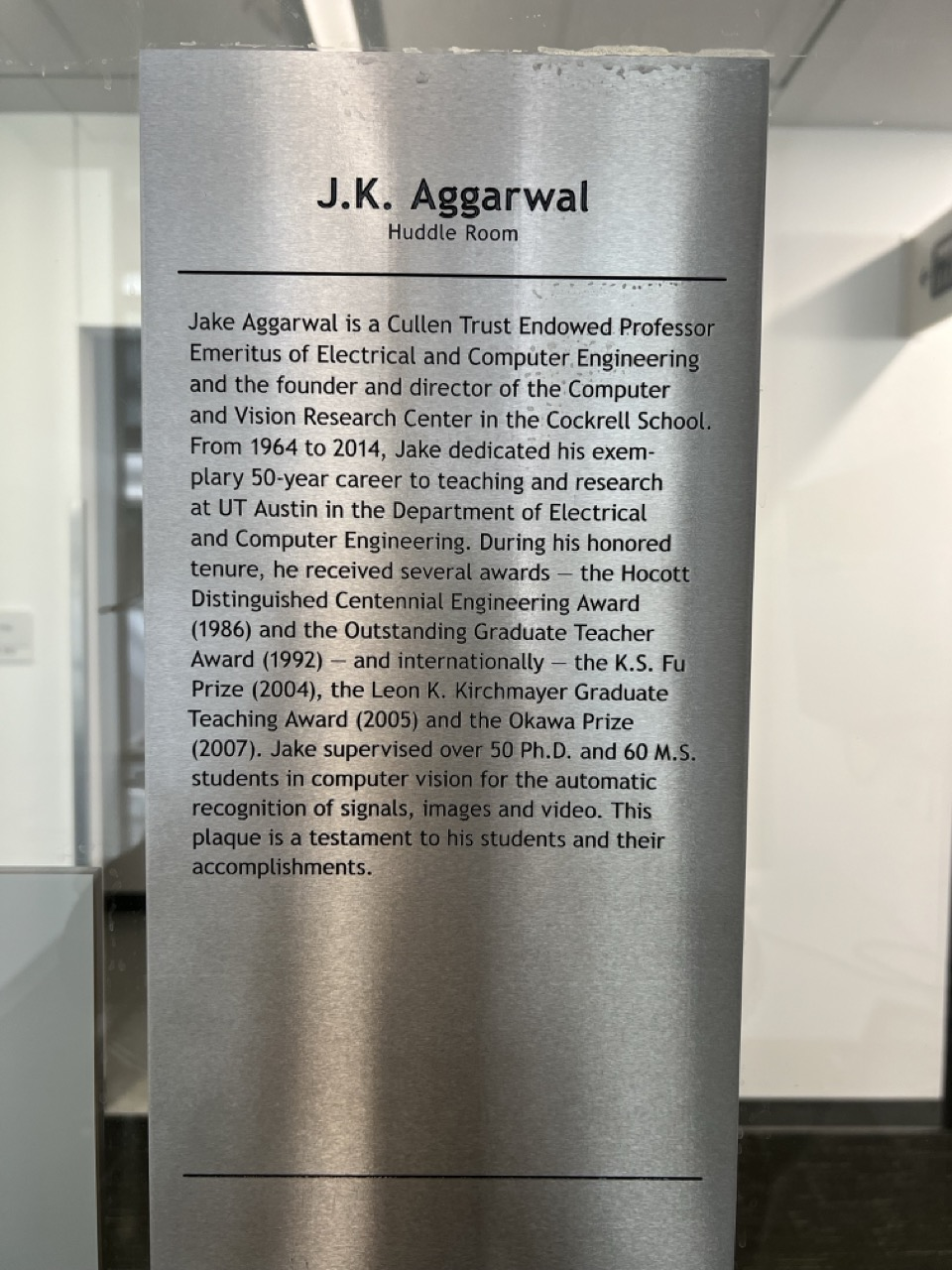

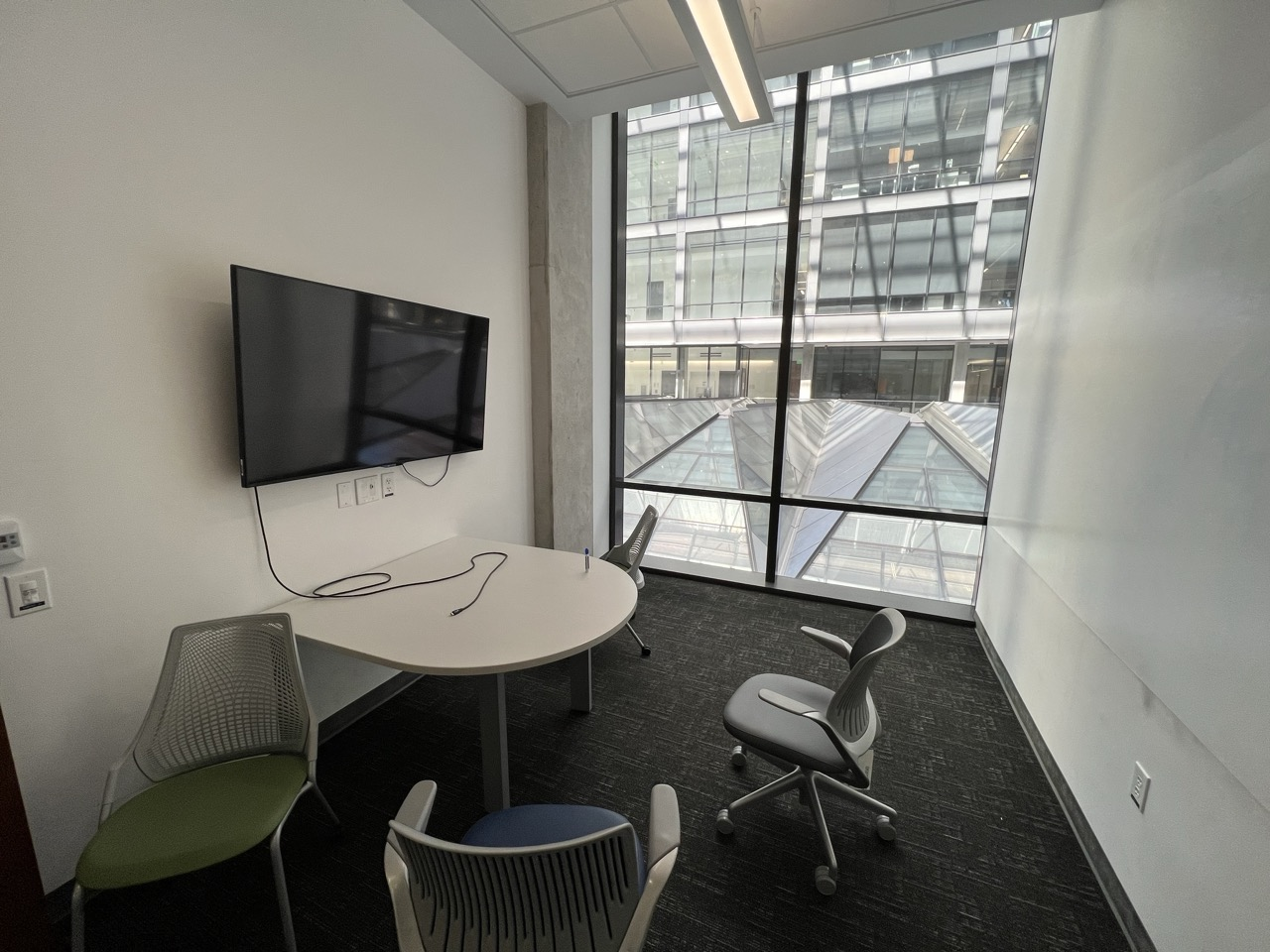
