= Paolo Montuschi =

Paolo Montuschi is a professor at the Polytechnic University of Turin, Italy. He was awarded Fellow of the Institute of Electrical and Electronics Engineers (IEEE) in 2014 for his contributions to the theory and applications of digital arithmetic.
