= Alan Gatherer =

American electrical engineer

Alan Gatherer is an electrical engineer with Huawei Corporation in Plano, Texas. He was named a Fellow of the Institute of Electrical and Electronics Engineers (IEEE) in 2016 for his contributions to systems-on-chip for 3G and 4G cellular systems.
