= Hyesoon Kim =

Korean-American computer engineer

Hyesoon Kim is a South Korean-American computer engineer and professor specializing in computer architecture, especially involving graphics processing units and their incorporation into heterogeneous computing systems. She is a professor in the Georgia Tech School of Computer Science, where she heads the High Performance Architecture Lab.

== Education and career ==
Kim was born in Daejeon. She was a student at the Daejeon Science High School for the Gifted, and then became an undergraduate student at KAIST in Daejon, graduating with a bachelor's degree in mechanical engineering. She continued for a master's degree in mechanical engineering at Seoul National University, and then worked in industry for two years at the Hyundai Motor Company, performing research on car engines.

Next, she went to the University of Texas at Austin for graduate study in electrical engineering, earning a master's degree and completing her Ph.D. in 2007. Her doctoral dissertation, Adaptive predication via compiler-microarchitecture cooperation, was supervised by Yale Patt.

She joined the Georgia Tech faculty as an assistant professor in 2007, and gained tenure there as an associate professor in 2013. She also holds an affiliation as adjunct professor in the School of Electrical and Computer Engineering.

== Recognition ==
Kim was named an IEEE Fellow, in the 2024 class of fellows, "for contributions to resource modeling and partitioning in heterogeneous computing systems".
