= Hong Jiang =

Hong Jiang from the Intel Corporation, Santa Clara, CA was named Fellow of the Institute of Electrical and Electronics Engineers (IEEE) in 2015 for leadership in parallel multimedia computing architectures and systems.
