= Phillip Gibbons =

Phillip Gibbons, formerly of Intel Labs Pittsburgh, is a professor in the Computer Science Department and the Electrical & Computer Engineering Department at Carnegie Mellon University.

Gibbons was named a Fellow of the Institute of Electrical and Electronics Engineers (IEEE) in 2014 for his contributions to parallel computing and databases.
