= Yuanchun Shi =

Chinese computer scientist

Yuanchun Shi (Chinese: 史元春) is a Chinese computer scientist whose research is in human–computer interaction, including collaboration between people and computer systems, remote education, emotion recognition, gesture recognition, and extended reality. She is a Changjiang Distinguished Professor in the Department of Computer Science and Technology at Tsinghua University, and president of Qinghai University.

Shi was educated at Tsinghua University. She became an assistant professor there in 1993, and was promoted to associate professor and full professor in 1997 and 2002. She directed the Institute of Human Computer Interaction and Media Integration from 2003 to 2018, and has directed the Key Lab of Pervasive Computing since 2006. From 2015 to 2020 she was dean of the Institute of Global Innovation Exchange. She directed the computer science department at Qinghai University from 2013 until 2016 before becoming its president in 2022.

Shi was named to the 2026 class of IEEE Fellows, "for contributions to research in natural human-computer interaction, and interdisciplinary IT-driven innovation".
