= Kwok Cheung =

American electrical engineer

Kwok Cheung is an electrical engineer working at Alstom Grid in Redmond, Washington.

Cheung was named a Fellow of the Institute of Electrical and Electronics Engineers (IEEE) in 2014 for his work in the development and implementation of energy and market management systems for control centers.
