= Sujit Dey =

Sujit Dey is a professor in the Department of Electrical and Computer Engineering, the Director of the Center for Wireless Communications, and the Director of the Institute for the Global Entrepreneur at the University of California, San Diego. He was named Fellow of the Institute of Electrical and Electronics Engineers (IEEE) in 2014 for contributions to the design and testing of low-power systems and system-on-chips.

Dey obtained his Ph.D. in computer science from Duke University in 1991. He then served as a senior research staff member for NEC C&C Research Laboratories in Princeton, New Jersey. Dey joined University of California, San Diego in 1997 and in 2004 founded Ortiva Wireless. He served as the company's CEO, CTO and Chief Technologist until its acquisition by Allot in 2012. After acquisition by Allot Communications, he served as that company's chief scientist of its Mobile Networks department. From 2013 to 2015 Dey served as Faculty Director of the von Liebig Entrepreneurism Center and in 2017 was appointed as an adjunct professor at Rady School of Management and the Jacobs Family Chair in Engineering Management Leadership.
