= Weihua Jiang =

Engineer

Weihua Jiang from the Nagaoka University of Technology, Nagaoka, Japan was named Fellow of the Institute of Electrical and Electronics Engineers (IEEE) in 2014 for contributions to repetitive pulsed power generation utilizing solid-state device technology.
