= Toru Shimizu =

Japanese electric engineer

Toru Shimizu from the Renesas Electronics Corp., Tokyo, Japan, was named Fellow of the Institute of Electrical and Electronics Engineers (IEEE) in 2014 for the development of integrated multi-core microprocessors with large memories.
