= Cristina Silvano =

Italian computer scientist

Cristina Silvano is an Italian computer engineer whose research interests include computer architecture, reconfigurable computing, and efficient energy use in computing. She is a professor in the Department of Computer Engineering at the Polytechnic University of Milan.

== Education and career ==
Silvano earned a laurea in electronics engineering (equivalent to a master's degree) from the Polytechnic University of Milan in 1987. From 1987 to 1996 she worked in industry for Groupe Bull, VLSI Technology, and IBM, including participation in the design of the IBM PowerPC microprocessor. She completed a Ph.D. in information engineering in 1999 at the University of Brescia.

After postdoctoral research at the Polytechnic University of Milan, she became an assistant professor of computer science at the University of Milan in 2000. In 2002 she returned to the Polytechnic University of Milan as an associate professor of computer engineering, and in 2018 she was named full professor. Since 2020 she has chaired the university's Research Area on Computer Science and Engineering.

== Recognition ==
Silvano was named as an IEEE Fellow in 2017 "for contributions to energy-efficient computer architectures".
