= Marc Pollefeys =

Belgian computer scientist

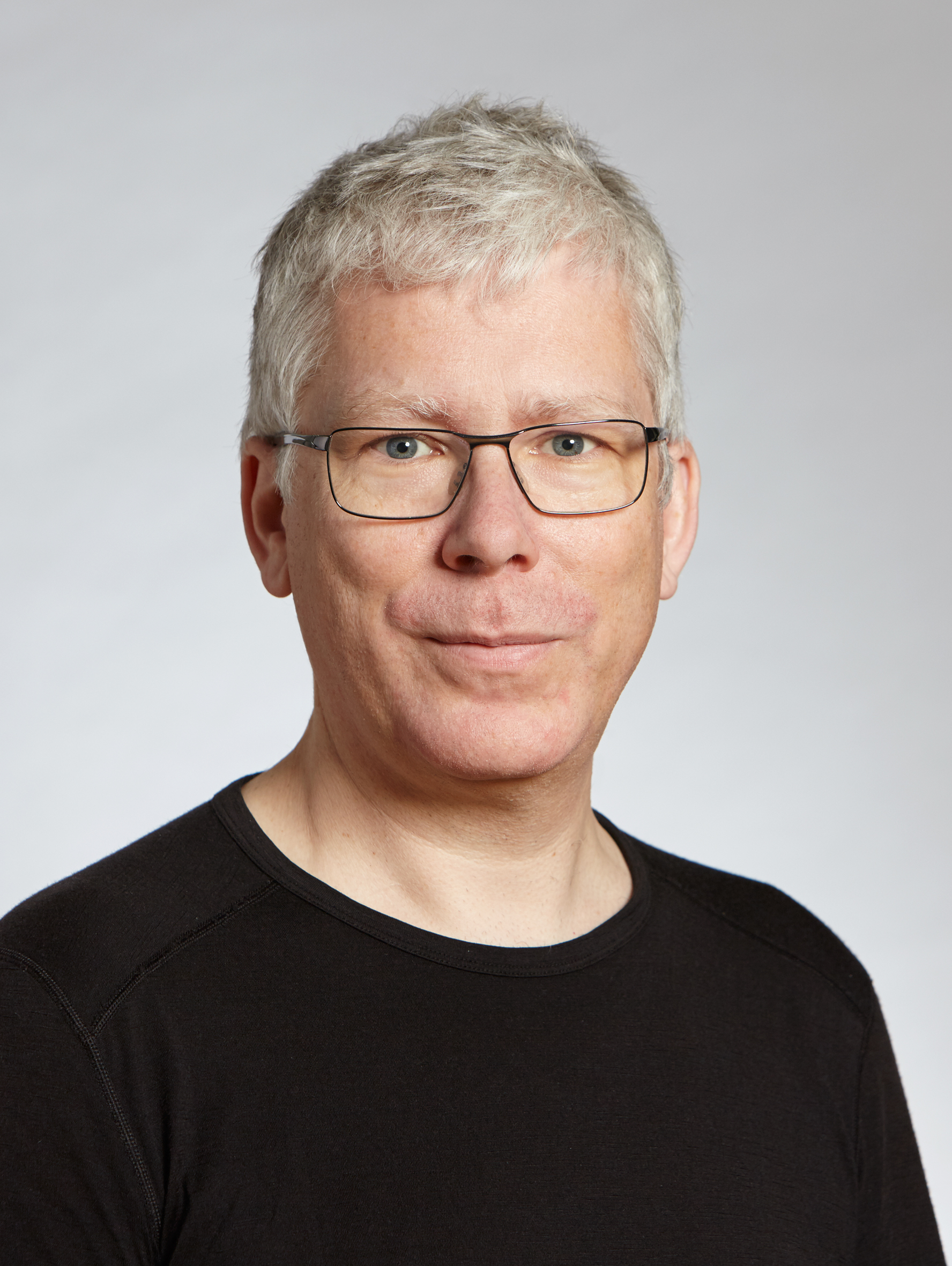

Marc André Léon Pollefeys (born 1 May 1971) is a Belgian computer scientist and professor for computer science at ETH Zurich, Switzerland, as well as partner director of science at Microsoft. He is director of Microsoft's Mixed Reality & AI Lab – Zurich.

Pollefeys was born in Anderlecht, Belgium. He was named Fellow of the Institute of Electrical and Electronics Engineers (IEEE) in 2012 for contributions to three-dimensional computer vision. He was named to the 2022 class of ACM Fellows, "for contributions to geometric computer vision and applications to AR/VR/MR, robotics, and autonomous vehicles".
