= Yoshihiro Shiroishi =

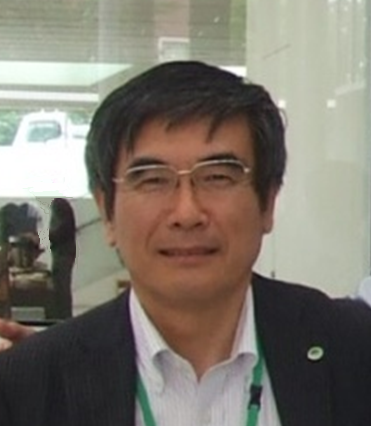
- Yoshihiro Shiroishi, 2013, Tokyo
- Born: March 10, 1951; Tokyo, Japan
- Occupations: Materials Scientist, Engineer, Inventor
- Employer: Hitachi
- Awards: RCA David Sarnoff Scholar (Japan), 1973; Japan Minister's Award, 2005; Fellow of the IEEE, 2015; Fellow of EAJ, 2017

Yoshihiro Shiroishi was born in 1951 in Tokyo, Japan. He is a Chief Architect and Technical Advisor at the Hitachi Research & Dev. Group, Tokyo, Japan. Shiroishi was named Fellow of the Institute of Electrical and Electronics Engineers (IEEE) in 2015 for leadership in the development of high density magnetic recording technologies and devices.

== Background and Education ==
Shiroishi was born in 1951 in Tokyo, Japan. He attended Tokyo Institute of Technology and was awarded a BS degree in 1973, an MS degree in 1975 and a Ph.D. in 1978. The latter was for his widely cited work on ferroelectric materials.

== Career ==
In 1978, Shiroishi joined the Hitachi Central Research Lab. to work on magnetic recording and was a joint researcher on magnetic super-lattice at Northwestern University from 1985 to 1986. From 1995 to 2003, he was with the Data Storage and Retrieval Division of Hitachi. becoming General Manager of the Data Storage Division. In particular, he contributed to the development of magnetic recording media for hard disk drives. From 2003 to 2009, Shiroishi was with Hitachi GST (formed when Hitachi purchased IBM's disk-drive business). He was successively Deputy General Manager Heads and Media, Vice President External Heads and Media, and Vice President R&D Strategy Office.
Shiroishi contributed to the magnetic storage industry and to academic research on magnetic recording. He led the NEDO's (New Energy and Industrial Technology Development) "Ultra-advanced Electronic Technology Development Promotion Project" from 1995 to 2000 and its “Development of Nanobit Technology for Ultra-high Density Magnetic Recording (Green IT Project) project” from 2008 to 2013. His technical focus included Microwave Assisted Magnetic Recording (MAMR) (In 2017, MAMR-based HDDs were announced by Western Digital which had purchased Hitachi GST)).
Shiroishi was the chairperson of the technical committee for Storage Research Consortium (SRC) from 2007 to 2012. Shiroishi also contributed to academia as the vice chairperson, Magnetic Society of Japan (MSJ) from 2009 to 2011, Conference Co-chairman for IEEE 24th Magnetic Recording Conference in 2013, TMRC 2013, and Experts Committee member of the Quantum Science and Technology Council, the Japan Ministry of Education, Culture, Sports, Science and Technology (MEXT), from 2015.
Since 2009, Shiroishi has been with Hitachi Research & Development Group where (as of July 2020) he holds the position of Chief Architect and Technical Advisor. His recent work emphasises government/industry/university collaboration and the societal impact of technology.
Shiroishi also holds positions of visiting professor at Tokyo Institute of Technology, Osaka Electro-Communication University, and Toho University.

== Awards and recognition ==
In 1973 Shiroishi received the RCA David Sarnoff Scholar award (Japan). In 1992, he received the Governor of Kanagawa Prefecture Local Commendation for Invention, Kanto, Japan Institute of Invention and Innovation for Magnetic Recording Head design and, in 2006, the Local Commendation for Invention, Kanto, Japan Institute of Invention and Innovation for Magnetic Recording Media design (PP3343215), and, in 2007, the Japan MEXT Minister Award, Local Commendation for Invention, Kanto, Japan Institute of Invention and Innovation for a Magnetic Recording Device (PP3799168). In 2005, Shiroishi received the Japan Minister of Economy, Trade and Industry Award for Research and development and practical application of ultra-high density magnetic recording technology. In 2015, Shiroishi was named Fellow of the Institute of Electrical and Electronics Engineers (IEEE) for leadership in the development of high density magnetic recording technologies and devices. In 2017, he became a Fellow of the Engineering Academy of Japan (EAJ)
Shiroishi has been a prolific inventor and an author of many scientific papers

== Personal ==
Yoshihiro Shiroishi was born on March 10, 1951, in Tokyo, Japan, the son of Yoshiji and Teruko (née Kobayashi). He married Yasuko Ohshiro on 3 Oct. 1981. They have three children Takuya, Kenji, Ayako. They reside in Hachioji, Japan. Shiroishi was Director Town Assembly Higashiasakawamachi, Tokyo, 1993-1994 and has been chosen as its vice-chairman in 2020.
