= Qi Tian =

Qi Tian from the University of Texas at San Antonio was named Fellow of the Institute of Electrical and Electronics Engineers (IEEE) in 2016 for contributions to multimedia information retrieval. He was named as an ACM Fellow, in the 2024 class of fellows, "for contributions to multimedia information retrieval, computer vision, and AI for scientific computing".
