= Xiaoqing Wen =

Fellow of the Institute of Electrical and Electronics Engineers in 2012

Xiaoqing Wen from the Kyushu Institute of Technology, Iizuka, Fukuoka, Japan was named Fellow of the Institute of Electrical and Electronics Engineers (IEEE) in 2012 for contributions to testing of integrated circuits.
