= ARITH Symposium on Computer Arithmetic =

Computer science conference

The IEEE International Symposium on Computer Arithmetic (ARITH) is a conference in the area of computer arithmetic. The symposium was established in 1969, initially as three-year event, then as a biennial event, and, finally, from 2015 as an annual symposium.

ARITH topics span from theoretical aspects and algorithms for operations, to hardware implementations of arithmetic units and applications of computer arithmetic.

ARITH symposia are sponsored by IEEE Computer Society. They have been described as one of "the most prestigious forums for computer arithmetic" by researchers at the National Institute of Standards and Technology, as the main conference forum for new research publications in computer arithmetic by Parhami (2003), and as a forum for interacting with the "international community of arithmeticians" by participants Peter Kornerup and David W. Matula.

== List of ARITH symposia ==
| Edition | Date | Location | Website |
|---|---|---|---|
| 33rd | 2026-06-28 to 2026-07-01 | Fulda, Germany | ARITH 2026 |
| 32nd | 2025-05-04/07 | El Paso, Texas, USA | ARITH 2025 |
| 31st | 2024-06-10/12 | Málaga, Spain | ARITH 2024 |
| 30th | 2023-09-04/06 | Portland, Oregon, USA | ARITH 2023 |
| 29th | 2022-09-12/14 | Virtual conference (due to the COVID-19 pandemic) | ARITH 2022 |
| 28th | 2021-06-14/16 | Virtual conference (due to the COVID-19 pandemic) | ARITH 2021 |
| 27th | 2020-06-07/10 | Portland, Oregon, USA, canceled due to COVID-19 | |
| 26th | 2019-06-10/12 | Kyoto, Japan | ARITH 26 |
| 25th | 2018-06-25/27 | Amherst, Massachusetts, USA | ARITH 25 |
| 24th | 2017-07-24/26 | London, UK | ARITH 24 |
| 23rd | 2016-07-10/13 | Santa Clara, California, USA | ARITH 23 |
| 22nd | 2015-06-22/24 | Lyon, France | ARITH 22 |
| 21st | 2013-04-07/10 | Austin, Texas, USA | ARITH 21 |
| 20th | 2011-07-25/27 | Tübingen, Germany | ARITH 20 |
| 19th | 2009-06-08/10 | Portland, Oregon, USA | ARITH 19 |
| 18th | 2007-06-25/27 | Montpellier, France | ARITH 18 |
| 17th | 2005-06-27/29 | Cape Cod, Massachusetts, USA | |
| 16th | 2003-06-15/18 | Santiago de Compostela, Spain | |
| 15th | 2001-06-11/13 | Vail, Colorado, USA | |
| 14th | 1999-04-14/16 | Adelaide, Australia | ARITH 14 |
| 13th | 1997-07-06/09 | Asilomar, Pacific Grove, California, USA | |
| 12th | 1995-07-19/21 | Bath, UK | |
| 11th | 1993-06-29 to 1993-07-02 | Windsor, Ontario, Canada | |
| 10th | 1991-06-26/28 | Grenoble, France | |
| 9th | 1989-09-06/08 | Santa Monica, California, USA | |
| 8th | 1987-05-19/21 | Como, Italy | |
| 7th | 1985-06-04/06 | Urbana, Illinois, USA | |
| 6th | 1983-06-20/22 | Aarhus, Denmark | |
| 5th | 1981-05-18/19 | Ann Arbor, Michigan, USA | |
| 4th | 1978-10-25/26 | Santa Monica, California, USA | |
| 3rd | 1975-11-19/20 | Dallas, Texas, USA | |
| 2nd | 1972-05-15/16 | College Park, Maryland, USA | |
| 1st | 1969-06-16 | Minneapolis, Minnesota, USA | |
