= List of fellows of IEEE Aerospace and Electronic Systems Society =

The Fellow grade of membership is the highest level of membership, and cannot be applied for directly by the member – instead the candidate must be nominated by others. This grade of membership is conferred by the IEEE Board of Directors in recognition of a high level of demonstrated extraordinary accomplishment.

| Year | Fellow | Citation |
|---|---|---|
| 1984 | Yaakov Bar-Shalom | For contributions to the theory of stochastic systems and of multitarget tracking |
| 1991 | Edward K. Reedy | For technical leadership and contributions to developing and exploiting the millimeter wavelengths in radar applications |
| 1993 | Raj Jain | For contributions to performance analysis and modeling of computer systems and networks and for providing a new direction for solutions to the problem of network congestion |
| 1994 | David Lynch | For leadership in the development of programmable signal processors and low probability of intercept radar |
| 1997 | Donald H. Sinnott | For contributions to the development of computational electromagnetics and technological leadership of defense research and development in Australia |
| 1997 | Pramod Varshney | For contributions to the theory and applications of distributed detection and data fusion |
| 1999 | Marvin L. Cohen | For contributions to pulse compression and target recognition theory and practice |
| 1999 | Prasad Gogineni | For development of innovative research radars and radar studies of polar sea and glacial ice |
| 2000 | Alfonso Farina | For development and application of adaptive signal processing methods for radar systems |
| 2001 | Belur V. Dasarathy | For contributions to pattern recognition, sensor fusion, automated intelligent decision system design and image processing |
| 2001 | Bozenna Pasik-Duncan | For contributions to identification and stochastic adaptive control. |
| 2004 | Moe Z. Win | For contributions to wideband wireless transmission |
| 2005 | Jian Li | For contributions to adaptive beam forming, radar imaging, and target detection |
| 2007 | Teresa Pace | For contributions to image and signal processing algorithms for sensor systems |
| 2008 | Athina Petropulu | For contributions to signal processing for communications, networking and ultrasound imaging |
| 2008 | Weihua Zhuang | For contributions to mobile communications and networks |
| 2009 | Mahta Moghaddam | For contributions to forward and inverse scattering techniques for radar remote sensing |
| 2010 | Jennifer Bernhard | For development of multifunctional, reconfigurable, and integrated antennas |
| 2011 | Véronique Ferlet-Cavrois | For contributions to understanding of radiation effects on electronic devices |
| 2011 | Maria Greco | For contributions to non-Gaussian radar clutter modeling and signal processing algorithms |
| 2012 | Bernard Mulgrew | For contributions to linear and nonlinear equalizers for adaptive systems |
| 2012 | Roy Streit | For contributions to multi-target tracking, classification, and sonar signal processing |
| 2013 | Marshall Greenspan | For contributions to design and development multi-channel radars |
| 2013 | Mihai Datcu | For contributions to information mining of high resolution synthetic aperature radar and optical earth observation images |
| 2013 | Antonio De Maio | For contributions to radar signal processing |
| 2013 | Yonina Eldar | For contributions to compressed sampling, generalized sampling, and convex optimization |
| 2013 | Erwin Carl Gangl | For development of digital avionics intra-communication systems and Mil-Std-1553 |
| 2013 | Gerhard Johannes Krieger | For contributions to advanced synthetic aperture radar systems |
| 2014 | Yu Morton | For contributions to the understanding of ionospherice effects on global navigation satellite signals |
| 2014 | Marina Ruggieri | For contributions to millimeter-wave satellite communications |
| 2014 | Iram Weinstein | For leadership in signal processing and test methods for radars detecting advanced aircraft and cruise missiles in severe terrain clutter |
| 2014 | Hassan Kojori | For contributions to the design and application of predictive and diagnostic algorithms in power electronics converters |
| 2014 | Peter Sandborn | For contributions to the analysis of cost and life-cycle of electronic systems |
| 2014 | Toshio Iguchi | For contributions to spaceborne meteorological instruments and radar |
| 2015 | Kristine Bell | For contributions to statistical signal processing with radar and sonar applications |
| 2015 | Gérard Lachapelle | For contributions to signal processing for global navigation satellite systems |
| 2015 | Wu Ji | For leadership in satellite remote sensing programs |
| 2015 | Nuno Borges De Carvalho | For contributions on characterization and design of nonlinear RF circuits |
| 2016 | William Baldygo | For leadership in signal processing for radar systems |
| 2016 | Shannon Blunt | For contributions to radar waveform diversity and design |
| 2016 | Giuseppe Fabrizio | For contributions to adaptive array signal processing in over-the-horizon radar systems |
| 2016 | Thor I. Fossen | For contributions to modelling and controlling of marine crafts |
| 2016 | Lance Kaplan | For contributions to signal processing and information fusion for situational awareness |
| 2016 | Daniele Mortari | For contributions to navigational aspects of space systems |
| 2021 | Birsen Yazıcı | For contributions to synthetic aperture radar and passive imaging |
| 2022 | Maruthi Akella | For contributions to spacecraft control systems |
| 2022 | Frank van Diggelen | For contributions to assisted global navigation satellite systems for consumer applications |
| 2023 | Michael Braasch | For contributions to GPS multipath error characterization and mitigation |
| 2023 | Khanh D. Pham | For leadership in military aerospace decision support systems and strategic small business innovation |

== See also ==
- List of IEEE Fellows
