= Pramod Varshney =

Indian-American electrical engineer

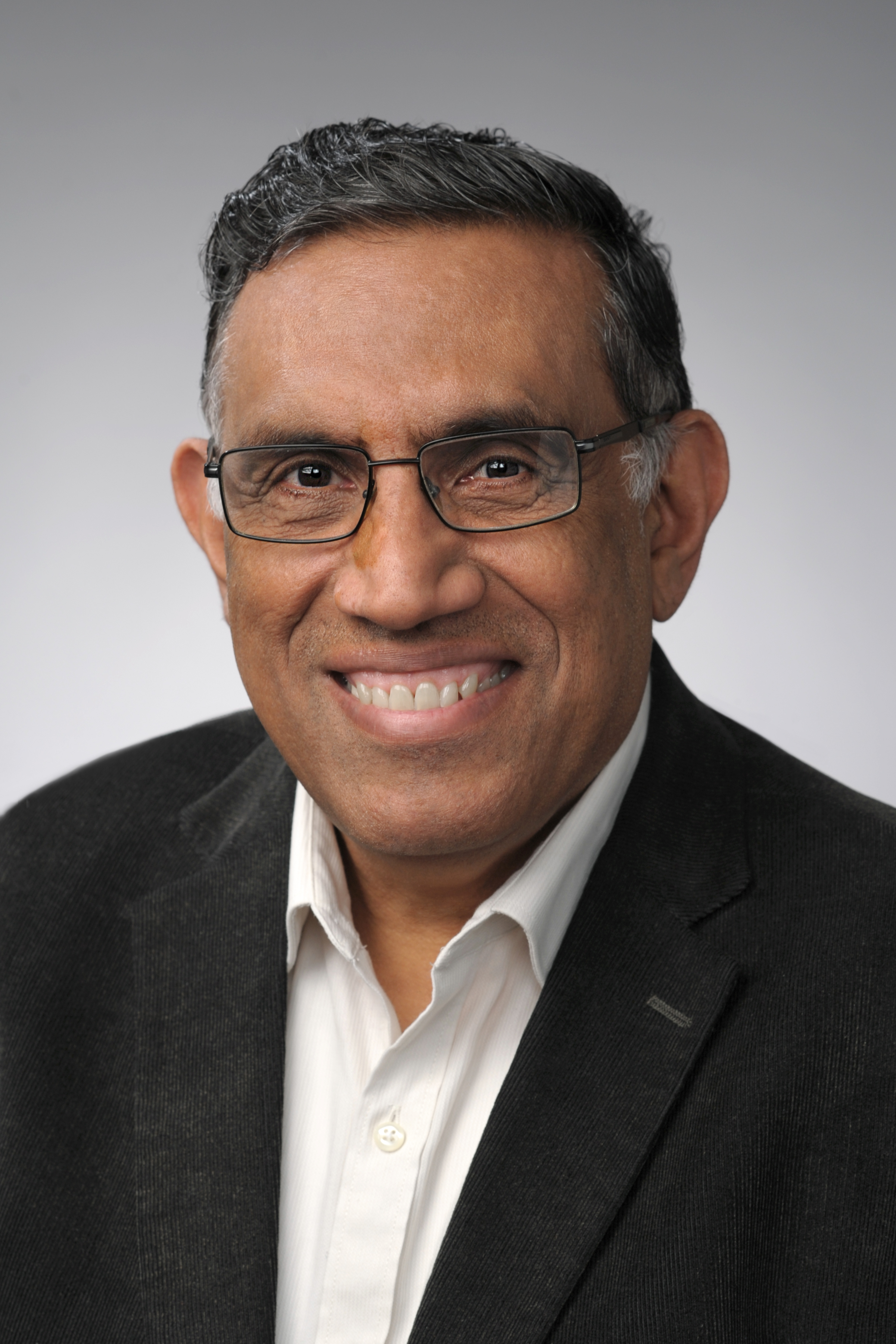
- Pramod Varshney
- Education: University of Illinois at Urbana–Champaign
- Spouse: Anju Varshney
- Children: Lav Varshney, Kush Varshney
- Awards: Yaakov Bar-Shalom Award; IEEE Judith A. Resnik Award
- Scientific career
- Fields: Information Fusion
- Workplaces: Syracuse University
- Doctoral advisor: Abraham H. Haddad

Pramod Kumar Varshney is a computer scientist and an electrical engineer at Syracuse University's College of Engineering and Computer Science. He earned a PhD from the University of Illinois at Urbana–Champaign in electrical engineering in 1976 under Abraham H. Haddad. He is known for research on distributed detection theory and sensor fusion. He also worked on research related to Byzantines in sensor networks, estimation theory, wireless communications, image processing, radar signal processing, physical layer security, and machine learning. He supervised 68 PhD students, authored over 560 conference papers and over 350 journal papers.

Varshney was named a Fellow of the Institute of Electrical and Electronics Engineers (IEEE) in 1997 for contributions to the theory and applications of distributed detection and data fusion. He was honored with the 2021 IEEE Aerospace and Electronic Systems Society (AESS) Pioneer Award. Varshney was awarded the IEEE Judith A. Resnik Award in 2012. He was given the Yaakov Bar-Shalom Award for a Lifetime of Excellence by the International Society of Information Fusion in 2018. In 2022 he received the Claude Shannon-Harry Nyquist Technical Achievement Award by the IEEE Signal Processing Society. In 2000 he was awarded the Chancellor’s Citation for exceptional academic achievement from Syracuse University. In 2014 he was awarded an honorary doctorate degree from Drexel University. Varshney served as the Associate Chair of the electrical engineering department at Syracuse University from 1993-1996. From 2009-2023 he was the executive director of the Center for Advanced Systems and Engineering (CASE) at Syracuse university.

== Books ==
- Distributed Detection and Data Fusion, 1997, Springer-Verlag, New York, NY. doi:10.1007/978-1-4612-1904-0
- Advanced Image Processing Techniques for Remotely Sensed Hyperspectral Data, 2004, Springer Science & Business Media, New York, NY. doi:10.1007/978-3-662-05605-9
- Multisensor surveillance systems: the fusion perspective, 2003, Springer Science & Business Media, New York, NY. doi:10.1007/978-1-4615-0371-2
- Secure Networked Inference with Unreliable Data Sources, 2018, Springer Singapore, Singapore. doi:10.1007/978-981-13-2312-6
- Modern Approaches in Applied Intelligence: Part I, 2011, Springer Berlin, Heidelberg. doi:10.1007/978-3-642-21822-4
- Modern Approaches in Applied Intelligence: Part II, 2011, Springer Berlin, Heidelberg. doi:10.1007/978-3-642-21827-9
- Developing Concepts in Applied Intelligence, 2011, Springer Berlin, Heidelberg. doi:10.1007/978-3-642-21332-8
