= PDAF =

PDAF may refer to:

- Probabilistic data association filter, a statistical approach to the problem of plot association in a radar tracker
- Priority Development Assistance Fund, a discretionary fund in the Philippines
- Phase-detection autofocus, a type of autofocus used in some cameras
