= Iguchi =

Iguchi (written 井口 literally "well mouth") is a Japanese surname. Notable people with the surname include:

- Bryan Iguchi, a professional snowboarder
- Miyuki Iguchi, Japanese athlete
- Motonari Iguchi (井口 基成), pianist
- Nami Iguchi (井口 奈己, born 1967), Japanese film director, screenwriter and editor
- Naruhito Iguchi (井口 成人), actor and voice actor
- Noboru Iguchi (井口 昇), film director and actor
- Tadahito Iguchi (井口 資仁), professional baseball player
- Toshihide Iguchi (井口 俊英), government bond trader
- Toshio Iguchi, engineer
- Yuka Iguchi (井口 裕香), voice actress

== See also ==
- 5561 Iguchi, a main-belt asteroid
