= Fossen =

Fossen is a Norwegian surname which can refer to these people:

- Aksel Fossen (1919–2009), Norwegian politician for the Labour Party
- Erling Fossen (born 1963) Norwegian nonfiction writer and former NRK-show host
- Hildegunn Fossen (born 1969) retired Norwegian biathlete
- Michael Fossen (born 1949) American playwright, television writer, and novelist
- Steve Fossen, Founding Member & Original Bassist for Heart (band)
- Thor I. Fossen (born 1963), Norwegian professor, author and founder of the company Marine Cybernetics
- Tor Røste Fossen (1940–2017), Norwegian former football player and coach
