= Ferlet =

Ferlet is a French surname. Notable people with the surname include:

- Édouard Ferlet (born 1971), French jazz pianist
- Laurent Ferlet (born 1961), French pianist and film music composer
- Roger Ferlet (born 1948), French astrophysicist, namesake of minor planet 44360 Ferlet
- Véronique Ferlet-Cavrois, French electrical engineer
