= Datcu =

Datcu is a surname. Notable people with the surname include:

- Ilie Datcu (born 1937), Romanian footballer and coach
- Mihai Datcu, German engineer
