= David Lynch (disambiguation) =

David Lynch (1946–2025) was an American film director.

David Lynch may also refer to:

- David Lynch (electrical engineer) (born 1940), American electrical engineer
- David Lynch (Gaelic footballer), Westmeath player
- David Lynch (quarterback) (born 2004), American football player
- David Lynch (wine expert), American writer and wine expert
- David Lynch, American singer formerly with the Platters
- David Lynch, co-founder of the American Front
- Dave Lynch (1902–1958), Australian rules footballer

== See also ==
- David Lynch Scott (1845–1924), Canadian lawyer and judge
