= Sandborn =

- Sandborn, Indiana is a geographic place;
- Peter Sandborn, American engineer
