= Yaakov Bar-Shalom =

Electrical engineer

- יעקב בר-שלום
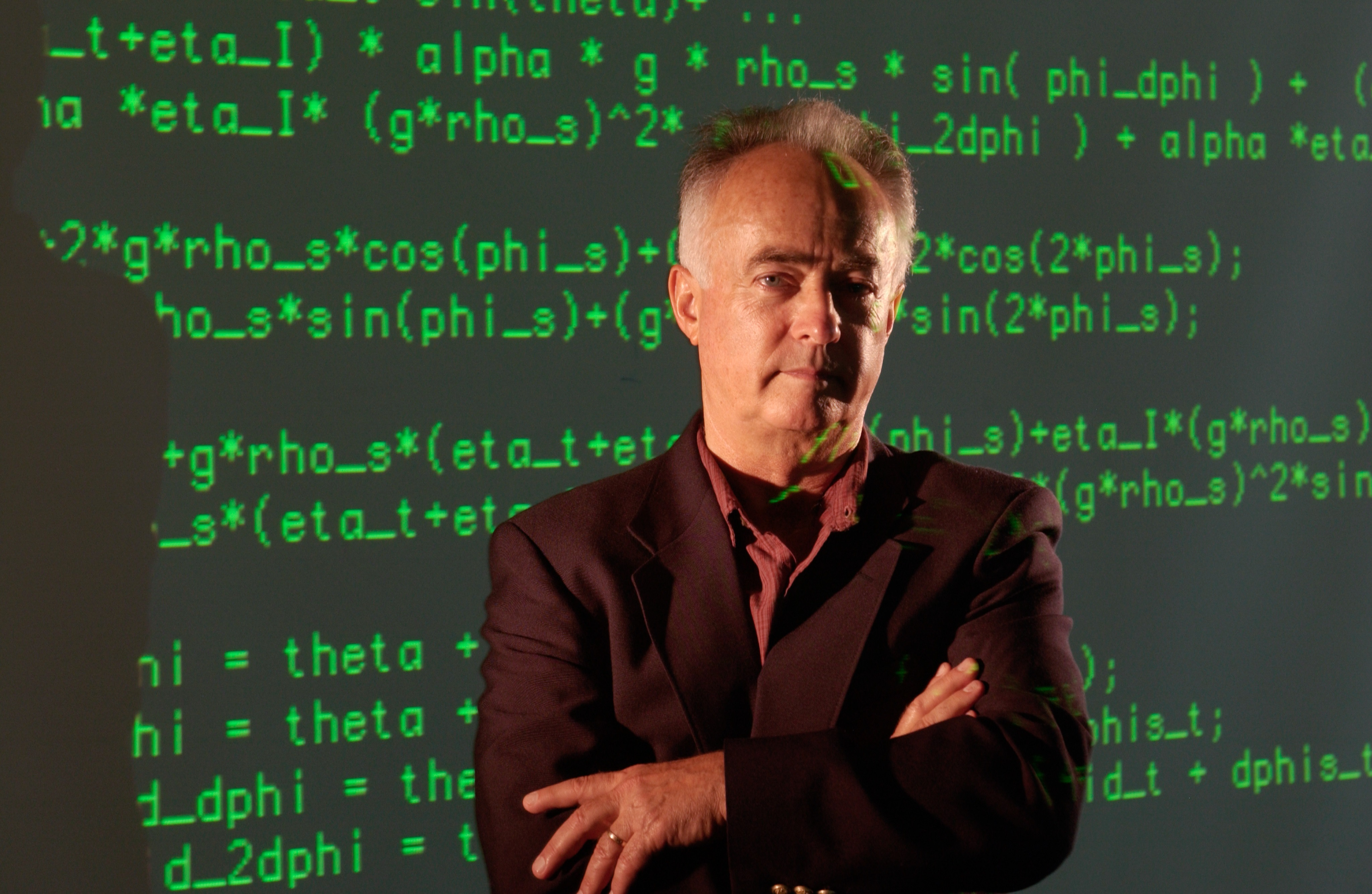
- Born: Jakob Friedman; May 11, 1941; Timișoara, Romania
- Education: Technion, Princeton University
- Awards: ISIF Award for a Lifetime of Excellence in Information Fusion (2015); Connecticut Medal of Technology (2012); IEEE Dennis J. Picard Medal for Radar Technologies and Applications (2008)
- Scientific career
- Fields: Estimation theory Target tracking Sensor fusion
- Workplaces: University of Connecticut

Yaakov Bar-Shalom (Hebrew: יעקב בר-שלום; born May 11, 1941) is an Israeli-American electrical engineer and academic known for his work in target tracking, estimation theory, and sensor fusion. His research includes tracking solutions when the origins or identities of sensor detections are ambiguous, and the interacting multiple model (IMM) approach for tracking maneuvering targets. These innovations have been adopted in both defense and commercial tracking systems.

== Early life and education ==
Bar-Shalom was born in Timișoara, Romania in 1941, to a Hungarian-speaking Jewish family. He developed an early interest in mathematics and science and began university studies at the Bucharest Polytechnic Institute, where he was influenced by Professor Remus Răduleț. Due to his family's exit visa application, he was expelled from the university. In 1960, he emigrated to Israel with his family.

At the Technion in Haifa, Bar-Shalom earned bachelor's and master's degrees in electrical engineering in 1963 and 1967, respectively. While continuing his education, he served as an engineer in the IDF Signal Corps. He received his Ph.D. in electrical engineering from Princeton University in 1970, with a dissertation in control theory supervised by Stuart Schwartz.

== Career and research ==
After completing his doctorate, Bar-Shalom worked as a research scientist at Systems Control, Inc. in Palo Alto, California. In 1976, he joined the University of Connecticut as a tenure-track faculty member; he is now Board of Trustees Distinguished Professor of Electrical and Computer Engineering and Marianne E. Klewin Endowed Professor in Engineering. Bar-Shalom has also held visiting positions at Stanford University and the Naval Postgraduate School.

Bar-Shalom's research has shaped the fields of multiple target tracking (MTT) and sensor fusion, particularly dynamic estimation under measurement-origin uncertainty. In the 1970s, he introduced the probabilistic data association filter (PDAF) and joint probabilistic data association (JPDA) algorithms, providing a theoretical foundation for tracking targets in cluttered environments and extending the method to multiple-target tracking. His work also included the interacting multiple model (IMM) estimator for maneuvering targets and multi-sensor, multi-target tracking techniques.

Other topics in his work include bias estimation, performance bounds, low-observable target detection, out-of-sequence measurement processing, track fusion, and multi-sensor data association. Applications of his research include missile defense, air-traffic control, radar and sonar surveillance, and airport surface detection radar systems. In particular, JPDA algorithm is adopted by Raytheon's THAAD radar and ASDE-X radar. In his career, Bar-Shalom has published more than 650 papers and book chapters and has coauthored or edited eight books.

== Awards and honors ==
Bar-Shalom is a Fellow of the Institute of Electrical and Electronics Engineers (IEEE). He received the IEEE Control Systems Society Distinguished Member Award in 1987; the UConn AAUP Award for Excellence in Research in 1988; the J. Mignona Data Fusion Award from the DoD JDL Data Fusion Group in 2002; the IEEE Dennis J. Picard Medal for Radar Technologies and Applications in 2008; the Connecticut Medal of Technology in 2012; and the IEEE Aerospace and Electronic Systems Society Pioneer Award in 2022.

In 2015, Bar-Shalom received the ISIF Award for a Lifetime of Excellence in Information Fusion. In 2016, the award was renamed the Yaakov Bar-Shalom Award for a Lifetime of Excellence in Information Fusion.

== Bibliography ==
=== Dissertation ===
- Bar-Shalom, Yaakov (1970). Identification and Estimation in Linear Discrete-Time Systems with Unknown Parameters (Ph.D. thesis). Princeton University.

=== Books ===
- Bar-Shalom, Yaakov; Willett, Peter K.; Tian, Xin (2011). Tracking and Data Fusion. Storrs, CT, USA: YBS Publishing.
- Bar-Shalom, Yaakov; Li, X. Rong; Kirubarajan, Thiagalingam (2004). Estimation with Applications to Tracking and Navigation: Theory Algorithms and Software. Wiley.
- Bar-Shalom, Yaakov; Li, Xiao-Rong (1993). Estimation and Tracking: Principles, Techniques, and Software. Norwood, MA: Artech House.
- Bar-Shalom, Yaakov; Li, Xiao-Rong (1995). Multitarget-Multisensor Tracking: Principles and Techniques. Storrs, CT: YBS Publishing.
- Bar-Shalom, Yaakov (1990). Multitarget-Multisensor Tracking: Advanced Applications. Norwood, MA: Artech House.

=== Articles ===
- Bar-Shalom, Yaakov; Tse, Edison (1975). "Tracking in a Cluttered Environment with Probabilistic Data Association". Automatica. 11 (5): 451–460. doi:10.1016/0005-1098(75)90021-7.
- Bar-Shalom, Yaakov (1978). "Tracking Methods in a Multitarget Environment". IEEE Transactions on Automatic Control. 23 (4): 618–626.
- Bar-Shalom, Yaakov (1981). "On the Track-to-Track Correlation Problem". IEEE Transactions on Automatic Control. 26 (2): 571–572.
- Kirubarajan, T.; Bar-Shalom, Yaakov; Wang, Y. (April 2001). "Passive Ranging of a Low Observable Ballistic Missile in a Gravitational Field". IEEE Transactions on Aerospace and Electronic Systems. 37 (2): 481–494. doi:10.1109/7.937463.
- Bar-Shalom, Yaakov (2002). "Update with Out-of-Sequence Measurements in Tracking: Exact Solution". IEEE Transactions on Aerospace and Electronic Systems. 38 (3): 769–777. doi:10.1109/TAES.2002.1039398.
- Blom, Henk A. P.; Bar-Shalom, Yaakov (1988). "The Interacting Multiple Model Algorithm for Systems with Markovian Switching Coefficients". IEEE Transactions on Automatic Control. 33 (8): 780–783. doi:10.1109/9.1299.
- Bar-Shalom, Yaakov; Daum, Fred; Huang, Jim (2009). "The Probabilistic Data Association Filter". IEEE Control Systems Magazine. 29 (6): 82–100. doi:10.1109/MCS.2009.934469.
