= Track-before-detect =

In radar technology and similar fields, track-before-detect (TBD) is a concept according to which a signal is tracked before declaring it a target. In this approach, the sensor data about a tentative target are integrated over time and may yield detection in cases when signals from any particular time instance are too weak against clutter (low signal-to-noise ratio) to register a detected target.

The TBD approach may be applied both for pure detection when the tentative target displays a very small amount of apparent motion, as well as for actual motion tracking. In the first case the problem is considerably simpler, both in terms of the amount of calculation and the complexity of algorithms.

== See also ==
- Track while scan
- Vehicle tracking system
