= Oscar Au =

Hong Kong engineer

- 區子廉
- Born: Oscar Chi-Lim Au
- Education: Princeton University; University of Toronto
- Scientific career
- Fields: Digital image processing
- Thesis: Signal Detection in Non-Gaussian Transformation Noise (1991)
- Doctoral advisor: John B. Thomas

Oscar Chi-Lim Au is an engineer who worked as a professor at the Hong Kong University of Science and Technology, Hong Kong, from 1992 to 2014.

He was elected as a Fellow of the Institute of Electrical and Electronics Engineers (IEEE) in 2012 for his contributions to multimedia coding and security. He received the B.A.Sc. degree from the University of Toronto in 1986, and the M.A. and Ph.D. degrees from Princeton University, in 1988 and 1991, respectively, under the supervision of John B. Thomas. Currently, he is the Vice President (Strategic Development and Alliance) of Origin Wireless, Inc., which was founded by Prof. K. J. Ray Liu to pioneer wireless AI for wireless sensing and indoor positioning.
