= John B. Thomas =

American engineer and educator (1925–2018)

John Bowman Thomas
- Born: July 14, 1925
- Died: September 13, 2018 (aged 93)
- Education: Stanford University (Ph.D.)
- Scientific career
- Fields: Electrical engineering
- Workplaces: Princeton University
- Doctoral advisor: Willis W. Harman
- Doctoral students: Vincent Poor; Jack Wolf; Abraham H. Haddad; Dag Tjøstheim; Hisashi Kobayashi; Bob Kahn; Eugene Wong; Oscar C. Au

John Bowman Thomas (July 14, 1925 – September 13, 2018) was an American electrical engineer, educator, and a professor at Princeton University. He received his Ph.D. from Stanford University in 1955. He was the adviser of numerous outstanding scientists, including Vincent Poor, Jack Wolf, Abraham H. Haddad, Dag Tjøstheim, Hisashi Kobayashi, Bob Kahn, Eugene Wong, and Oscar C. Au. His PhD adviser was Willis W. Harman, a President of IONS.
