= Frank van Diggelen =

GPS scientist at Google

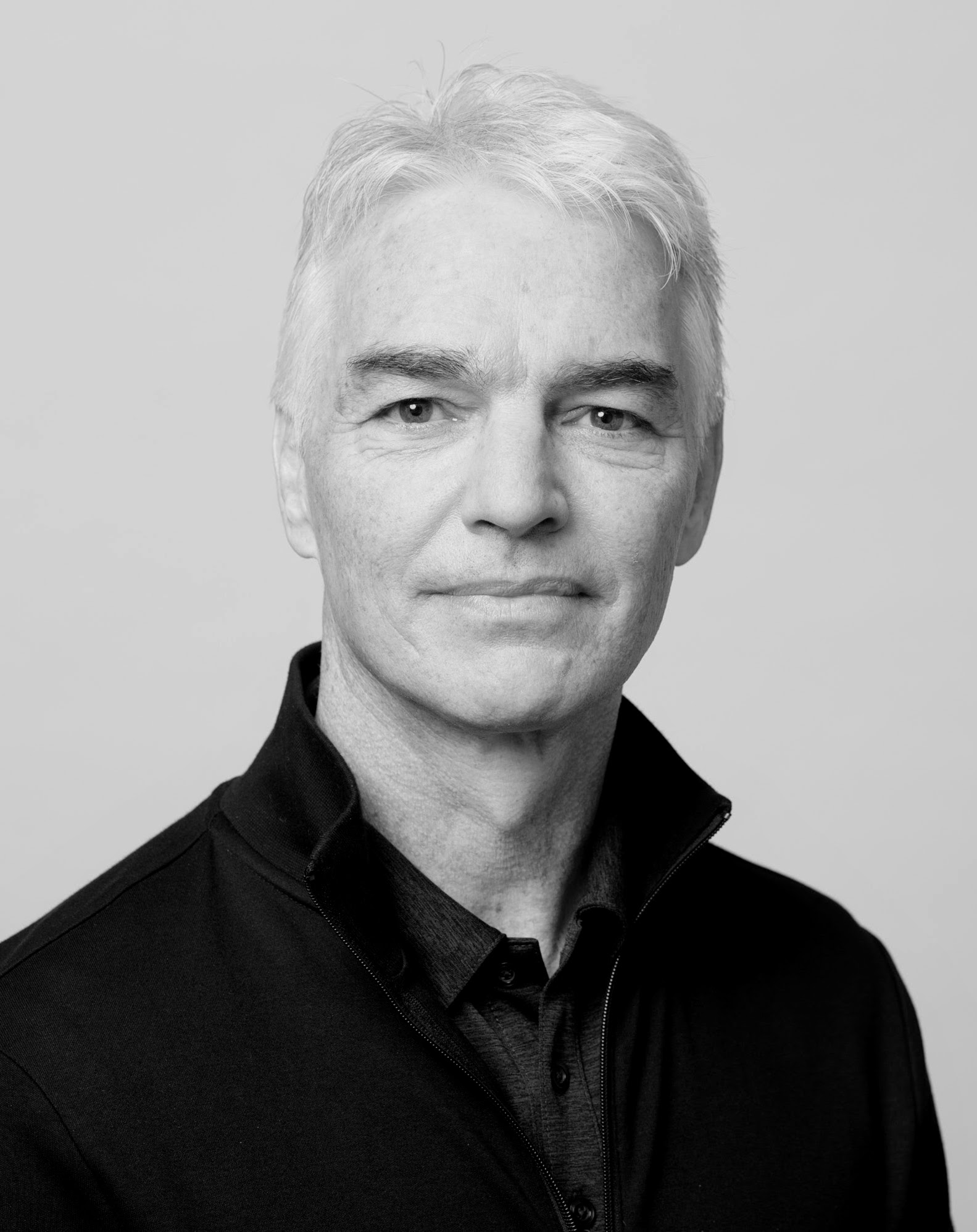
- Born: Frank Stephen Tromp van Diggelen; Cape Town
- Citizenship: American
- Education: University of Cambridge
- Spouse: Alison van Diggelen
- Scientific career
- Workplaces: Google; Broadcom
- Thesis: Hadamard weighting in robust control (1992)
- Doctoral advisor: Keith Glover
- Website: https://frankvandiggelen.com/

Frank Stephen Tromp van Diggelen is a Distinguished Engineer at Google. His work concerns GPS/GNSS navigation. He helped to create some of the first GPS chips used in commercial smartphones. Van Diggelen is a fellow of the IEEE, Institute of Navigation and Royal Institute of Navigation.

== Early life and education ==
Van Diggelen was born in Cape Town to Tromp and Judith van Diggelen during the apartheid era. As a child, he became interested in engineering through making Meccano sets with his mother. He was conscripted to join the South African Navy at 18, working as a navigation officer. He later received a scholarship to attain a Bachelor's degree at the University of the Witwatersrand. After another successful scholarship, van Diggelen received a PhD in electrical engineering from the University of Cambridge in 1992, advised by Keith Glover. His dissertation was Hadamard Weighting in Robust Control.

== Career ==
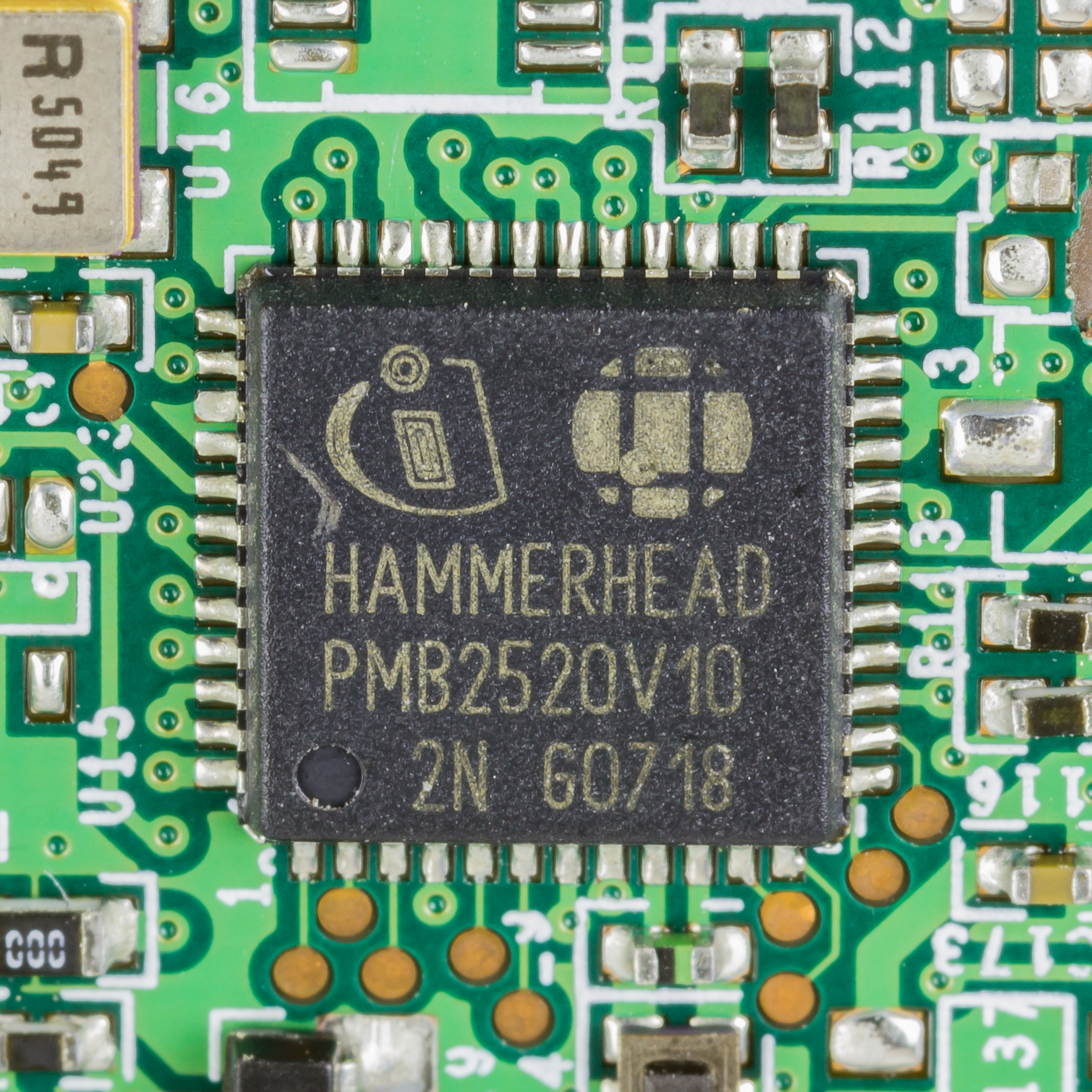
The Hammerhead GPS chip on the TomTom One

Van Diggelen is a Distinguished Engineer at Google, where he heads the GNSS team for Android. He invented coarse-time GNSS navigation and is the co-inventor of Long Term Orbits (LTO) for A-GPS. Van Diggelen is currently the president of the Institute of Navigation (2021-); he was previously the vice chair of the institute’s Satellite Division. Van Diggelen has previously held positions at the Navsys Corporation, Ashtech, Magellan Navigation and Global Locate. He has around 100 US patents to his name.

During his time at Cambridge University, Keith Glover (van Diggelen's PhD advisor) recommended van Diggelen for a job with Alison Brown of Navsys, a government GPS contractor based in Colorado Springs. He started working with the company in 1992. During his time at Navsys, van Diggelen assisted with the creation of receiver autonomous integrity monitoring (RAIM) to be used by the U.S. Coast Guard.

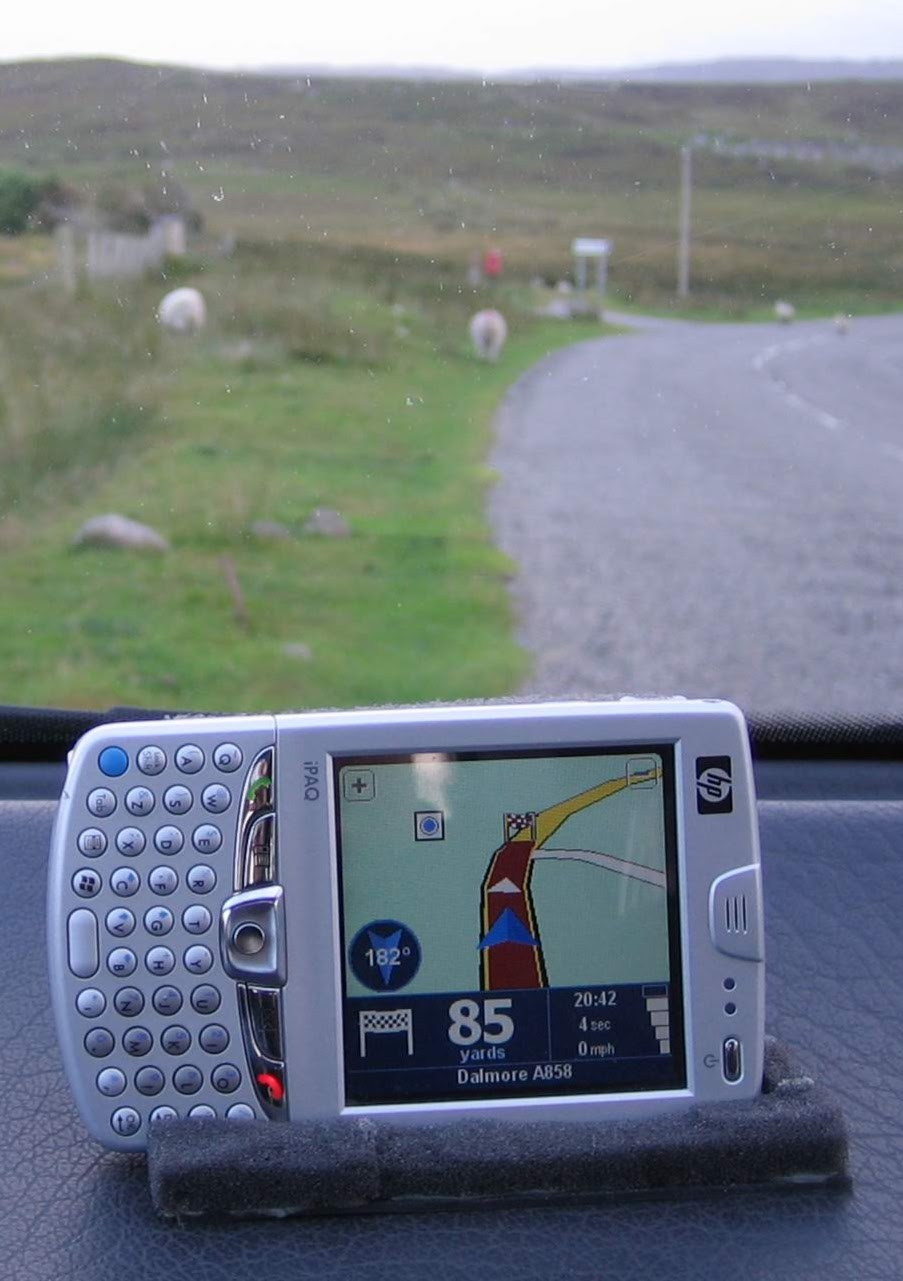
The HP iPaq 6900

After working at Ashtech (which later merged with Magellan Navigation), van Diggelen started work at Global Locate, a California based GPS company. He served as Vice President of technology & chief navigation officer. At Global Locate, he worked on the team that produced the first GPS smartphone chip, used in the HP iPaq. TomTom was also involved in the project and later collaborated with Global Locate to produce the TomTom One. The device used Global Locate's Hammerhead chip, which was also used in the iPhone 3G.

After Global Locate was bought by the Broadcom Corporation, van Diggelen served as the company's Vice President of GPS Technology. At Broadcom, van Diggelen worked on the BCM4771 and BCM4774 GPS chips.

=== Teaching ===
Van Diggelen has also taught extensively. His first teaching experience came during his time at the University of Witwatersrand when he taught mathematics to high school children from Soweto and Alexandra. He is a consulting professor at Stanford University. In 2014, together with Per Enge, van Diggelen conducted a six-week long course on GPS through Stanford University and Coursera. The course was free and available online as a Massive Open Online Course (MOOC). The course is now available on YouTube. He also taught in Rwanda through the Institute of Navigation Satellite Division’s African Outreach Program. Van Diggelen is the author of the first A-GPS textbook: A-GPS: Assisted GPS, GNSS, and SBAS.

== Personal life ==
Van Diggelen is married to Alison van Diggelen, a technology journalist. They met while at Cambridge University. Now living in the San Francisco Bay Area, the couple has two children. In his free time, van Diggelen is fond of sailing, skiing and hiking.

== Awards and honours ==
- Made a fellow of the Institute of Navigation in 2015 "For contributions to satellite-based navigation for consumer applications, especially mobile handheld devices."
- 2015 Institute of Navigation Johannes Kepler Award "for his significant and fundamental contributions to the practical, affordable and enhanced use of satellite based navigation for consumer applications, especially for mobile handheld devices; contributions to GNSS interoperability; and dedication as a navigation educator."
- Made a fellow of the Royal Institute of Navigation in 2018 "In recognition of his innovative contributions to the science, technology and availability of mass-market GNSS"
- 2021 Royal Institute of Navigation Harold Spencer Jones Medal
- Elevated to fellow of the IEEE in 2022 "for contributions to assisted global navigation satellite systems for consumer applications"

== Publications ==
- Van Diggelen, Frank Stephen Tromp: Hadamard weighting in robust control. Dissertation, University of Cambridge, 1992
- Van Diggelen, Frank Stephen Tromp: A-GPS: Assisted GPS, GNSS, and SBAS. Artech House, 2009. ISBN 9781596933750
- Morton, Jade; Van Diggelen, Frank Stephen Tromp; Spilker, James; Parkinson, Bradford; Chih Lo, Sherman and Gao, Grace: Position, navigation, and timing technologies in the 21st century: integrated satellite navigation, sensor systems, and civil applications. Wiley, 2021. ISBN 9781119458401
