= Jack Wolf =

American computer scientist (1935–2011)

- Education: University of Pennsylvania (BS), Princeton University (PhD)
- Scientific career
- Fields: Electrical engineering
- Doctoral advisor: John B. Thomas

Jack Keil Wolf (March 14, 1935 – May 12, 2011) was an American researcher in information theory and coding theory.

== Biography ==
Wolf was born in 1935 in Newark, New Jersey, and graduated from Weequahic High School in 1952. He received his undergraduate degree from the University of Pennsylvania in 1956 and his Ph.D. from Princeton University in 1960 for his thesis "On the Detection and Estimation Problem for Multiple Nonstationary Random Processes". He held faculty appointments at New York University 1963–1965, the Polytechnic Institute of Brooklyn 1965–1973 and the University of Massachusetts Amherst 1973–1984, and worked at RCA Laboratories and Bell Laboratories. In 1984, he joined the University of California, San Diego, where he applied communication and information theory to magnetic storage. He also held a part-time appointment at Qualcomm since its formation in 1985. He was president of the IEEE Information Theory Society in 1974. He died on May 12, 2011.

== Awards and honors ==
- IEEE Fellow (1973)
- Guggenheim Fellow (1979)
- Member of the U.S. National Academy of Engineering (1993)
- IEEE Koji Kobayashi Computers and Communications Award (1998)
- Claude E. Shannon Award from the IEEE Information Theory Society (2001)
- IEEE Richard W. Hamming Medal (2004)
- Fellow of the American Academy of Arts and Sciences (2005)
- Member of the U.S. National Academy of Sciences (2010)
- Fellow of the American Association for the Advancement of Science
- Marconi Prize from and Fellow of the Marconi Society (2011)
