= IEEE Judith A. Resnik Award =

Awarded for outstanding contributions to space engineering

- Awarded for: Outstanding contributions to space engineering within the fields of interest of the IEEE
- Presented by: Institute of Electrical and Electronics Engineers
- First award: 1989
- Website: Judith A. Resnik Space Award

The IEEE Judith A. Resnik Award is a technical field award presented by the Institute of Electrical and Electronics Engineers (IEEE) to either an individual, or a team, "for outstanding contributions to space engineering within the fields of interest of the IEEE".

The award is named in honor of Judith A. Resnik, a mission specialist, killed when the Space Shuttle Challenger disintegrated during launch in January 1986 and was established later that year. Recipients receive a bronze medal, certificate, and honorarium.

Through 2012, the IEEE administered the award process. The IEEE Aerospace and Electronic Systems Society assumed administration of the award starting in 2015.

== Recipients ==
The following people have received the IEEE/IEEE-AESS Judith A. Resnik Award:

- 2026: Daniel A Erwin
- 2025: Ryan S. Park
- 2024: Puneet Singla
- 2023: No Award
- 2022: Erik P. Blasch
- 2021: Azad M. Madni
- 2020: Margaret H. Hamilton
- 2018: Walter Delashmit
- 2017: Robert D. Briskman
- 2016: Richard Scott Erwin
- 2015: Maruthi Akella
- 2013: No Award
- 2012: Pramod Varshney
- 2011: Kamal Sarabandi
- 2010: Surendra Pal
- 2009: Sudhakar Rao
- 2008: Meyya Meyyappan
- 2007: Daniele Mortari
- 2006: Kim M. Ess
- 2005: Marcos A. Bergamo
- 2004: Anthony W. England
- 2003: Suresh M. Joshi
- 2002: Yvonne C. Brill
- 2001: No Award
- 2000: No Award
- 1999: Christopher S. Ruf
- 1998: Oliver M. Collins
- 1997: Rodney S. Rougelot
- 1996: Paul G. Steffes
- 1995: Leandre Pourcelot
- 1994: Johannes Dietrich
- 1993: Bonnie J. Dunbar
- 1992: No Award
- 1991: Dr.Elfreda Chang
- 1990: Douglas K. Waineo
- 1989: Peter Michael Bay

== See also ==
- List of space technology awards
