= Hisashi Kobayashi =

Japanese engineer (1938–2023)

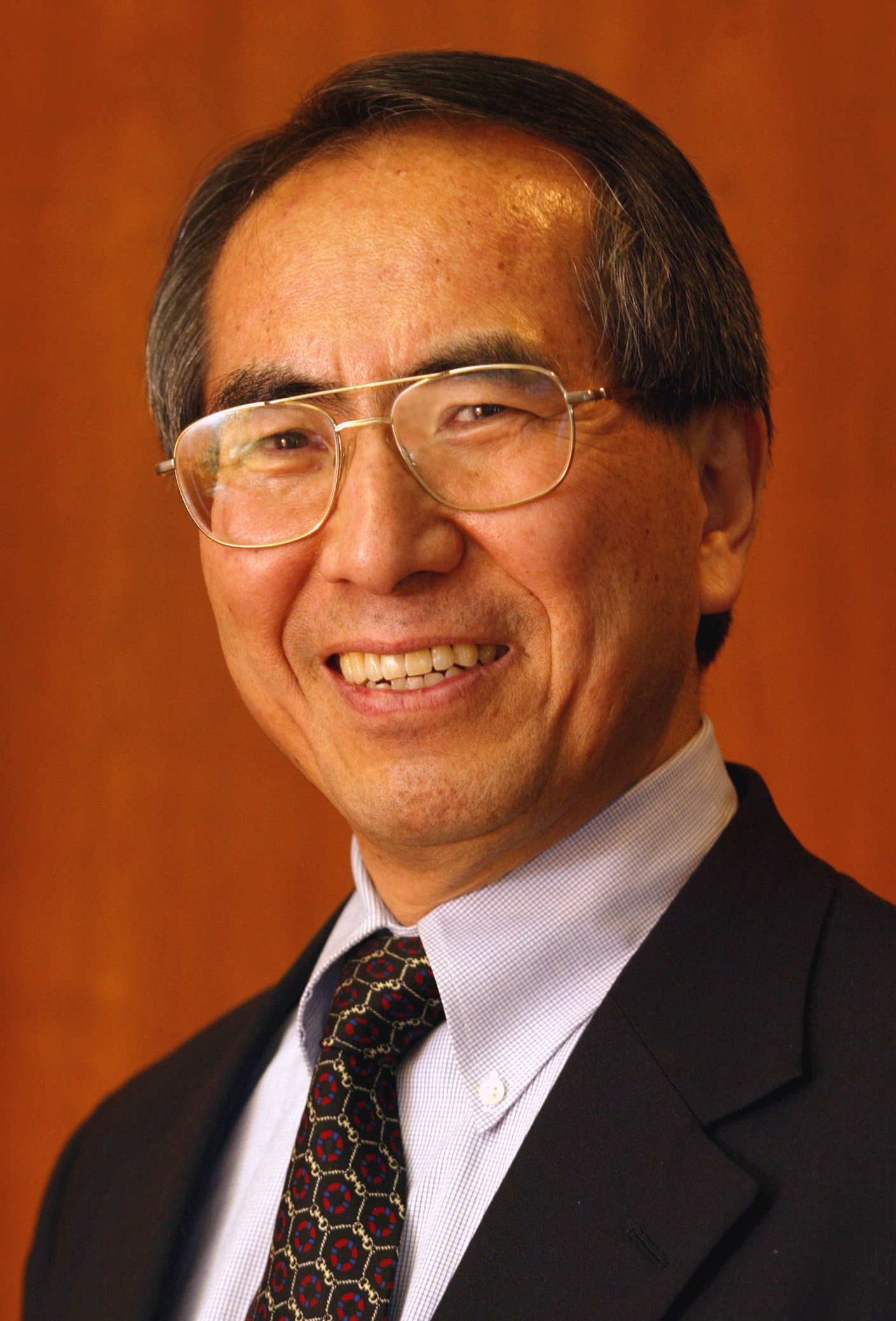
- Born: June 13, 1938; Tokyo, Japan
- Died: March 9, 2023; Tokyo, Japan
- Education: University of Tokyo (BE and ME); Princeton University (MA and PhD)(PhD)
- Awards: Honorary doctorate degree awarded by Ghent University, Belgium (March 22, 2019); C&C Prize (2012) Eduard Rhein Technology Award (2005) with Dolivo and Eleftheriou; Alexander von Humboldt Foundation's Senior US Scientist Award (1979); IFIP's Silver Core Medal (1980)
- Scientific career
- Workplaces: IBM Thomas J. Watson Research Center; University of California, Los Angeles; University of Hawaiʻi; Stanford University; Technische Universität Darmstadt; Free University of Brussels; IBM Japan Science Institute; Princeton University; Research Center for Advanced Science & Technology (RCAST) of the University of Tokyo; University of Victoria, Canada; National Institute of Information and Communications Technology, Japan;
- Thesis: Representations of Complex-Valued Vector Processes and Their Application to Estimation and Detection (1967)
- Doctoral advisor: John B. Thomas

Hisashi Kobayashi (Japanese: 小林久志 Kobayashi Hisashi;) (June 13, 1938 – March 9, 2023) was the Sherman Fairchild University Professor of Electrical Engineering and Computer Science, emeritus at Princeton University in Princeton, New Jersey. His fields of expertise included applied probability; queueing theory; system modeling and performance analysis; digital communication and networks; network architecture; investigation of the Riemann hypothesis; and stochastic modeling of an infectious disease. He was a Senior Distinguished Researcher at the National Institute of Information and Communications Technology (NICT), Japan from September 2008 to March 2016.

He was president of Friends of UTokyo, Inc. (FUTI), New York from April 2011 to September 2015, chair of its advisory committee from September 2015 to September 2019, and an advisory member (September 2019 to present). He also serves on the board of directors, Armstrong Memorial Research Foundation, Inc. from September 2008 to August 2021.

== Early life in Japan ==
Hisashi Kobayashi was born in Tokyo, Japan. The mathematician Shoshichi Kobayashi (1932–2012) was Hisashi's elder brother.

Hisashi studied at the University of Tokyo, and completed a Bachelor of Engineering and Master of Engineering in electrical engineering in 1961 and 1963, respectively. He was a recipient of Sugiyama Scholarship (1958–61) and RCA David Sarnoff Scholarship (1960). He worked as a radar system designer at Toshiba, Kawasaki in 1963–65.

== Life and career in the United States ==
In 1965 Kobayashi came to the United States as a recipient of the Orson Desaix Munn Fellowship of Princeton University and received a PhD degree in electrical engineering in 1967.

He worked for the IBM Thomas J. Watson Research Center at Yorktown Heights, New York, for fifteen years (1967–1982). He was a research staff member in its Applied Research Department from 1967 to 1970, where he worked on seismic signal processing, data transmission theory, digital magnetic recording, and image compression algorithms. In 1971 he moved to its Computer Science Department as manager of the then newly created, "System Measurement and Modeling" group, was promoted in 1976 to Senior Manager of "Systems Analysis and Algorithms", and in 1981 became Department Manager of "VLSI Design". During his tenure at IBM Research, he was granted sabbatical leaves to accept invitations from several institutions. He was a visiting professor at the University of California, Los Angeles (September 1969 – March 1970), University of Hawaii (July 1975 – December 1975), Stanford University (January 1976 – June 1976), Technische Universität Darmstadt (September 1979 – August 1980), and Free University of Brussels (September 1980 – December 1980).

In 1982, Kobayashi was appointed the founding director of the IBM Japan Science Institute (later named as IBM Tokyo Research Laboratory) in 1982, and served in that position until 1986, when he joined Princeton University's faculty as Dean of the School of Engineering and Applied Science (SEAS), and the Sherman Fairchild University Professor of Electrical Engineering and Computer Science.

He was Dean from 1986 to 1991, and was responsible for establishing multiple interdisciplinary and/or inter-institutional centers and programs in academic disciplines as material science, opto-electronics, earthquake engineering, surface engineered materials, discrete mathematics for computer science, and plasma etching.

After finishing his tenure as Dean, he was an NEC C&C visiting professor at the RCAST (Research Center for Advanced Science and Technology), the University of Tokyo (1991–1992). Since the fall of 1992 until June 2008, he assumed a full-time research and teaching position at Princeton University's Department of Electrical Engineering.

He was a BC ASI Visiting Fellow at the University of Victoria in Canada from 1998 to 1999.

He retired from Princeton University in June 2008. In the fall semesters of 2012–13, and 2013–14, however, Kobayashi was a visiting lecturer at Princeton University and taught a graduate course on "ELE 526: Random processes in information systems".

He was a distinguished researcher (part-time) at the National Institute of Information and communications technology (NICT) of Japan in 2008–2016.

Since 2016 he was challenging the Riemann hypothesis. Since 2020, he was actively pursuing a new stochastic model of an infectious disease.

== Major awards and honors ==
- 1977: Fellow of IEEE (Institute of Electrical and Electronics Engineers)
- 1979: Silver Core Award of IFIP (International Federation of Information Processing)
- 1979: Humboldt Prize (Senior U.S. Scientist Award) from Alexander von Humboldt Foundation, West Germany
- 1984: Member of Engineering Academy of Japan
- 1992: Fellow of IEICE (Institute of Electronics, Information and Communications Engineers) of Japan
- Commendation List for Outstanding Teaching, School of Engineering and Applied Science, Princeton University
- 2005: Life Fellow of IEEE
- 2005: Technology Award from Eduard Rhein Foundation of Germany, with Dolivo and Eleftheriou, for their contributions for their pioneering contributions to PRML (Partial-Response, Maximum-Likelihood), which allowed dramatic increases in the storage capacity of computer hard disks.
- 2006: Guest speech at the Entrance Ceremony of the University of Tokyo, Graduate School
- 2012: C&C Prize from NEC Foundation, Japan for his "pioneering and leading contributions both to the invention of high-density and highly reliable digital recording technology and to the creation and development of a performance-evaluation methodology for computer and communication systems."
- 2019: Honorary doctorate degree from Ghent University, Belgium, for his "research contributions in queuing theory, systems performance modeling and evaluation, the Riemann hypothesis." University of Ghent article and photos from ceremony.

== List of books ==
- Probability, Random Processes and Statistical Analysis (2012), coauthored by Brian L. Mark and William Turin, Cambridge University Press.
- System Modeling and Analysis: Foundations of System Performance Evaluation(2009), coauthored with Brian L. Mark, Pearson/Prentice Hall.
- Modeling and Analysis: An Introduction to System Performance Evaluation Methodology(1978)，Addison-Wesley Publishing Company.
