= Michael Braasch =

American GPS scientist (1966–2024)

Michael S. Braasch (September 2, 1966 – September 22, 2024) was an American scientist in the field of GPS navigation. He was a professor at Ohio University and a fellow of the IEEE and ION.

== Education ==
Braasch obtained a bachelor's degree in electrical engineering in 1988. He continued his studies, receiving a master's degree a year later. Braasch received a PhD in electrical engineering in 1992. All his degrees were from Ohio University.

== Career ==
Braasch held the William F. Thomas Professorship at Ohio University, a seat he had held from 2004. His work on GPS multipath mitigation and Selective Availability is held in high regard in the scientific community. He was also director of Ohio University's Avionics Engineering Center where he was a researcher from 1985. Outside of Ohio University, Braasch had worked with the Delft University of Technology, the University of Canterbury and NATO AGARD. He was a member of ION from 1989. Braasch served as an advisor to the Federal Aviation Administration and International Civil Aviation Organization.

== Death ==
Braasch died from pancreatic cancer at his home, on September 22, 2024, at the age of 58.

== Awards and honors ==
- 1992 RTCA William E. Jackson Award for the best dissertation in the avionics area.
- Made a Fellow of ION in 2009.
- Elevated to a Fellow of the IEEE in 2023 "for contributions to GPS multipath error characterization and mitigation".
