= Daniele Mortari =

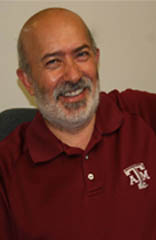
- Daniele Mortari
- Born: June 30, 1955 (age 71); Colleferro (Italy)
- Education: Sapienza University of Rome
- Known for: Flower Constellations k-vector Range Searching Technique; The Theory of Functional Connections
- Awards: 2021 IAA Member; 2007 IEEE Judith A. Resnik Award; 2015 AAS Dirk Brouwer Award Fellow IEEE; Fellow AAS
- Website: mortari.tamu.edu

Daniele Mortari (born 30 June 1955) is Professor of Aerospace Engineering at Texas A&M University and Chief Scientist for Space for Texas A&M ASTRO Center. Mortari is known for inventing the Flower Constellations, the k-vector range searching technique, and the Theory of functional connections.

Mortari was elected Member of the International Academy of Astronautics in 2021 . He was named Fellow of the Institute of Electrical and Electronics Engineers in 2016 for contributions to navigational aspects of space systems", Fellow of the American Astronautical Society in 2012 "for outstanding contributions to astronautics", Fellow of Asia-Pacific Artificial Intelligence Association in 2021, recipient of 2015 AAS Dirk Brower Award "for seminal contributions to the theory and practice of spacecraft orbital and rotational dynamics, particularly attitude determination and satellite constellation design", and of the 2007 IEEE Judith A. Resnik Award "for innovative designs of orbiting spacecraft constellations, and efficient algorithms for star identification and spacecraft attitude estimation". His other notable awards include: the 2015 Herbert H. Richardson Fellow Award, the 2015 William Keeler Memorial Award, and the Best Paper Award, Mechanics Meeting Conference, Honorary Member of IEEE-AESS Space System Technical Panel, 3 NASA Group Achievement Award (1989, 2008, 2019), AIAA Associate Fellow (2007), and IEEE-AESS Distinguished Speaker .

== Flower constellations ==
The original theory of Flower Constellations has been proposed in 2004. Then, the theory has evolved, moving to the 2-D Lattice theory, to the 3-D lattice theory, and recently, to the Necklace theory. These constellations are particularly suitable for classic applications, such as space-based navigation systems (e.g., GPS and Galileo), Earth observation systems (global, regional, persistent, uniform, weighted), and communication systems. Some more advanced and futuristic applications, such as Hyland's intensity correlation interferometric system, configurations to provide global internet broadband service from space, and solar system communication networks, are currently studied.

== K-vector Range Searching Technique ==
The K-vector Range Searching Technique is a range searching technique that can be applied to fast retrieve data from any static database. The k-vector technique was initially proposed to identify stars observed by star trackers on board spacecraft. Then, it has been applied to solve different kinds of problems belonging to different fields, such as: 1) nonlinear functions inversion and intersection, 2) extensive sampling data generation with assigned analytical (or numerical) distribution, 3) find approximate solutions of nonlinear Diophantine equations, and 4) iso-surface identification for 3-dimensional data distributions and level set analysis.

== Theory of functional connections ==
The Theory of functional connections (TFC) is a mathematical framework generalizing interpolation. TFC derives analytical functionals representing all possible functions subject to a set of linear constraints. These functionals restrict the whole space of functions to just the subspace that fully satisfies the constraints. Using these functionals, constrained optimization problems are transformed into unconstrained problems. Then, already available and optimized solution methods can be used. The TFC theory has been developed for multivariate rectangular domains subject to absolute, integral, relative, and linear combinations of constraints. Numerically efficient applications of TFC have already been implemented in optimization problems, especially in solving differential equations. In this area, TFC has unified initial, boundary, and multi-value problems by providing fast solutions at machine-error accuracy. This approach has already been applied to solve, in real-time, direct optimal control problems, such as autonomous landing on a large planetary body. Additional applications of TFC are found in nonlinear programming and calculus of variations, in Radiative TransferCompartmental models in epidemiology, and in Machine learning, where orders of magnitude improvements in speed and accuracy are obtained thanks to the search-space restriction enabled by TFC.

Implementations of TFC in neural networks were first proposed by the Deep-TFC framework, then by the X-TFC using an Extreme learning machine, and by the Physics-informed neural networks (PINN). In particular, TFC allowed PINN to overcome the unbalanced gradients problem that often causes PINNs to struggle to accurately learn the underlying differential equation solution.
