= Roy Streit =

American electrical engineer

Roy L. Streit is an electrical engineer and Fellow of the Institute of Electrical and Electronics Engineers.

== Education and career ==
Streit obtained his B.A. in physics and mathematics from East Texas State University in 1968. He then studied mathematics at the University of Missouri in Columbia, Missouri, where he received his M.A. degree in 1970. Eight years later he completed his Ph.D. at the University of Rhode Island. From 1981 through 1984, he held visiting positions at Stanford University and Yale University. In 1989, Streit was a visiting scientist at the Department of Statistics of the University of Adelaide.

For many years Streit was a research scientist at the Naval Undersea Warfare Center, where he worked on data fusion technology for detecting and tracking undersea targets. In 1999, he received the Solberg Award from the American Society of Naval Engineers. In 2005, Streit left the NUWC and joined Metron, a consulting company in Virginia working on search and tracking technology. He was named a Fellow of the Institute of Electrical and Electronics Engineers (IEEE) in 2012 for his contributions to multi-target tracking, classification, and sonar signal processing.
