= Antonio De Maio =

Antonio De Maio from the University of Naples Federico II, Naples, Italy was named Fellow of the Institute of Electrical and Electronics Engineers (IEEE) in 2013 for contributions to radar signal processing.
