= Hassan Kojori =

Hassan A. Kojori

Hassan Kojori was named a Fellow of the Institute of Electrical and Electronics Engineers (IEEE) in 2014 for his contributions to the design and application of predictive and diagnostic algorithms in power electronics converters. He is an electrical engineer with Honeywell in Toronto, Ontario. He holds a PhD from the University of Toronto and is a licensed Professional Engineer in Ontario. He has over 35 years of experience in the field of power conversion, power distribution, energy storage and related systems optimization and control. Most recently as a Senior Principal Engineer with Honeywell, he was the Conversion Portfolio Leader for Aero Advanced Technologies responsible for research, development and technology demonstration of advanced Electric Power Systems for More Electric Aircraft and tactical vehicles. His original work on numerous technology firsts has resulted in more than 45 patent disclosures (29 granted), several trade secrets and more than 50 technical papers and proprietary industry reports. Dr. Kojori has been actively engaged in collaborative research in the general area of power electronics, Lithium-Ion battery energy storage systems and teaching and supervising graduate students with leading local and international universities for over 20 years. He was adjunct professor in the Department of Electrical and Computer Engineering (ECE) at the University of Toronto and Ryerson University for over 10 years and collaborated as an industry professor in the Institute for Automotive Research and Technology at McMaster. Currently, he is associate editor, IEEE Transactions on Transportation Electrification, advisory board member for ECE department at Ryerson University, University of Toronto Institute for Multidisciplinary Design & Innovation, Queen's Centre for Energy and Power Electronics Research (ePOWER), and represents Honeywell at The Downsview Aerospace Innovation and Research Consortium
