= Iram Weinstein =

Iram J. Weinstein is an engineer at Science Applications International Corp. in McLean, Virginia. He was named a Fellow of the Institute of Electrical and Electronics Engineers (IEEE) in 2014 for his work in signal processing and test methods for radar-detecting advanced aircraft and cruise missiles in severe terrain clutter.

Dr. Weinstein is the VP for Education and serving his third term on the AESS Board of Governors.
