= Giuseppe Fabrizio =

Australian electrical engineer

Giuseppe A. Fabrizio is an Australian electrical engineer with the Defence Science & Technology Group in Edinburgh, South Australia.

Fabrizio got his B.E. and Ph.D. degrees from the School of Electrical and Electronic Engineering at the University of Adelaide, South Australia in 1992 and 2000, respectively. Since 1993, Fabrizio serves for Defence Science and Technology Group of Australian Department of Defence. He was a leader of the Electronic Warfare and Signal Processing Section of the High Frequency Radar Branch from 2005 to 2015, during which he was responsible for the development and practical implementation of new electronic protection methods and durable adaptive array processing techniques to improve the operational performance of the Jindalee Operational Radar Network. In 2016, Fabrizio became a group leader of the Microwave Radar Systems Science and Technology Capability in DST Group, at which position he still remains.

Fabrizio was named a Fellow of the Institute of Electrical and Electronics Engineers (IEEE) in 2016 for his contributions to adaptive array signal processing in over-the-horizon radar systems.
