= Abraham H. Haddad =

Israeli control theorist

- Education: Princeton University; Technion – Israel Institute of Technology
- Awards: IEEE Centennial Medal; IEEE Third Millennium Medal.
- Scientific career
- Fields: Control theory
- Workplaces: Northwestern University
- Doctoral advisor: John B. Thomas

Abraham H. Haddad is an Israeli control theorist and the Henry and Isabelle Dever Professor in the Department of Electrical and Computer Engineering, Northwestern University, Evanston, Illinois, United States. Haddad is known for his contributions to the theory of hybrid systems.

== Biography ==
Abraham Haddad received his Bachelor of Science and Master of Science degrees from the Technion – Israel Institute of Technology in 1960 and 1963, respectively. He received his Master of Arts and Doctor of Philosophy (Ph.D.) in electrical engineering in 1964 and 1966, both from Princeton University.

Shortly after receiving his Ph.D., Haddad joined the faculty of the University of Illinois Urbana-Champaign, where he eventually held the title of professor of electrical engineering and research professor in the Coordinated Science Laboratory. He was a visiting associate professor at Tel-Aviv University from 1972 to 1973. He joined the School of Electrical and Computer Engineering at the Georgia Institute of Technology in 1983, and moved to Northwestern University in 1988.

At Northwestern, Haddad served as chairman of the department from 1988 to 1998, and as of September 1, 1998, he is also serving as director of the Master of Science in Information Technology Program. He was the interim chairman of the ECE Department during 2001–02.

From 1968 to 1979 Haddad was an advisor to the United States Army Aviation and Missile Command In 1979, he became a senior staff consultant with the Dynamics Research Corporation and served as the program director for Systems Theory and Operations Research at the National Science Foundation from 1979 to 1983.

Haddad is a Fellow of the Institute of Electrical and Electronics Engineers and American Association for the Advancement of Science. He is the recipient of the Distinguished Member Award from IEEE Control Systems Society, the IEEE Centennial Medal (1984), and the IEEE Third Millennium Medal.
