= Marina Ruggieri =

Marina Ruggieri from the University of Rome Tor Vergata, Rome, Italy was named Fellow of the Institute of Electrical and Electronics Engineers (IEEE) in 2014 for contributions to millimeter-wave satellite communications.
