= Bernard Mulgrew =

Scottish engineer

Bernard Mulgrew from the University of Edinburgh, Edinburgh, Scotland was named Fellow of the Institute of Electrical and Electronics Engineers (IEEE) in 2012 for contributions to linear and nonlinear equalizers for adaptive systems.
