= Radar tracker =

Radar component

A radar tracker is a component of a radar system, or an associated command and control (C2) system, that associates consecutive radar observations of the same target into tracks. It is particularly useful when the radar system is reporting data from several different targets or when it is necessary to combine the data from several different radars or other sensors for data fusion.

== Role of the radar tracker ==
A classical rotating air surveillance radar system detects target echoes against a background of noise. It reports these detections (known as "plots") in polar coordinates representing the range and bearing of the target. In addition, noise in the radar receiver will occasionally exceed the detection threshold of the radar's constant false alarm rate detector and be incorrectly reported as targets (known as false alarms). The role of the radar tracker is to monitor consecutive updates from the radar system (which typically occur once every few seconds, as the antenna rotates) and to determine those sequences of plots belonging to the same target, whilst rejecting any plots believed to be false alarms. In addition, the radar tracker is able to use the sequence of plots to estimate the current speed and heading of the target. When several targets are present, the radar tracker aims to provide one track for each target, with the track history often being used to indicate where the target has come from.

When multiple radar systems are connected to one reporting post, a multiradar tracker is often used to monitor the updates from all of the radars and form tracks from the combination of detections. In this configuration, the tracks are often more accurate than those formed from single radars, as a greater number of detections can be used to estimate the tracks. In addition to associating plots, rejecting false alarms and estimating heading and speed, the radar tracker also acts as a filter, in which errors in the individual radar measurements are smoothed out. In essence, the radar tracker fits a smooth curve to the reported plots and, if done correctly, can increase the overall accuracy of the radar system. A multisensor tracker extends the concept of the multiradar tracker to allow the combination of reports from different types of sensor - typically radars, secondary surveillance radars (SSR), identification friend or foe (IFF) systems and electronic warfare support measures (or electronic support measures (ESM)) data.

A radar track will typically contain the following information:

- Position (in two or three dimensions)
- Heading
- Speed
- Unique track number

In addition, and depending on the application or tracker sophistication, the track will also include:

- Civilian SSR Modes A, C, S information
- Military IFF Modes 1, 2, 3, 4 and 5 information
- Call sign information
- Track reliability or uncertainty information

== General approach ==
There are many different mathematical algorithms used for implementing a radar tracker, of varying levels of sophistication. However, they all perform steps similar to the following every time the radar updates:

- Associate a radar plot with an existing track (plot to track association)
- Update the track with this latest plot (track smoothing)
- Spawn new tracks with any plots that are not associated with existing tracks (track initiation)
- Delete any tracks that have not been updated, or predict their new location based on the previous heading and speed (track maintenance)

Perhaps the most important step is the updating of tracks with new plots. All trackers will implicitly or explicitly take account of several factors during this stage, including:

- a model for how the radar measurements are related to the target coordinates
- the errors on the radar measurements
- a model of the target movement
- errors in the model of the target movement

Using this information, the radar tracker attempts to update the track by forming a weighted average of the current reported position from the radar (which has unknown errors) and the last predicted position of the target from the tracker (which also has unknown errors). The tracking problem is made particularly difficult for targets with unpredictable movements (i.e., unknown target movement models), non-Gaussian measurement or model errors, non-linear relationships between the measured quantities and the desired target coordinates, detection in the presence of non-uniformly distributed clutter, missed detections or false alarms. In the real world, a radar tracker typically faces a combination of all of these effects; this has led to the development of an increasingly sophisticated set of algorithms to resolve the problem. Due to the need to form radar tracks in real time, usually for several hundred targets at once, the deployment of radar tracking algorithms has typically been limited by the available computational power.

== Plot to track association ==
In this step of the processing, the radar tracker seeks to determine which plots should be used to update which tracks. In many approaches, a given plot can only be used to update one track. However, in other approaches a plot can be used to update several tracks, recognising the uncertainty in knowing to which track the plot belongs. Either way, the first step in the process is to update all of the existing tracks to the current time by predicting their new position based on the most recent state estimate (e.g., position, heading, speed, acceleration, etc.) and the assumed target motion model (e.g., constant velocity, constant acceleration, etc.). Having updated the estimates, it is possible to try to associate the plots to tracks.

This can be done in several ways:

- By defining an "acceptance gate" around the current track location and then selecting:
  - the closest plot in the gate to the predicted position (nearest neighbor), or
  - the strongest plot in the gate
- By a statistical approach that choose the most probable location of plot through a statistical combination of all the likely plots. This approach has been shown to be good in situations of high radar clutter.
  - Probabilistic Data Association Filter (PDAF) or the Joint Probabilistic Data Association Filter (JPDAF)
  - Global nearest neighbor

Once a track has been associated with a plot, it moves to the track smoothing stage, where the track prediction and associated plot are combined to provide a new, smoothed estimate of the target location.

Having completed this process, some plots will remain unassociated with existing tracks and some tracks will remain without updates. This leads to the steps of track initiation and track maintenance.

== Track initiation ==
Track initiation is the process of creating a new radar track from an unassociated radar plot. When the tracker is first switched on, all the initial radar plots are used to create new tracks, but once the tracker is running, only those plots that couldn't be used to update an existing track are used to spawn new tracks. Typically a new track is given the status of tentative until plots from subsequent radar updates have been successfully associated with the new track. Tentative tracks are not shown to the operator and so they provide a means of preventing false tracks from appearing on the screen - at the expense of some delay in the first reporting of a track. Once several updates have been received, the track is confirmed and displayed to the operator. The most common criterion for promoting a tentative track to a confirmed track is the "M-of-N rule", which states that during the last N radar updates, at least M plots must have been associated with the tentative track - with M=3 and N=5 being typical values. More sophisticated approaches may use a statistical approach in which a track becomes confirmed when, for instance, its covariance matrix falls to a given size.

A variation of JPDA called JIPDA also estimates target existence, therefore handling plot-to-track, initialization, and maintenance.

== Track maintenance ==
Track maintenance is the process in which a decision is made about whether to end the life of a track. If a track was not associated with a plot during the plot to track association phase, then there is a chance that the target may no longer exist (for instance, an aircraft may have landed or flown out of radar cover). Alternatively, however, there is a chance that the radar may have just failed to see the target at that update, but will find it again on the next update. Common approaches to deciding on whether to terminate a track include:

- If the target was not seen for the past M consecutive update opportunities (typically M=3 or so)
- If the target was not seen for the past M out of N most recent update opportunities
- If the target's track uncertainty (covariance matrix) has grown beyond a certain threshold

== Track smoothing ==
In this important step, the latest track prediction is combined with the associated plot to provide a new, improved estimate of the target state as well as a revised estimate of the errors in this prediction. There is a wide variety of algorithms, of differing complexity and computational load, that can be used for this process.

=== Alpha-beta tracker ===
An early tracking approach, using an alpha beta filter, that assumed fixed covariance errors and a constant-speed, non-maneuvering target model to update tracks.

=== Kalman filter ===
The role of the Kalman Filter is to take the current known state (i.e., position, heading, speed and possibly acceleration) of the target and predict the new state of the target at the time of the most recent radar measurement. In making this prediction, it also updates its estimate of its own uncertainty (i.e., errors) in this prediction. It then forms a weighted average of this prediction of state and the latest measurement of state, taking account of the known measurement errors of the radar and its own uncertainty in the target motion models. Finally, it updates its estimate of its uncertainty of the state estimate. A key assumption in the mathematics of the Kalman filter is that measurement equations (i.e., the relationship between the radar measurements and the target state) and the state equations (i.e., the equations for predicting a future state based on the current state) are linear.

The Kalman filter assumes that the measurement errors of the radar, and the errors in its target motion model, and the errors in its state estimate are all zero-mean with known covariance. This means that all of these sources of errors can be represented by a covariance matrix. The mathematics of the Kalman filter is therefore concerned with propagating these covariance matrices and using them to form the weighted sum of prediction and measurement.

In situations where the target motion conforms well to the underlying model, there is a tendency of the Kalman filter to become "overconfident" of its own predictions and to start to ignore the radar measurements. If the target then manoeuvres, the filter will fail to follow the manoeuvre. It is therefore common practice when implementing the filter to arbitrarily increase the magnitude of the state estimate covariance matrix slightly at each update to prevent this.

=== Multiple hypothesis tracker (MHT) ===
The MHT allows a track to be updated by more than one plot at each update, spawning multiple possible tracks. As each radar update is received every possible track can be potentially updated with every new update. Over time, the track branches into many possible directions. The MHT calculates the probability of each potential track and typically only reports the most probable of all the tracks. For reasons of finite computer memory and computational power, the MHT typically includes some approach for deleting the most unlikely potential track updates. The MHT is designed for situations in which the target motion model is very unpredictable, as all potential track updates are considered. For this reason, it is popular for problems of ground target tracking in Airborne Ground Surveillance (AGS) systems.

The MHT calculates not only the probabilities of previously detected tracks, but also the probabilities of false alarms and new tracks. As a result, it might handle multiple parts of the radar tracker algorithm, i.e., the plot-to-track, the smoothing, and the initialization. MHT can be implemented as either hypothesis-oriented or track-oriented. The latter type organizes hypotheses into trees, and each track has a tree. Multiple frames of history can be used. TOMHT typically does not handle initialization and termination.

=== Interacting multiple model (IMM) ===
The IMM is an estimator which can either be used by MHT or JPDAF. IMM uses two or more Kalman filters which run in parallel, each using a different model for target motion or errors. The IMM forms an optimal weighted sum of the output of all the filters and is able to rapidly adjust to target maneuvers. While MHT or JPDAF handles the association and track maintenance, an IMM helps MHT or JPDAF in obtaining a filtered estimate of the target position.

== Nonlinear tracking algorithms ==
Non-linear tracking algorithms use a Non-linear filter to cope with the situation where the measurements have a non-linear relationship to the final track coordinates, where the errors are non-Gaussian, or where the motion update model is non-linear. The most common non-linear filters are:

- the Extended Kalman filter
- the Unscented Kalman filter
- the Particle filter

=== Extended Kalman filter (EKF) ===
The EKF is an extension of the Kalman filter to cope with cases where the relationship between the radar measurements and the track coordinates, or the track coordinates and the motion model, is non-linear. In this case, the relationship between the measurements and the state is of the form h=f(x) (where h is the vector of measurements, x is the target state and f(.) is the function relating the two). Similarly, the relationship between the future state and the current state is of the form x(t+1)=g(x(t)) (where x(t) is the state at time t and g(.) is the function that predicts the future state). To handle these non-linearities, the EKF linearises the two non-linear equations using the first term of the Taylor series and then treats the problem as the standard linear Kalman filter problem. Although conceptually simple, the filter can easily diverge (i.e., gradually perform more and more badly) if the state estimate about which the equations are linearised is poor.

The unscented Kalman filter and particle filters are attempts to overcome the problem of linearising the equations.

=== Unscented Kalman filter (UKF) ===
The UKF attempts to improve on the EKF by removing the need to linearise the measurement and state equations. It avoids linearization by representing the mean and covariance information in the form of a set of points, called sigma points. These points, which represent a distribution with specified mean and covariance, are then propagated directly through the non-linear equations, and the resulting updated samples are then used to calculate a new mean and variance. This approach then suffers none of the problems of divergence due to poor linearisation and yet retains the overall computational simplicity of the EKF.

=== Particle filter ===
The particle filter could be considered as a generalisation of the UKF. It makes no assumptions about the distributions of the errors in the filter and neither does it require the equations to be linear. Instead it generates a large number of random potential states ("particles") and then propagates this "cloud of particles" through the equations, resulting in a different distribution of particles at the output. The resulting distribution of particles can then be used to calculate a mean or variance, or whatever other statistical measure is required. The resulting statistics are used to generate the random sample of particles for the next iteration. The particle filter is notable in its ability to handle multi-modal distributions (i.e., distributions where the probability density function (PDF) has more than one peak). However, it is computationally very intensive and is currently unsuitable for most real-world, real-time applications.

== See also ==
- Passive radar - a form of radar which relies heavily on the radar tracker for its operation
- Radar - main article on radar systems
- Track before detect - an approach for combining the detection and tracking process to see very low-strength targets
