= Weihua Zhuang =

Canadian electrical engineer

Weihua Zhuang is a Canadian electrical engineer, a University Professor and University Research Chair at University of Waterloo and a Fellow of the Royal Society of Canada, Institute of Electrical and Electronics Engineers, Canadian Academy of Engineering and Engineering Institute of Canada.

Zhuang previously held a Canada Research Chair (tier 1) in Wireless Communication Networks. From 2007 to 2013, she was the editor-in-chief of IEEE Transactions on Vehicular Technology. From 2023 to 2024 she was the president of the IEEE Vehicular Technology Society.
