= Véronique Ferlet-Cavrois =

French electrical engineer

Véronique Ferlet-Cavrois is a researcher for the European Space Agency known for her work on the effects of radiation on electronics.

== Education and career ==
Ferlet-Cavrois was a student at the École nationale supérieure d'électronique et de radioélectricité de Grenoble, where she graduated in 1990.

She worked on radiation hardening of electronic devices for the Commissariat à l'Energie Atomique beginning in 1991, and received a habilitation in 2005 through the University of Grenoble. She moved to the European Space Agency in 2009. At the European Space Agency, she has headed the Power Systems, EMC and Space Environment Division.

== Recognition ==
Ferlet-Cavrois was elected as an IEEE Fellow in 2011, "for contributions to understanding of radiation effects on electronic devices". Her paper "Statistical Analysis of the Charge Collected in SOI and Bulk Devices under Heavy Ion and Proton Irradiation—Implications for Digital SETs" (as first of 12 authors) won the 2006 NSREC Outstanding Conference Paper Award at the IEEE Nuclear and Space Radiation Effects Conference.
