= Thor I. Fossen =

Norwegian cyberneticist

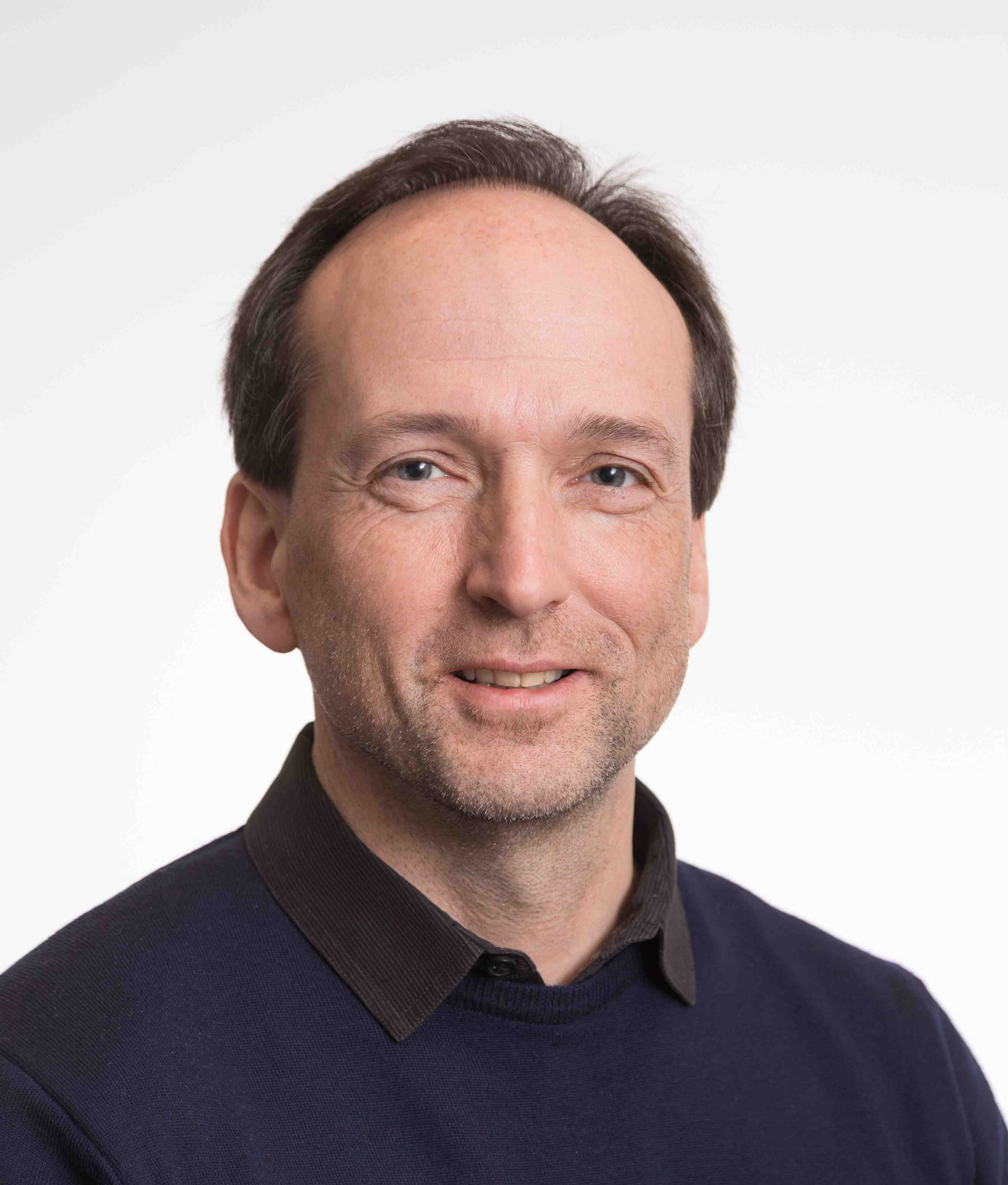
- Born: 3 January 1963 (age 63)
- Citizenship: Norway
- Awards: IEEE Fellow
- Scientific career
- Fields: Guidance system, navigation, control theory
- Institutions: Norwegian University of Science and Technology

Thor Inge Fossen (born 3 January 1963) is a Norwegian cyberneticist. Fossen received an MSc degree in Marine Technology (1987) and PhD in Engineering Cybernetics (1991), both from the Norwegian University of Science and Technology (NTNU). He is a Fulbright alumni, and he pursued postgraduate studies in Aerodynamics and Aeronautics at the Department of Aeronautics and Astronautics of the University of Washington, Seattle (1989-1990). At age 28, he was appointed associate professor of guidance, navigation, and control at NTNU, and two years later, he qualified as a full professor.

Fossen has made significant contributions to the fields of marine craft motion control systems, hydrodynamics, control theory, guidance systems and navigation. He has published approximately 400 papers on guidance, navigation and control (GNC), vehicle dynamics, and control systems for ships, underwater vehicles and uncrewed vehicles.

== Books ==
Fossen has authored four widely recognized textbooks. His first textbook, Guidance and Control of Ocean Vehicles in 1994 has become the standard reference in marine control systems. This was followed by Marine Control Systems: Guidance, Navigation and Control of Ships, Rigs and Underwater Vehicles in 2002 and the first edition of Handbook of Marine Craft Hydrodynamics and Motion Control in 2011. The second edition of this book was published in 2021 with updated content and expanded topics on guidance, navigation, and control of marine vehicles.

In addition to his textbooks, Fossen has co-authored three editorial volumes: Sensing and Control for Autonomous Vehicles: Applications to Land, Water and Air Vehicles in 2017, Parametric Resonance in Dynamical Systems in 2012, and New Directions in Nonlinear Observer Design in 1999.

== Recognition ==
Fossen has been elected as a member of the Norwegian Academy of Science and Letters and the Norwegian Academy of Technological Sciences. He was elevated to IEEE Fellow for his contributions to modeling and controlling of marine craft.

== Entrepreneurship ==
Fossen co-founded Marine Cybernetics, a company specializing in verifying and testing marine control systems, which is now part of DNV. He is also a co-founder of ScoutDI, a pioneering company developing tethered drone systems for situational awareness in confined spaces and industrial environments.
