= Peter Sandborn =

Fellow of the Institute of Electrical and Electronics Engineers

Peter Sandborn from the University of Maryland, College Park, MD was named Fellow of the Institute of Electrical and Electronics Engineers (IEEE) in 2014 for contributions to the analysis of cost and life-cycle of electronic systems.
