= Probabilistic data association filter =

The probabilistic data association filter (PDAF) is a statistical approach to the problem of plot association (target-measurement assignment) in a target tracking algorithm. Rather than choosing the most likely assignment of measurements to a target (or declaring the target not detected or a measurement to be a false alarm), the PDAF takes an expected value, which is the minimum mean square error (MMSE) estimate. The PDAF on its own does not confirm nor terminate tracks.

Whereas the PDAF is designed to track only one target in the presence of false alarms and missed detections, the Joint Probabilistic Data Association Filter (JPDAF) can handle multiple targets. The first real-world application of the PDAF was probably in the Jindalee Operational Radar Network, which is an Australian over-the-horizon radar (OTHR) network.

== Implementations ==
- MATLAB: The PDAF and JPDAF algorithms are implemented in the singleScanUpdate function that is part of the United States Naval Research Laboratory's free Tracker Component Library.
- Python: The PDAF and other data association methods are implemented in Stone-Soup. A tutorial demonstrates how the algorithms can be used.
