= Mihai Datcu =

Scientist at German Aerospace Center (DLR)

Mihai Datcu is a scientist from the German Aerospace Center. He was named Fellow of the Institute of Electrical and Electronics Engineers (IEEE) in 2013 for contributions to information mining of high resolution synthetic aperature radar and optical earth observation images.
