= Yu Morton =

Yu (Jade) Morton is a professor in the Department of Aerospace Engineering Sciences at the University of Colorado, Boulder. She was a professor in the Department of Electrical and Computer Engineering at Colorado State University from 2014 to 2017, and at Miami University of Ohio from 2000 to 2014.

Morton was named a Fellow of the Institute of Electrical and Electronics Engineers (IEEE) in 2014 for her contributions to the understanding of ionospheric effects on global navigation satellite signals.
