= Toshio Iguchi =

Japanese engineer

Toshio Iguchi from the National Institute of Information and Communications Technology, Tokyo, Japan was named Fellow of the Institute of Electrical and Electronics Engineers (IEEE) in 2014 for contributions to spaceborne meteorological instruments and radar.
