= David Lynch (electrical engineer) =

American electrical engineer

- Born: July 24, 1940 (age 86)
- Education: Washington University
- Occupation: Electrical engineer

David D. Lynch Jr. (born July 24, 1940) is an American electrical engineer.

== Life and career ==
Lynch attended Washington University.

In 1994, Lynch was named a fellow of the Institute of Electrical and Electronics Engineers, for his "leadership in the development of programmable signal processors and low probability of intercept radar".
