= List of fellows of IEEE Education Society =

The Fellow grade of membership is the highest level of membership and cannot be applied for directly by the member – instead the candidate must be nominated by others. This grade of membership is conferred by the IEEE Board of Directors in recognition of a high level of demonstrated extraordinary accomplishment. These individuals are part of the IEEE Education Society.

Year	Fellow	Citation
1968	Jose B. Cruz Jr.	For significant contributions in circuit theory and the sensitivity analysis of control systems
1982	J. David Irwin	For contributions to industrial electronics, control instrumentation, and engineering education
1983	Manoj Sachdev	For contributions to computer applications for power system analysis and protection
1984	Adel Sedra	"For contributions to the theory and design of active-RC and switched-capacitor filters, and to engineering education
1985	Eli Fromm	For contributions in biotelemetry, transducers, and bioengineering research.
1986	Bruce Eisenstein	For contributions to signal processing
1986	Kenneth Galloway	For contributions to the study of radiation effects in microelectronics
1986	Constantine A. Balanis	For contributions to electromagnetic education, geometrical theory of diffraction, and electromagnetic geotomography
1987	Vincent Poor	For contributions to the theory of robust linear filtering applied to signal detection and estimation.
1991	Martha E. Sloan	For contributions to engineering education, leadership in the development of computer engineering education as a discipline, and leadership in extending engineering education to women
1992	Phillip E. Allen	For contributions to electrical engineering education and microelectronics textbooks
1992	Delores Etter	For contributions to education through textbooks for engineering computing, and for technical leadership in the area of digital signal processing
1993	Leah Jamieson	For contributions to the design and characterization of parallel algorithms for speech, image, and signal processing applications.
1993	Ferdo Ivanek	For contributions to the development of fundamental-frequency microwave oscillators and amplifiers and their application in analog and digital radio relay systems
1995	S. C. Dutta Roy	For contributions to research in digital and analog signal processing
1997	Patricia Daniels	For contributions to engineering education
1998	Kenneth Connor	For contributions to the development of particle beam probing for nuclear fusion research.
1999	Rabab Ward	For contributions to digital signal processing applications in television and medical imaging
1999	Karan Watson	For contributions to engineering education, including outreach to women and minorities and accreditation
2001	Sarah Rajala	For contributions to engineering education
2001	Patrick Mantey	For leadership in engineering education, in research and in academic-industrial-government projects
2001	Bozenna Pasik-Duncan	For contributions to identification and stochastic adaptive control
2006	Susan Conry	For contributions to engineering education
2006	Sally L. Wood	For contributions to engineering education at university and pre-college levels.
2008	Karen Panetta	For leadership in engineering education and curriculum development to attract, retain, and advance women in engineering
2008	Cynthia Furse	For leadership in electromagnetics education
2009	Susan Hagness	For contributions to time-domain computational electromagnetics and microwave medical imaging
2009	Adam Skorek	For contributions to electro-thermal analysis of industrial processes
2010	Mariesa Crow	For contributions to power engineering education and to computational methods for power system analysis
2010	Jennifer Bernhard	For development of multifunctional, reconfigurable, and integrated antennas
2011	Min Wu	For contributions to multimedia security and forensics
2012	Maja Pantić	For contribution to automatic human behavior understanding and affective computing
2012	Raghunath Kashinath Shevgaonkar	For leadership in electrical engineering education in India
2014	Magdalena Salazar Palma	For contributions to the application of numerical techniques to electromagnetic modeling
2014	Gautam Biswas	For contributions to the modeling and simulation, diagnosis, and fault-adaptive control of complex dynamic systems
2014	Matthew Ohland	For contributions to and leadership in engineering education
2014	Magdalena Salazar-Palma	For contributions to the application of numerical techniques to electromagnetic modeling
2015	Sundaram Ramesh	For contributions to entrepreneurship in engineering education
2015	Susan Lord	For professional leadership and contributions to engineering education
2016	Laura Bottomley	For leadership in increasing student interest in STEM education
2016	Gerhard Hancke	For contributions to wireless sensor networks
2016	Branislav Notaros	For contributions to higher order methods in computational electromagnetics
2016	Diane Thiede Rover	For contributions to active learning methods in engineering education
2016	Noel Schulz	For leadership in advancing women in engineering and electric ship technologies
2017	Su Guaning	For leadership in defense technology and management of educational institutions
2018	Barbara Oakley	For outreach through online engineering pedagogy
2019	Farinaz Koushanfar	For contributions to hardware and embedded systems security and to privacy-preserving computing
2021	Cynthia Finelli	For leadership and scholarship in engineering education
2022	Ruth Bahar	For contributions to modeling and design of power-aware and noise-tolerant nanoscale computing systems
2022	Bonnie Ferri	For contributions to hands-on learning and leadership in higher education
2026	Rhonda Franklin	For leadership in microwave engineering education and workforce development

== See also ==
- List of IEEE Fellows
