= List of fellows of IEEE Electromagnetic Compatibility Society =

The Fellow grade of membership is the highest level of membership, and cannot be applied for directly by the member – instead the candidate must be nominated by others. This grade of membership is conferred by the IEEE Board of Directors in recognition of a high level of demonstrated extraordinary accomplishment.

| Year | Fellow | Citation |
|---|---|---|
| 1973 | Edward Wolff | "For contributions to antennas, geoscience instrumentation, and management of scientific projects" |
| 1978 | John Osepchuk | "For contributions to microwave technology and to microwave safety" |
| 1980 | Vernon Chartier | "For contributions to the understanding of corona phenomena associated with high-voltage power transmission lines" |
| 1980 | V Prasad Kodali | "For leadership in the planning of radar development" |
| 1982 | Farouk Rizk | "For contributions to the science of high-voltage technology and for technical leadership in the advancement of the electrical power industry" |
| 1982 | Gerhard Thiele | "For contributions to computational methods in electromagnetic theory" |
| 1983 | Sarma Maruvada | "For contributions to theoretical and experimental aspects of corona and radio interference performance of high-voltage ac and dc systems" |
| 1984 | Edmund Miller | "For contributions to the development and application of numerical methods in electromagnetic radiation and scattering" |
| 1985 | Ernest Freeman | "For leadership in developing electromagnetic compatibility models" |
| 1985 | Ryszard Struzak | "For contributions to electromagnetic compatibility instrumentation and to frequency management" |
| 1986 | Constantine A. Balanis | "For contributions to electromagnetic education, geometrical theory of diffraction, and electromagnetic geotomography" |
| 1987 | Adolf Schwab | "For contributions to the analysis and design of high-voltage and high-current measuring devices" |
| 1987 | Donald Wilton | "For contributions to numerical techniques for solving electromagnetic scattering, radiation, and penetration problems" |
| 1990 | Marcello D Amore | "For development of simulation and analysis models to evaluate transmission line corona on communication channel performance" |
| 1990 | A Howland | "For leadership in the development and production of automated microwave instrumentation systems" |
| 1990 | Katsuhiko Naito | "For contributions to research and development of high-voltage insulators" |
| 1990 | Roberto Sorrentino | "For contributions to the modeling of planar and quasi-planar structures for microwave and millimeter-wave circuits." |
| 1990 | Allen Taflove | "For contributions to the development of the finite-difference time-domain numerical solution of Maxwell's equations." |
| 1990 | Leung Tsang | "For contributions to wave propagation in discrete random media and the theory of microwave remote sensing" |
| 1990 | Jacobus Vanwyk | "For contributions to the technology of power electronic converters and associated equipment" |
| 1991 | Wolfgang Hoefer | "For contributions to the modeling and design of passive microwave and millimeter-wave circuits" |
| 1992 | Akihiro Ametani | "For contributions to the analysis of electrical transients in power systems" |
| 1992 | Robert Olsen | "For contributions to the understanding of electromagnetic fields and interference from power lines." |
| 1993 | Stephen A Sebo | "For contributions to the development of techniques for scale modeling for high-voltage transmission stations and leadership in electric power engineering education." |
| 1994 | Peter Russer | "For fundamental contributions to noise analysis and low-noise optimization of linear electronic circuits with general topology." |
| 1996 | Nader Engheta | "For contributions to the electromagnetic theory of complex media." |
| 1996 | Michel Ianoz | "For contributions to research and education in the area of transient electromagnetics with applications to lighting and EMP effects on lines and networks" |
| 1996 | Osama Mohammed | "For contributions to three-dimensional electromagnetic field computation and for the development of intelligent systems techniques for the optimal design of electromagnetic devices and systems" |
| 1997 | H Clark Bell | "For advancements in synthesis techniques and development of new prototype networks for microwave filters." |
| 1998 | Edward Kuester | "For contributions to electromagnetic wave theory and applied mathematics especially to microstrip structure, propagation along open waveguide structures and electromagnetic compatibility." |
| 1998 | James Muccioli | "For contributions to integrated circuit design practices to minimize electromagnetic interference" |
| 1998 | Michel Nakhla | "For contributions to the development of advanced CAD techniques for microwave circuits and high-speed interconnects" |
| 1998 | Istvan Novak | "For contributions to the theory and practice of radio-frequency monitoring techniques, and to the measurement and simulation of high-speed digital systems" |
| 1999 | Adel Razek | "For contributions to 3D electromagnetic field modelling and coupled phenomena analysis in electromagnetic systems." |
| 2000 | David Dixon | "For advancing shipboard EMC design through development of low frequency EMI models and the Intelligent EMC Analysis and Design System" |
| 2001 | Daniel Dezutter | "For the application of Maxwell's equations and for the development of numerical solution methods in electromagnetic scattering, antennas, and microwave circuits" |
| 2001 | Donald Pflug | "For contributions to the development and promotion of electromagnetic analysis code validation" |
| 2002 | Andrew Drozd | "For the development of knowledge-based codes for modeling and simulation of complex systems for Electromagnetic Compatibility" |
| 2002 | Allen Glisson | "For contributions to the development of numerical solution methods in electromagnetic scattering by complex surfaces." |
| 2002 | Thomas Van Doren | "For contributions to electromagnetic compatibility education" |
| 2003 | Vladimir Rakov | "For contributions to the understanding of lightning discharge phenomena" |
| 2003 | Tat Soon Yeo | "For contributions to scattering and synthetic aperture radar." |
| 2004 | Dau-chyrh Chang | "For technical leadership in antenna design and measurement systems." |
| 2004 | Nathan Ida | "For contributions to electromagnetic nondestructive testing, computational electromagnetics and engineering education." |
| 2004 | Toshio Sudo | "For contributions to high-density packaging" |
| 2005 | Koichi Ito | "For contributions to the development of antennas for mobile communications and medical applications" |
| 2005 | Branko Kolundzija | "For contributions to electromagnetic modeling of composite metallic and dielectric structures" |
| 2005 | Jin Fa Lee | "For contributions to computational electromagnetics" |
| 2005 | Qing Huo Liu | "For contributions to computational electromagnetics and to subsurface sensing applications" |
| 2005 | Perry Wilson | "For contributions to theory of electromagnetic compatibility test methods and international standards development." |
| 2006 | Todd Hubing | "For contributions to numerical electromagnetic modeling of complex printed circuit boards as applied to electromagnetic compatibility (EMC)" |
| 2006 | Heyno Garbe | "For contributions to electro magnetic compatibility (EMC) measurement techniques" |
| 2006 | John Sahalos | "For contributions to antenna analysis and design." |
| 2006 | Gianluca Setti | "For contributions to application of nonlinear dynamics to communications, signal processing, and information technology" |
| 2006 | Qijun Zhang | "For contributions to linear and nonlinear microwave modeling and circuit optimization" |
| 2007 | Flavio Canavero | "For contributions to the modeling of circuit and electronic interconnects" |
| 2007 | William Chisholm | "For contributions to extra high voltage transmission line performance assessment" |
| 2007 | James Drewniak | "For contributions in electromagnetic interference coupling paths and numerical modeling for compatibility design" |
| 2007 | Andrew Podgorski | "For contributions to broadband immunity and compatibility certification" |
| 2007 | Masamit Tokuda | "For leadership in development and international standardization of electromagnetic compatibility for telecommunication systems" |
| 2008 | Dave Giri | "For contributions to intense electromagnetic environments interacting with complex electronic systems" |
| 2008 | Jinliang He | "For contribution to lightning protection and grounding of power transmission systems" |
| 2008 | Er Li | "For contributions to electromagnetic modeling and simulation in high speed electronics" |
| 2009 | William Radasky | "For contributions to understanding high-power electromagnetic effects on electrical equipment" |
| 2009 | Jean-Pierre Berenger | "For contributions to perfectly matched layer absorbing boundary condition in computational solutions of Maxwell's equations in open regions" |
| 2009 | Ludger Klinkenbusch | "For contributions to spherical-multipole analysis of electromagnetic fields" |
| 2009 | James Knighten | "For contributions to understanding electromagnetic noise coupling paths for product compliance with regulatory standards" |
| 2009 | Timothy Maloney | "For contributions to electrostatic discharge protection of semiconductor components" |
| 2009 | Levent Sevgi | "For contributions to surface-wave radar systems" |
| 2010 | Farhad Rachidi | "For contributions to electromagnetic modeling of lightning and coupling to transmission lines" |
| 2010 | Maria Sabrina Sarto | "For contributions to advanced materials in electromagnetic compatibility applications" |
| 2010 | Motoyuki Sato | "For contributions to radar remote sensing technologies in environmental and humanitarian applications" |
| 2010 | Giuseppe Vecchi | "For the application of multi-resolution algorithms to computational electromagnetics" |
| 2011 | Andrew Marvin | "For contributions to metrology techniques for electromagnetic compatibility" |
| 2011 | Eric Mokole | "For leadership and contributions to ultra-wideband radar, waveform diversity, and transionospheric space radar" |
| 2012 | D Davidson | "For contributions to computational electromagnetics" |
| 2012 | Richard Anthony Tell | "For contributions to assessment and safety standards for human exposure to radio frequency energy" |
| 2013 | Robert Scully | "For contributions to protection of aerospace systems from lightning and electromagnetic interference" |
| 2013 | Ramachandra Achar | "For contributions to interconnect and signal integrity analysis in high-speed designs" |
| 2013 | Leonid Grcev | "For contributions to transient electromagnetic modeling of grounding systems" |
| 2013 | Ulrich Jakobus | "For leadership in hybrid computational tool development and commercialization" |
| 2013 | Kate Remley | "For contributions to calibration and measurement of wireless communication systems" |
| 2013 | Tzong-lin Wu | "For contributions to noise mitigation technologies and electromagnetic compatibility design on printed circuit boards" |
| 2014 | Brice Achkir | "For contributions to diagnostics of physical layer design in gigabit digital transmission systems" |
| 2014 | Bjørn Gustavsen | "For contributions to frequency-domain modeling techniques" |
| 2014 | Marcos Rubinstein | "For contributions to modeling lightning and its electromagnetic effects" |
| 2015 | David Pommerenke | "For contributions to system-level electrostatic discharge technology" |
| 2015 | Wiren Becker | "For contributions to power distribution and signal integrity in high-speed interconnects for computing systems" |
| 2015 | Alistair Duffy | "For development of validation methods in computational electromagnetics" |
| 2015 | Rajeev Thottappillil | "For contributions to the understanding of lightning and electromagnetic interference" |
| 2016 | Jun Fan | "For contributions to power delivery networks in printed circuit designs" |
| 2016 | Danilo Erricolo | "For contributions to electromagnetic scattering and associated computational algorithms" |
| 2016 | Tzyy-sheng Horng | "For contributions to system-in-package modeling and design" |
| 2016 | Silverio Visacro | "For contributions to lightning protection" |
| 2017 | Akimasa Hirata | "For contributions to safety assessment and standardization of human exposure to electromagnetic fields" |
| 2017 | Kenichi Kagoshima | "For contributions to antennas for satellite communication and mobile wireless access systems" |
| 2018 | Charles Bunting | "For educational contributions to electromagnetic compatibility and reverberation chambers" |
| 2018 | Stefano Grivet-talocia | "For contributions to passive macromodeling for signal and power integrity" |
| 2018 | Hideki Motoyama | "For contributions to lightning protection and insulation coordination of electric power systems" |
| 2018 | Peter Perkins | "For contributions to touch current measurement and electric shock protection" |
| 2018 | C. Reddy | "For leadership in simulation methods for antenna placement and co-site analysis" |
| 2019 | Friedhelm Caspers | "For contributions to charged particle accelerators" |
| 2019 | Lijun Jiang | "For contributions to broadband computational electromagnetic methods" |
| 2019 | Frank Leferink | "For leadership in electromagnetic compatibility measurement techniques" |
| 2019 | Shuo Wang | "For contributions to reduction of electromagnetic interference in electronic systems" |

== See also ==
- List of IEEE Fellows
