= List of fellows of IEEE Dielectrics & Electrical Insulation Society =

The Fellow grade of membership is the highest level of membership, and cannot be applied for directly by the member – instead the candidate must be nominated by others. This grade of membership is conferred by the IEEE Board of Directors in recognition of a high level of demonstrated extraordinary accomplishment.

Year	Fellow	Citation
1977	Gerhard M. Sessler	"For contributions to the field of electroacoustic transducers"
1980	Vernon Chartier	"For contributions to the understanding of corona phenomena associated with high-voltage power transmission lines"
1982	Farouk Rizk	"For contributions to the science of high-voltage technology and for technical leadership in the advancement of the electrical power industry"
1982	Ashok Vijh	"For contributions to the theory of electrochemical reactions involved in electrical and electronics products"
1983	Alan Cookson	"For contributions to the understanding of high-voltage compressed gas breakdown and the development of new higher voltage compressed gas transmission line systems"
1986	Michael Wertheimer	"For research and development of solid dielectric materials with the aid of plasma processes, and for contributions to engineering education"
1989	Raymond Boxman	"For advances in vacuum arc theory and its applications"
1990	Steinar Dale	"For contributions to gaseous dielectrics and breakdown phenomena, and testing techniques for gas insulated systems"
1990	Katsuhiko Naito	"For contributions to research and development of high-voltage insulators"
1990	J Keith Nelson	"For contributions to the field of dielectric and insulation systems"
1990	A Van Roggen	"For the theoretical and practical description of charge transport in dielectric materials"
1993	Robert Hebner	"For the development of optical and electro-optical techniques to measure the electrical behavior of dielectric liquids"
1993	Reimund Gerhard	"For contributions to the study of dielectric materials and their application in communications devices"
1993	Stephen A Sebo	"For contributions to the development of techniques for scale modeling for high-voltage transmission stations and leadership in electric power engineering education"
1993	Greg Stone	"For contributions to the development of on-line partial-discharge measuring systems for large rotating machines"
1994	Jeanp Crine	"For contributions to the theory of aging of insulation materials, and the phenomena at metal-dielectric interfaces"
1994	Harry Lenzing	"For contributions to improvement of microwave line-of-sight communications links"
1994	Toshio Suzuki	"For contributions to the reliability of substation equipment through application of insulating materials"
1994	A Zaky	"For leadership in electrical engineering education and contributions to the understanding of conduction and breakdown in dielectric liquids"
1995	Bal Gupta	"For contributions to the improved reliability of insulation systems in rotating machines through surge protection, diagnostic tests, and quality control tests"
1995	Teruyos Mizutani	"For contributions to the understanding and development of polymeric insulating materials"
1995	Howard Wintle	"For experimental and theoretical studies of charge storage and transport in electrical insulation"
1996	Aleksan Bulinski	"For contributions to the understanding of aging and breakdown processes in high voltage polymeric cable insulation"
1996	Joseph Crowley	"For contributions to education and practice in electrostatic processes, and for fundamental contributions to electrohydrodynamics"
1996	Loren Wagenaar	"For contributions to transformer and bushing test standards and specifications"
1997	Soli Bamji	"For contributions to the understanding of electroluminescence emission and aging processes in high-voltage polymeric insulation"
1997	Edward Cherney	"For leadership in research, development, application, and standardization of non-ceramic insulators and RTV silicone rubber insulator coatings"
1997	Misao Kobayashi	"For contributions to development and production of Metal Oxide Gapless Surge Arrester"
1997	Edward Sacher	"For contributions to the relationship between molecular structure and dielectric properties"
1998	Wolfgang Pfeiffer	"For achievements in the field of Ultra High Speed Diagnostics Electrical Insulation"
1999	Tatsuo Takada	"For contributions to the development of technology to measure space charge in solid and liquid dielectric materials"
1999	Arthur Yelon	"For contributions to the science and technology of ferromagnetic materials and devices, and to education in the applied sciences"
2000	Gian Carlo Montanari	"For contributions to the understanding and modeling aging processes in high voltage insulation"
2000	Yoshimichi Ohki	"For contributions to understanding of high-field and laser induced dielectric phenomena in insulating materials"
2000	Yasuo Sekii	"For contribution to understanding and development of extra-high voltage AC and DC cross-linked polyethylene insulated cable system"
2001	Ernst Gockenbach	"For contributions to the development of digital measuring and monitoring technique"
2002	Stanislaw Gubanski	"For contributions to the understanding of aging and performance of high voltage polymeric"
2003	Kenneth Bow	"For contributions to the development of polymer compounds, coated metal shielding, and laminate sheaths for wire and cable applications"
2003	James Timperley	"For contributions to diagnostic testing of rotating machinery insulation systems"
2004	Harold Kirkham	"For leadership in the field of optical measurements for power systems"
2005	John Fothergill	"For contributions to reliability methodology in the aging processes of electrical insulation systems"
2006	Roy Alexander	"For contributions to technology for capacitor bank switching and the standardization of switchgear"
2006	Masanori Hara	"For contributions to electrical insulation technology in superconducting power devices"
2007	William Chisholm	"For contributions to extra high voltage transmission line performance assessment"
2007	Masoud Farzaneh	"For leadership in the area of ice-covered insulator flashover mechanisms and development of application guidelines"
2007	Nagu Srinivas	"For contributions to assessment of vulnerability of aged extruded dielectric power cables by direct current testing"
2008	Jinliang He	"For contribution to lightning protection and grounding of power transmission systems"
2008	Shesha Jayaram	"For contributions to the use of high voltage in process technology" https://uwaterloo.ca/high-voltage-engineering-laboratory/
2008	James hompson	"For leadership in engineering education by initiating academic programs, increasing enrollment, and growing faculty and student research"
2009	Glen Bertini	"For applications to the dielectric performance of underground electrical power cable"
2009	Lucian Dascalescu	"For contributions to the modeling of electrostatic processes in the recycling and mineral processing industries"
2010	James Bowen	"For leadership in "safety by design" in electrical substation engineering"
2010	H Craig Miller	"For research on discharges and electrical insulation in vacuum"
2010	Lon W Montgomery	"For contributions to design of large synchronous generators"
2011	A Beroual	"For contributions to processes of pre-breakdown and breakdown in dielectric liquids"
2011	Sidney Lang	"For contributions to the understanding of pyroelectric and polarization phenomena in solid dielectrics"
2011	Kelly Robinson	"For contributions to electrostatic performance of manufacturing processes and imaging devices"
2012	Kunihiko Hidaka	"For contributions to measurement and electrical insulation technologies in high voltage engineering"
2012	John Albert Kay	"For contributions to arc resistant medium voltage control and protection technologies"
2012	Andreas Neuber	"For contributions to the physics of dielectric surface flashover in high electric fields"
2013	Geoffrey Stephen Klempner	"For contribution to steam turbine-driven generators"
2014	Kent Brown	"For leadership in standards development for design, testing, and utilization of electrical equipment for the nuclear power industry"
2014	Weihua Jiang	"For contributions to repetitive pulsed power generation utilizing solid-state device technology"
2014	Simon Rowland	"For contributions to the application of polymers in high voltage systems"
2015	David Pommerenke	"For contributions to system-level electrostatic discharge technology"
2015	Gary Hoffman	"For leadership in the advancement of monitoring systems for power transformers and power line protection"
2015	Safa Kasap	"For contributions to photoconductive sensors for x-ray imaging"
2016	Siegfried Bauer	"For contributions to the understanding and application of electroactive polymer dielectrics
2016	Sheldon Kennedy	"For leadership in the technology and standards for rectifier, inverter and harmonic-mitigating transformers"
2017	Hulya Kirkici	"For contributions to high frequency, high field dielectric breakdown and electrical insulation for space and aerospace power systems"
2018	Hideki Motoyama	"For contributions to lightning protection and insulation coordination of electric power systems"
2018	Peter Perkins	"For contributions to touch current measurement and electric shock protection"
2019	Tapan Saha	"For contributions to monitoring and assessment of power transformers"
2019	Syed Islam	"For contributions to wind energy conversion systems"
2019	Guangning Wu	"For contributions to traction power supply equipment diagnostics for high-speed electrified railways"

== See also ==
- List of IEEE Fellows
