= John Kay =

John Kay may refer to:

== Arts and entertainment ==
- John Kay (Poet Laureate) (14th century), English Poet Laureate of the United Kingdom
- John Caius the Elder (fl. 1480), or John Kay, poet
- John Kay (caricaturist) (1742–1826), Scottish caricaturist
- Johnny Kay (born 1940), lead guitarist for Bill Haley & His Comets from 1961 to 1967
- John Kay (musician) (born 1944), musician and lead singer of Canadian-American rock band Steppenwolf
- John Kay (poet born 1958), British poet and teacher

== Journalism ==
- John Kay (cricket journalist) (1910–1999), British cricket correspondent for The Argus
- John Kay (journalist, born 1943) (1943–2021), British journalist convicted of the manslaughter of his wife, worked on Rupert Murdoch's The Sun
- John Kay (economist) (born 1948), Scottish economist, Financial Times columnist and author
- Jon Kay (born 1969), BBC broadcast journalist

== Medicine ==
- John Walcott Kay (1890–1927), American physician

== Politics and government ==
- John Kay (MP) (1568–1624), English MP for Eye, 1610
- Sir John Kay (judge) (1943–2004), Lord Justice of the Court of Appeal of England and Wales

== Sport ==
- John Kay (Scottish footballer), Scottish footballer of the 1870s and 1880s
- John Kay (English footballer) (born 1964), English footballer

== Technology and design ==
- John Kay (flying shuttle) (1704–c. 1779), English inventor of the flying shuttle textile machinery
- John Kay (spinning frame) (18th century), English developer of the spinning frame textile machinery
- John A. Kay (1830–?), American architect in Columbia, South Carolina
- John Albert Kay, Canadian electrical engineer

== See also ==
- John Cay (1790–1865), Scottish advocate, pioneer photographer and antiquarian
- John Kaye (disambiguation)
- Jack Kay (c. 1951–2015), American academic
- John K (disambiguation)
- Jonathan Kay (born 1968), Canadian journalist
