= List of fellows of IEEE Broadcast Technology Society =

The Fellow grade of membership is the highest level of membership, and cannot be applied for directly by the member – instead the candidate must be nominated by others. This grade of membership is conferred by the IEEE Board of Directors in recognition of a high level of demonstrated extraordinary accomplishment.

Year	Fellow	Citation
2006	Ulrich Reimers	For contributions to the development of Digital Video Broadcasting (DVB)
2007	Fadhel M. Ghannouchi	For contributions to advanced microwave amplification circuits and sub-systems
2007	David James Skellern	For contributions to high speed devices and systems for wireless and wireline communications networks
2008	Jinyun Zhang	For contributions to broadband wireless transmission and networking technology
2012	Wenjun Zhang	For contributions to digital television systems and standards

== See also ==
- List of IEEE Fellows
