= List of fellows of IEEE Components, Packaging & Manufacturing Technology Society =

The Fellow grade of membership is the highest level of membership, and cannot be applied for directly by the member – instead the candidate must be nominated by others. This grade of membership is conferred by the IEEE Board of Directors in recognition of a high level of demonstrated extraordinary accomplishment.

Year	Fellow	Citation
2005	Duane Boning	For contributions to modeling and control in semiconductor manufacturing
2003	Sreejit Chakravarty	For contributions to high volume manufacturing testing of VLSI circuits
2014	Manuel Dabreu	For contributions to the design of resilient manufacturing processes for electronic products
2010	Andrew Kahng	For contributions to the design for manufacturability of integrated circuits, and the technology roadmap of semiconductors
2017	Frank Liu	For contributions to design for manufacturability of VLSI circuits
2006	Gary May	For contributions to semiconductor manufacturing and engineering education
2014	Zhigang Pan	For contributions to design for manufacturability in integrated circuits
2017	William Regli	For contributions to 3D search, design repositories and intelligent manufacturing
1997	W Trybula	For contributions in developing and advancing electronics manufacturing technology

== See also ==
- List of IEEE Fellows
