= David Irwin =

David Irwin may refer to:

- David Irwin (explorer) (1910–1970), American arctic sled explorer
- David Irwin (rugby union) (born 1959), Irish rugby union player
- Dave Irwin (born 1954), Canadian skier
- J. David Irwin (born 1939), engineer

== See also ==
- David Irving (disambiguation)
- David Irvine (disambiguation)
