= Kate Remley =

American radio metrologist

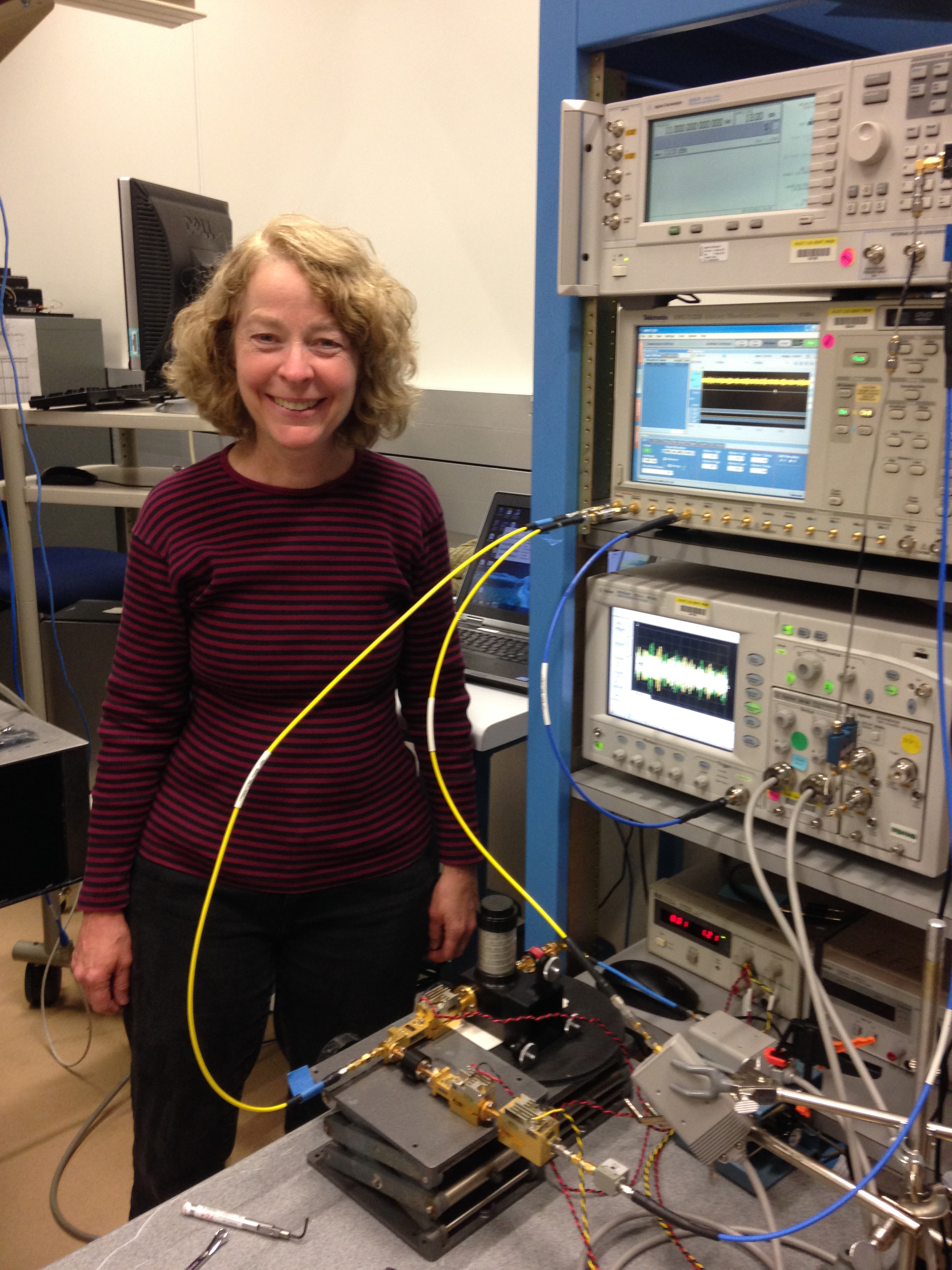
Remley with a 94 GHz calibrated signal source, 2014

Catherine A. Remley is an American radio metrologist in the Communications Technology Laboratory of the National Institute of Standards and Technology, where she heads the Metrology for Wireless Systems Group.

== Education and career ==
Remley is originally from Ann Arbor, Michigan. She became a radio broadcast engineer in Eugene, Oregon from 1983 to 1992. Returning to graduate study, she completed a Ph.D. in electrical and computer engineering from Oregon State University in 1999. Her dissertation, Time domain modeling of electromagnetic radiation with application to ultrafast electronic and wireless communication, was supervised by Andreas Weisshaar.

In the same year she joined the National Institute of Standards and Technology in Boulder, Colorado. She became leader of Metrology for Wireless Systems at NIST in 2003.

She was editor-in-chief of IEEE Microwave Magazine from 2009 to 2011.

== Recognition ==
Remley was named to the Academy of Distinguished Engineers of the Oregon State University College of Engineering in 2011. In 2013, she was elected as an IEEE Fellow, "for contributions to calibration and measurement of wireless communication systems". She was a Distinguished Lecturer of the IEEE Electromagnetic Compatibility Society for 2016 to 2018.

She is a recipient of the Department of Commerce Bronze Medal and Department of Commerce Silver Medal. In 2019, she and Nada Golmie were given NIST's William P. Schlichter Award, "for their leadership of the NIST 5G mmWave Channel Model Alliance".

Throughout her career, she has made over 60 publications. One that she did by herself is called "Let's Keep Women in Microwaves (But Let's Turn Down the Heat)"
