= Stephanie G. Adams =

American engineer and academic administrator

- Education: North Carolina A&T State University; University of Virginia; Texas A&M University
- Scientific career
- Fields: Systems engineering, engineering education
- Workplaces: University of Nebraska–Lincoln; National Science Foundation; Virginia Commonwealth University; Old Dominion University; University of Texas at Dallas
- Doctoral advisor: Karan L. Watson

Stephanie Glenn Adams was born in Norfolk, Virginia on August 30th, 1965. She is an American engineer and academic administrator, serving as the dean of the Erik Jonsson School of Engineering and Computer Science at the University of Texas at Dallas since 2019. She was president of the American Society for Engineering Education from 2019 to 2020. Adams served as dean of the Old Dominion University Batten College of Engineering and Technology from 2016 to 2019.

== Education ==
Adams earned a B.S., cum laude, in mechanical engineering from the North Carolina A&T State University in 1989. She completed a M.E. in systems engineering from the University of Virginia in 1991. Adams received a Ph.D. in interdisciplinary engineering from Texas A&M University in 1998. Her dissertation was titled An Investigation of the Attributes Contributing to Team Effectiveness of Engineering and Science Faculty. Karan L. Watson was her doctoral advisor.

== Career ==
Adams joined the faculty of the University of Nebraska–Lincoln in 1998 as an assistant professor of industrial and management systems engineering. In 2003, she won a National Science Foundation CAREER Award. She also won the 2017 WEPAN Founders Award. Adams was promoted to associate professor in 2004. She held various administrative positions including special assistant to the dean of graduate studies, interim associate dean of graduate studies, assistant dean for research in the college of engineering and associate dean for undergraduate education. Adams was an American Association for the Advancement of Science engineering policy fellow and program director at the National Science Foundation from August 2005 to August 2007.

Adams was an associate professor of mechanical engineering at the Virginia Commonwealth University from 2008 to 2011, where she also served as the associate dean for undergraduate studies. She joined Virginia Tech in 2011 as a professor and head of engineering education. In 2016, she joined Old Dominion University as the dean of its Batten College of Engineering and Technology. In 2018, Adams was appointed as the president-elect of the American Society for Engineering Education. In 2019, she became a professor of systems engineering and the Lars Magnus Ericsson Chair in Electrical Engineering at the University of Texas at Dallas. She is dean of its Erik Jonsson School of Engineering and Computer Science. She specializes in research to improve the organization and educational efficacy of her department while also supporting an increase in the interests of marginalized groups in engineering.
