= Klempner =

Klempner (German for "tinker") is a surname. Notable people with the surname include:

- Geoffrey Stephen Klempner, Canadian engineer
- Mark Klempner (1956–2019), folklorist, oral historian and social commentator
