= Pommerenke =

Pommerenke is a surname. Notable people with the surname include:

- Christian Pommerenke (1933–2024), Danish mathematician
- David Pommerenke, American engineer
- Heinrich Pommerenke (1937–2008), German serial killer
- Jürgen Pommerenke (born 1953), German football midfielder and manager
