= IEEE Undergraduate Teaching Award =

Education award

- Awarded for: To honor teachers of electrical and electronics engineering and the related disciplines.
- Presented by: IEEE
- Rewards: The award consists of a bronze medal, certificate, and honorarium.
- First award: 1992
- Website: IEEE Undergraduate Teaching Award

The IEEE Undergraduate Teaching Award is a Technical Field Award of the IEEE that was established by the IEEE Board of Directors in 1990. It is presented for inspirational teaching of undergraduate students in the fields of interest of the IEEE.

This award may be given to an individual only.

Recipients of this award receive a bronze medal, certificate, and honorarium.

== Recipients ==
The recipients of the IEEE Undergraduate Teaching Award include the following people:

- 2027: Rhonda R. Franklin
- 2026: Laleh Behjat
- 2025: Carlos Calderón Córdova
- 2024: R. Iris Bahar
- 2023: Carlotta A. Berry
- 2022: Christopher Rose
- 2021: Cristine Agra Pimentel
- 2020: Rajesh Kannan Megalingam
- 2019: Lisa Gresham Huettel
- 2018: Susan Lord
- 2017: Bonnie Heck Ferri
- 2016: Terri Fiez
- 2015: Branislav M. Notaros
- 2014: Hsi-Tseng Chou
- 2013: Charles Kenneth Alexander
- 2012: Santosh K. Kurinec
- 2011: Raghunath Shevgaonkar
- 2010: Ned Mohan
- 2009: John C. Bean
- 2008: Muhammad Harunur Rashid
- 2007: Clayton R. Paul
- 2006: John B. Peatman
- 2005: Yannis Tsividis
- 2004: Richard C. Jaeger
- 2003: Mehrdad Ehsani
- 2002: No Award
- 2001: No Award
- 2000: Haniph A. Lachman
- 1999: Michael G. Pecht
- 1998: J. David Irwin
- 1997: Chand R. Viswanathan
- 1996: Karan L. Watson
- 1996: David A. Patterson
- 1995: David G. Meyer
- 1994: N. Narayana Rao
- 1993: Ronald G. Hoelzeman
- 1992: James W. Nilsson
