= Ghannouchi =

Ghannouchi is a Tunisian surname. Notable people with the surname include:

- Fadhel M. Ghannouchi (born 1958), Tunisian electrical engineer
- Mohamed Ghannouchi (born 1941), former Prime Minister of Tunisia
- Rached Ghannouchi (born 1941), Tunisian politician and thinker
