= List of fellows of IEEE Consumer Electronics Society =

The Fellow grade of membership of the Institute of Electrical and Electronics Engineers (IEEE) is the highest level of membership, and cannot be applied for directly by the member – instead the candidate must be nominated by others. This grade of membership is conferred by the IEEE Board of Directors in recognition of a high level of demonstrated extraordinary accomplishment.

Year	Fellow	Citation
1974	Arch Luther	For engineering contributions to the design of color television cameras and video tape recorders
1981	Robert Meyer	For contributions to analysis and design of high-frequency amplifiers
1983	H Troy Nagle	For contributions to industrial electronics, data acquisition, and control instrumentation
1987	Paul Liao	For contributions to nonlinear optics and laser spectroscopy
1988	Walter Ciciora	For contributions in the development of standards for the consumer electronics and cable industry.
1988	Robert Glorioso	For leadership in the development of high-performance minicomputers.
1990	Kees Immink	For contributions to optical laser recording and compact disk digital audio systems
1991	Clark Johnson	For contributions to both the theory and application of photoelectrons, image conversion, and electron multiplication
1994	Shinichi Makino	For leadership in the research and development of multipath signal suppression techniques employed in television equipment.
1994	Yasuo Takemura	For contributions to color television camera technologies
1995	Fumitaka Ono	For contributions to the research and development of Markov source coding, and arithmetic codes and applications
1996	Wayne Luplow	For leadership in establishing then terrestrial broadcast system of digital high definition for North America
1997	Edward Delp	For contributions to image compression and processing
1997	Kou-hu Tzou	For contributions and leadership to the technology of progressive image transmission and video compression technology
1998	Marilyn Wolf	For contributions to Hardware/Software Co-Design
1999	Frederick Mintzer	For contributions to the development of digital libraries, digital watermarking, and multirate signal processing
1999	Said El-khamy	For contributions to signaling techniques for propagation through natural media
1999	Stuart Lipoff	For contributions leading to commercialization of advanced consumer electronics products
2000	Soo-chang Pei	For contributions to the development of digital eigenfilter design, color image coding and signal compression, and to electrical engineering education in Taiwan
2001	Patrick Mantey	For leadership in engineering education, in research and in academic-industrial-government projects
2001	Yiyan Wu	For contributions to digital television research and standards development
2002	Stephen Dukes	For leadership in evolving cable television industry architecture, technology and standards for rapidly developing digital two-way communications systems
2002	Shuji Hirakawa	For contributions to the innovation of coded-modulation and set-partitioning, and applications of error-correcting codes to a real digital broadcasting system
2003	Wai-chi Fang	For contributions to VLSI systems using neural-based methods
2003	Masaru Sakurai	For contributions to digital signal processing technology in HDTV systems
2004	Hou Chaohuan	For technical leadership in advancing VLSI system technology
2004	J Farmer	For technical leadership in the cable television industry
2006	Karlheinz Brandenburg	For contributions to audio coding
2006	William Chen	For contributions to packaging and assembly technology
2006	Ulrich Reimers	For contributions to the development of Digital Video Broadcasting (DVB)
2006	John Sahalos	For contributions to antenna analysis and design
2006	Gary Sullivan	For contributions to video coding and its standardization
2007	Peter H De With	For contributions to compression techniques and architecture of television and recording systems
2008	Ikuo Awai	For contributions to microwave passive components
2008	Manuel Castro	For contributions to distance learning in electrical and computer engineering education
2008	Tomlinson Holman	For contributions to the recording of cinema sound and its realistic reproduction in both cinema and home environments
2008	Nam Ling	For contributions to video coding algorithms and architectures
2009	Leslie Baxter	For contributions to high-speed digital communication networks
2009	Nicholas Economou	For leadership in developing and commercializing focused ion beam systems
2010	Peter Corcoran	For contributions to digital camera technologies
2010	Uwe Kraus	For contributions to digital television signal compression and transmission
2010	Richard Prodan	For leadership in the development of high definition television and broadband networks
2011	Robert Frankston	For contributions to the first electronic spreadsheet and home networking
2011	Akihiko Sugiyama	For contributions to speech and audio signal processing
2011	Anthony Vetro	For contributions to video coding, three-dimensional television, and multimedia adaptation
2012	Nasser Kehtarnavaz	For contributions to real-time and biomedical image processing
2012	Sung Jea Ko	For contributions to digital camera technologies
2012	Robert Sherratt	For contributions to embedded signal processing in consumer electronic devices and products
2012	Wan Chi Siu	For leadership in signal processing and contributions to video technologies
2013	Branislav Djokic	For contributions to precision metrology in electrical power applications
2013	L Dennis Shapiro	For leadership in development and commercialization of personal emergency response systems
2014	Rahul Dixit	For leadership in microwave monolithic integrated circuits technologies and in active electronically steerable arrays application
2014	John Schneider	For leadership in advancing the field of ultrasonic imaging and fingerprint identification
2015	Joseph Decuir	For contributions to computer graphics and video games
2015	Detlev Marpe	For contributions to video coding research and standardization
2016	Hitoshi Kiya	For contributions to filter structure, data hiding, and multimedia security
2016	Mark Laubach	For leadership in design and standardization of cable modems
2016	Richard Nute	For contributions to safety engineering of electrical and electronic products
2017	Michael Isnardi	For contributions to compliance testing and vision-based video compression technologies
2017	Panos Nasiopoulos	For leadership in DVD authoring and digital multimedia technologies
2017	Xianbin Wang	For contributions to OFDM systems and distributed transmission technologies
2017	Dianguo Xu	For contribution to control of electrical drives and power electronic converters
2017	Ce Zhu	For contributions to video coding and communications
2018	Thomas Coughlin	For leadership in consumer electronics digital storage technology
2018	Kohtaro Asai	For contributions to video coding development and standardization
2019	Wen-chung Kao	For leadership in the development of electrophoretic display technology
2019	Danilo Pau	For contributions to the development of memory efficient architectures for advanced multimedia applications
2019	Seishi Takamura	For application of video coding
2024	Hoi-Kwong Lo	For contributions to the theory and practice of quantum cryptography
2024	Steve Mann	For contributions to wearable and immersive computing technologies

== See also ==
- List of IEEE Fellows
