= Kunihiko Hidaka =

Kunihiko Hidaka from The University of Tokyo, Tokyo, Japan was named Fellow of the Institute of Electrical and Electronics Engineers (IEEE) in 2012 for contributions to measurement and electrical insulation technologies in high voltage engineering.
