= S. C. Dutta Roy =

Indian engineer

- Born: 1 November 1937 (age 88); Mymensingh, Bengal, British India
- Education: Rajabazar Science College; University of Calcutta
- Known for: Studies on analog and digital signal processing
- Awards: 1973 IETE Meghnad Saha Award of the IETE; 1980 IETE Ram Lal Wadhwa Gold Medal; 1981 Shanti Swarup Bhatnagar Prize; 1981 PRL Vikram Sarabhai Research Award; 1987 Om Prakash Bhasin Award; 1992 INSA Syed Hussain Zaheer Medal; 2010 SSI Lifetime Achievement Award; 2015 IETE Lifetime Achievement Award; Jawaharlal Nehru Award; UoC-IRPE Distinguished Alumnus Award
- Scientific career
- Fields: Circuit systems; Signal processing
- Workplaces: River Research Institute; University of Kalyani; University of Minnesota; IIT Delhi; University of Leeds; Iowa State University

Suhash Chandra Dutta Roy (born 1937) is an Indian electrical engineer and a former professor and head of the department of electrical engineering at the Indian Institute of Technology, Delhi. He is known for his studies on analog and digital signal processing and is an elected fellow of all the three major Indian science academies viz. Indian Academy of Sciences, Indian National Science Academy, National Academy of Sciences, India as well as the Institute of Electrical and Electronics Engineers, Institution of Electronics and Telecommunication Engineers, Systems Society of India and Acoustical Society of India, The Council of Scientific and Industrial Research, the apex agency of the Government of India for scientific research, awarded him the Shanti Swarup Bhatnagar Prize for Science and Technology, one of the highest Indian science awards for his contributions to Engineering Sciences in 1981. (Note: Long link - please select award year to see details)

== Biography ==
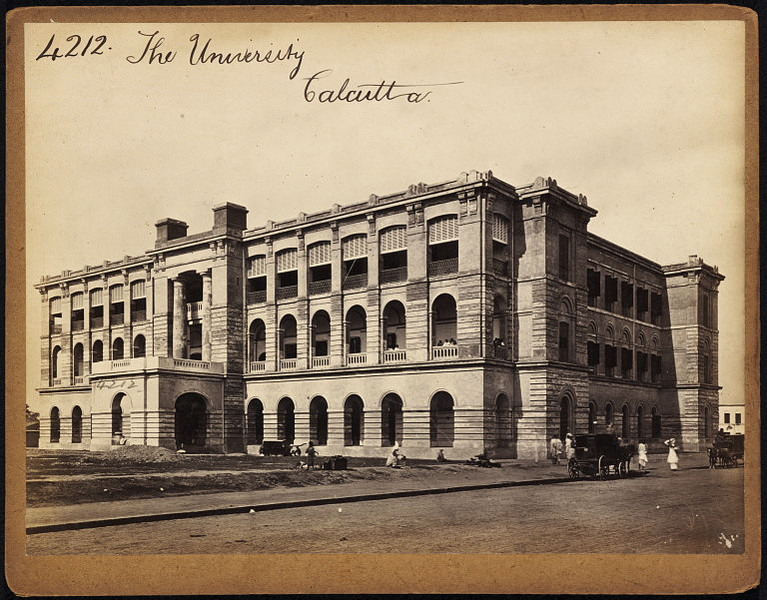
Calcutta University - a 19th-century photograph by Francis Frith.

S. C. Dutta Roy, born on 1 November 1937 at Mymensingh in the Bengal region of the British India (presently in Bangladesh) to Suresh Chandra Roy and Suruchi Bala, did his college studies at the University of Calcutta. After graduating in physics with honors in 1956, he completed a master's degree in engineering (MTech) in 1959 at the Institute of Radio Physics and Electronics and enrolled for his doctoral studies at Calcutta University Rajabazar Science College. During his doctoral studies, he worked as a research officer at River Research Institute during 1960–61 and as a lecturer of physics at Kalyani University from 1962. It was during his service at Kalyani University, he received the degree of DPhil in radio physics and electronics in 1965. The same year, he moved to the US for his post-doctoral work and served as an assistant professor at the University of Minnesota till 1968. Returning to India, he joined the Indian Institute of Technology, Delhi in September 1968 as an associate professor of electrical engineering and served the institution for more than thirty years.

Starting his career at IIT Delhi in 1968 as associate professor, Dutta Roy served in various positions as a professor (1970–98), head of the department of electrical engineering (1970–73) and a dean of undergraduate studies (1983–86) till his regular superannuation from service in 1998. In between, he took two sabbaticals, the first during 1973–74 to serve as a visiting professor at University of Leeds and the other, as a visiting fellow at Iowa State University during 1978–79. Post-retirement, he served as an emeritus fellow during 1998–2004, as an INSA senior scientist during 2004–07 and as an INSA honorary science from 2007, all at IIT Delhi till 2010. Since then, he serves as an honorary scientist of the Indian National Science Academy.

Dutta Roy is married to Mala Choudhury.They have one son Amaltash.

== Career ==
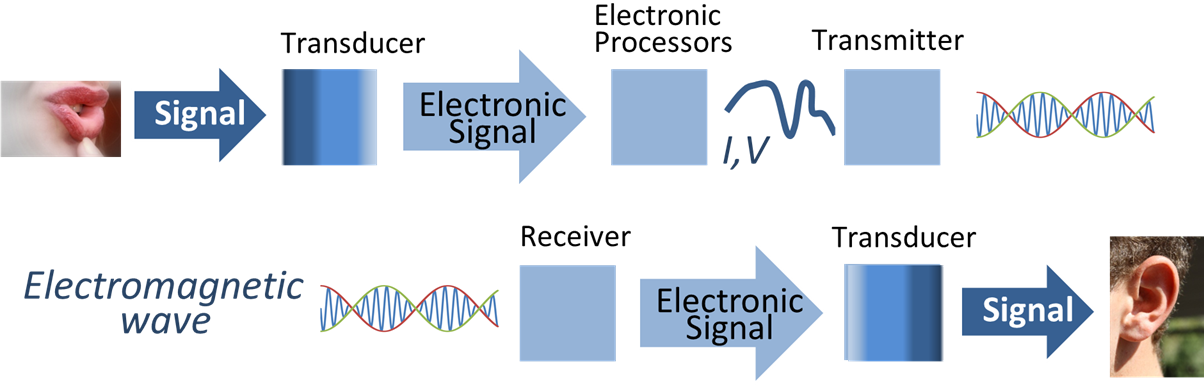
Signal processing system

Dutta Roy's principal areas of studies have been network synthesis, solid state circuits, distributed networking and signal processing and he is known to have done extensive researches on digital and analog signal processing. He focused on network studies during his doctoral days but shifted focus to RC circuit after he moved to Minnesota, particularly economic inductor simulation and low sensitivity circuits. It was during this period, he developed a method for calculating sensitivity in active and passive filters and introduced a network synthetic approach to variable frequency oscillators. From the seventies, his work was mainly on digital and analog signal processing. He holds three Indian patents for his work, and his researches have also assisted others in their work. His researches have been documented in several peer-reviewed articles; (Note: Please see Selected articles section) and ResearchGate, an online repository of scientific articles, has listed 306 of them. Besides, he has contributed chapters to three books, including the Volume 10 (Signal Processing and its Applications) of the Handbook of Statistics published by Elsevier and his work has been cited by many authors. He has also guided thirty doctoral scholars in their studies.

Dutta Roy has designed and authored video courses covering five semesters which are being promoted by National Programme on Technology Enhanced Learning, the e-learning platform of the Ministry of Human Resource Development, through their online learning platform. He has been associated with several government agencies as well as a number of international science journals such as International Journal of Circuit Theory and Applications, and Circuits and Systems journal. He was the guest editor for Issue 5 volume 34 of the Journal of Research of the Institution of Electronics and Telecommunication Engineers. He served as a member of the administrative council of the Indian National Science Academy in 2009 and is a member of the National Advisory Committee of Institute of Radio Physics and Electronics of the University of Calcutta. He has delivered invited or keynote speeches at many international seminars and conferences, the 54th Annual Meeting of Indian Association for the Cultivation of Science in 1989 and the 2013 International Conference on Signal Processing and Communication (ICSC 2013) organized by the Jaypee Institute of Information Technology featuring among them.

== Awards and honors ==
Dutta Roy received the Meghnad Saha Award and the Ram Lal Wadhwa Gold Medal, both Institution of Electronics and Telecommunication Engineers (IETE) honors, in 1973 and 1980 respectively. IETE would honor him again in 2015 with the Lifetime Achievement Award. In between, the Council of Scientific and Industrial Research awarded him the Shanti Swarup Bhatnagar Prize, one of the highest Indian science awards in 1981, the same year as he received the Vikram Sarabhai Research Award of the Physical Research Laboratory, followed by Om Prakash Bhasin Award in 1987 and Syed Hussain Zaheer Medal of the Indian National Science Academy in 1992. He received the Lifetime Achievement Award of the Systems Society of India in 2010. He is also a recipient of the Jawaharlal Nehru Award and the Distinguished Alumnus Award of the Institute of Radio Physics and Electronics, Calcutta University.

Dutta Roy, who is a former National Lecturer of the University Grants Commission of India, was elected as a fellow by the Indian National Science Academy in 1983 and he became a fellow of the Indian National Academy of Engineering in 1987. The Indian Academy of Sciences made him their elected fellow in 1988, followed by the National Academy of Sciences, India in 1990. In 1995, the Institution of Electronics and Telecommunication Engineers (IETE) made him a distinguished fellow of the institution. He is also an elected fellow of the Acoustical Society of India and Systems Society of India. The Indian Institute of Engineering Science and Technology, Shibpur awarded him the degree of Doctor of Science (Honoris Causa) in March 2016. The award orations delivered by Dutta Roy include 2009 Dr. Guru Prasad Chatterjee Memorial Lecture the Indian National Science Academy.

== Bibliography ==
=== Chapters ===
- Dutta Roy, S. C.; Kumar, B. (21 November 2007). Bose, N. K.; Rao, C. (eds.). Handbook of Statistics: Signal Processing and its Applications. Vol. 10. Elsevier. p. 832. ISBN 978-0-08-055421-1.
- Dutta Roy, S. C. (30 December 2015). "Glimpses from a Lifetime in Teaching and Research". In Ghosh, Purnendu; Raj, Baldev (eds.). The Mind of an Engineer. Springer. pp. 79–94. ISBN 978-981-10-0119-2.

=== Selected articles ===
- Suhash Chandra Dutta Roy, Balbir Kumar, Shail Bala Jain (December 2001). "Fir Notch Filter Design (A Review)". Facta Universitatis. 14 (3): 295–327.
- M.R.R. Reddy, S.C. Dutta Roy, B. Kumar (August 2002). "Design of efficient second and higher degree FIR digital differentiators for midband frequencies". IEE Proceedings G - Circuits, Devices and Systems. 138 (1): 29–33. doi:10.1049/ip-g-2.1991.0006.
- Jayadeva, S.C. Dutta Roy, A. Chaudhary (August 2002). "Compact analogue neural network: a new paradigm for neural based combinatorial optimisation". IEE Proceedings - Circuits, Devices and Systems. 146 (3): 111–116. doi:10.1049/ip-cds:19990314 (inactive 12 July 2025).
- Suhash C. Dutta Roy (May 2005). "A simple derivation of the spectral transformations for IIR filters". IEEE Transactions on Education. 48 (2): 274–278. Bibcode:2005ITEdu..48..274D. doi:10.1109/TE.2004.842913. S2CID 21505583.
- S.C. Dutta Roy (June 2005). "Rational approximation of some irrational functions through a flexible continued fraction expansion". Proceedings of the IEEE. 70 (1): 84–85. doi:10.1109/PROC.1982.12233.
- G.G. Anderson, S.C. Dutta Roy (July 2007). "Improving the transient-response characteristics of pulse filters with parabolic distribution of poles". Electronics Letters. 4 (9): 173–174. doi:10.1049/el:19680131.
- S.C. Dutta Roy (May 2008). "On the Design of the Triple-Resonance Interstage Network". IEEE Transactions on Circuits and Systems II: Express Briefs. 55 (9): 863–866. Bibcode:2008ITCSE..55..863R. doi:10.1109/TCSII.2008.923416. S2CID 207877326.
- Sheel Aditya, S. C. Dutta Roy (June 2008). "Comments on "Reduced-length rat-race couplers"". IEEE Transactions on Microwave Theory and Techniques. 56 (6): 1501. Bibcode:2008ITMTT..56.1501A. doi:10.1109/TMTT.2008.923865.
- Suhash C. Dutta Roy (November 2010). "Some Little-Known Facts About Transmission Lines and Some New Results". IEEE Transactions on Education. 53 (4): 556–561. Bibcode:2010ITEdu..53..556D. doi:10.1109/TE.2009.2033040. S2CID 19933378.
- Suhash Chandra Dutta Roy (2017). "A New Lumped Element Bridged-T Absorptive Band-stop Filter". Facta Universitatis. 30 (2): 179–185. doi:10.2298/FUEE1702179D.

=== Selected video lecture series ===
- S.C.Dutta Roy (27 April 2008). Lecture - 1 Review of Signals and Systems (YouTube video). Lecture Series on Circuit Theory. New Delhi: National Programme on Technology Enhanced Learning.
- S.C.Dutta Roy (28 April 2008). Lecture - 2 Review of Signals and Systems (YouTube video). Lecture Series on Circuit Theory. New Delhi: National Programme on Technology Enhanced Learning.
- S.C.Dutta Roy (28 April 2008). Lecture - 3 Network Equations; Initial and Final Conditions (YouTube video). Lecture Series on Circuit Theory. New Delhi: National Programme on Technology Enhanced Learning.
- S.C.Dutta Roy (28 April 2008). Lecture - 4 Problem Session1 (YouTube video). Lecture Series on Circuit Theory. New Delhi: National Programme on Technology Enhanced Learning.
- S.C.Dutta Roy (28 April 2008). Lecture - 5 Step, Impulse and Complete Responses (YouTube video). Lecture Series on Circuit Theory. New Delhi: National Programme on Technology Enhanced Learning.
- S.C.Dutta Roy (28 April 2008). Lecture - 6 2nd Order Circuits:Magnetically Coupled Circuits (YouTube video). Lecture Series on Circuit Theory. New Delhi: National Programme on Technology Enhanced Learning.
- S.C.Dutta Roy (28 April 2008). Lecture - 7 Transformer Transform Domain Analysis (YouTube video). Lecture Series on Circuit Theory. New Delhi: National Programme on Technology Enhanced Learning.

== See also ==
- Digital signal processing
- Analog signal processing
