= Manuel Dabreu =

American electrical engineer

Manuel Dabreu is an electrical engineer with the SanDisk Corporation in El Dorado Hills, California.

Dabreu was named a Fellow of the Institute of Electrical and Electronics Engineers (IEEE) in 2014 for his contributions to the design of resilient manufacturing processes for electronic products.
