= Manoj Sachdev =

Canadian engineer

Manoj Sachdev from the University of Waterloo, Waterloo, ON, Canada was named Fellow of the Institute of Electrical and Electronics Engineers (IEEE) in 2012 for contributions to test methodology for very large scale integrated circuits.
