= R. Iris Bahar =

Professor at the school of engineering, Brown University

R. Iris Bahar is Department Head of Computer Science at the Colorado School of Mines. Previously, she was professor at the School of Engineering at Brown University. Her interests include computer architecture; computer-aided design for synthesis, verification and low-power applications; and design, test, and reliability issues for nanoscale systems.

== Education and career ==
She earned the B.S. (1986) and M.S. (1987) degrees in computer engineering from the University of Illinois Urbana-Champaign. After that she worked at the Digital Equipment Corporation. After that she joined the Ph.D. program in and earned the Ph.D. degree in electrical and computer engineering from the University of Colorado Boulder (1995), with the dissertation "Methods for Timing Analysis and Logic Synthesis to Decrease Power Dissipation".

Since 1996 she is with Brown University, becoming full professor in 2012. In 2022, she joined Colorado School of Mines as the Department Head of Computer Science.

== Awards and recognition ==
- 2024: IEEE Undergraduate Teaching Award, "for innovative undergraduate teaching and transformative student mentoring that champion inclusivity in engineering and examine societal impacts of technology".
- 2022: IEEE Fellow "for contributions to modeling and design of power-aware and noise-tolerant nanoscale computing systems"
- 2019: Marie R. Pistilli Women in Engineering Achievement Award "for outstanding technical contributions in energy efficient and reliable electronic systems, nanoelectronics, and nanotechnology"
- National Science Foundation CAREER award
- Distinguished Scientist of the ACM
