= Duane Boning =

Electrical Engineer

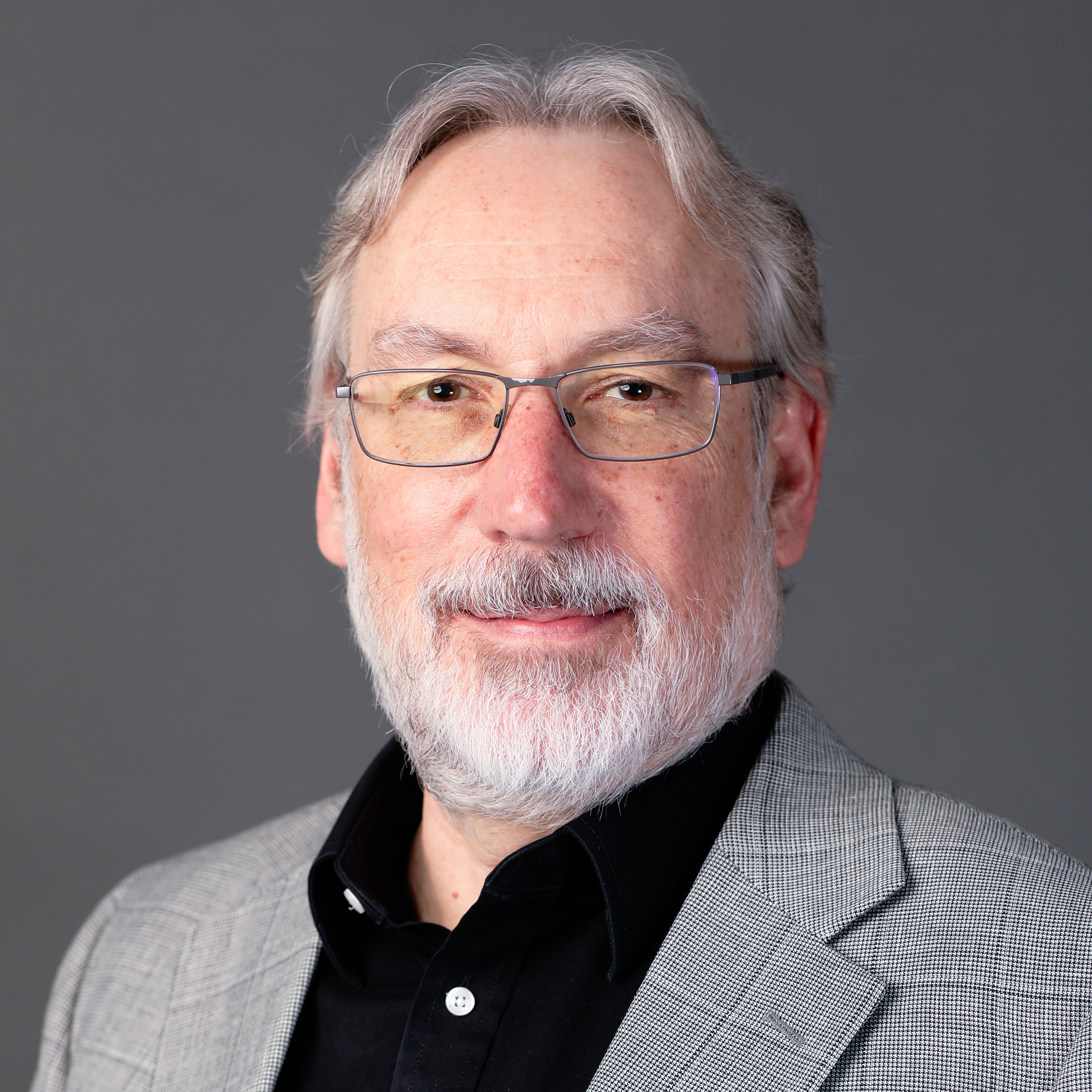
Duane Boning in 2025

Duane S. Boning, the Clarence J. LeBel Professor in Electrical Engineering, and Professor of Electrical Engineering and Computer Science (EECS) at MIT was named a Fellow of the Institute of Electrical and Electronics Engineers (IEEE) in 2005 for his contributions to the modeling and control in semiconductor manufacturing.
