= Rhonda Franklin =

Professor of Electrical and Computer Engineering

- Born: 1965 (age 60–61)
- Education: University of Michigan, M.S., Ph.D. Texas A&M University, B.S.
- Scientific career
- Workplaces: University of Minnesota
- Doctoral advisor: Linda Katehi

Rhonda Rene Franklin (born 1965) is a professor of electrical and computer engineering at the University of Minnesota. She is a microwave and radio frequency engineer whose research focuses on microelectronic mechanical structures in radio and microwave applications. She has won several awards, including the 1998 NSF Presidential Early Career Award for Scientists and Engineers, the 2013 Sara Evans Leadership Award, the 2017 John Tate Award for Excellence in Undergraduate Advising, and the 2018 Minnesota African American Heritage Calendar Award for her contributions to higher education.

== Education ==
Franklin was born in Rayne, Louisiana and grew up in Shreveport and Houston, Texas. During high school, she received mixed advice on the career she should pursue. While her senior counselor thought she should become a secretary, her science teachers encouraged her to explore STEM fields by attending a summer camp run by the National Science Foundation. This exposure to science inspired Franklin to pursue and complete her bachelor's degree in Electronic Engineering at Texas A&M University in 1988. She joined University of Michigan for her graduate studies, earning a Master's in 1990 and her PhD in 1995. Her supervisor was Linda Katehi. She was the first African American woman in the microwave engineering program, and one of only six African-Americans graduating with engineering Ph.D.s in the United States in 1995. Her graduate research was sponsored by the National GEM Consortium and involved three placements at Lawrence Livermore National Laboratory.

== Awards ==
- 1998 Presidential Early Career Award for Scientists and Engineers (PECASE)
- 2002 NAE 8th Annual Symposium on Frontiers in Engineering
- 2003 NAE 6th Annual German-American Frontiers of Engineering (GAFOE) Symposium
- 2003 3M Non-tenured Faculty Award
- 2006 NAE 9th Annual German-American Frontiers of Engineering (GAFOE) Symposium
- 2012 CIC Academic Leadership Fellow (University of Minnesota)
- 2012 and 2013 U of Minnesota Morse Alumni Teaching Award Finalist (University of Minnesota)
- 2014 Sara Evans Faculty Scholar/Leader Award, (University of Minnesota)
- 2017 John Tate Advising Award (University of Minnesota)
- 2018 Minnesota African American Heritage Calendar Award
- 2018 Willie Hobbs Moore Distinguished Alumni Lecturer (University of Michigan ECE Department)
- 2019 N. Walter Cox Service Award (IEEE Microwave Theory and Techniques Society)
- 2020 IEM Abbott Professorship in Innovative Education
- 2023 ECE Distinguished Alumni Educator Award at the University of Michigan
- 2026 IEEE Fellow
- 2027 IEEE Undergraduate Teaching Award

== Research and career ==
Franklin researches radio-frequency microwave circuits. She identifies new ways to integrate communication devices. She was an instructor at the University of Illinois at Chicago in 1996, and joined the University of Minnesota's Department of Electrical and Computer Engineering faculty in 1998. She was awarded the Presidential Early Career Award for Scientists and Engineers (PECASE) by Bill Clinton in 1998.

Her research areas include:

- Biomedical and Biological Computational Methods Devices, and System
- Fields, Photonics, Magnetic Recording Technology
- Micro and Nanostructures

Her recent research combines high-speed antennas and circuits for biomedical applications, such as cancer diagnostics.

Franklin was the first woman to earn tenure in her department as an assistant professor, and also is the first African-American woman to do so in both her department and the entire college.

In 2007 she was appointed chair of the scholarship program, and worked to promote microwave-engineering education to minority students. In 2012 she was named a CIC Academic Leadership Fellow. In 2013 she was promoted to Professor. She won the 2014 Sara Evans Award for her research success in wireless communications. She won the 2016 John Tate Award for Excellence in Undergraduate Advising from the University of Minnesota, and was the recipient of the 2019 N. Walter Cox Award of the IEEE Microwave Theory and Techniques Society for exemplary service "in a spirit of selfless dedication and cooperation."

Franklin instituted the Microwave Packaging and Technology (MPACT) research group at the University of Minnesota.

In 2020, Franklin along with Chris Purnell received the inaugural IEM Abbott Professorships in Innovative Education. The Professorships were awarded to the co-directors of The Institute for Engineering in Medicine (IEM) at the University of Minnesota. The award is intended to help advance IEM's mission to inspire students in eighth grade through junior college to see themselves in STEM careers in biomedicine and healthcare delivery.

In 2023, she returned to the University of Michigan to receive the CE Distinguished Alumni Educator Award. This was in recognition of her contributions to engineering education.

=== Public engagement and diversity work ===
Franklin co-founded the Institute of Electrical and Electronics Engineers Microwave Theory and Techniques Society's (IEEE MTT-S) International Microwave Symposium (IMS) Project Connect, which connects underrepresented undergraduate college students to opportunities in microwave engineering, a field in STEM. She works with her co-founders, Tom Weller (now at Oregon State University) and Rashaunda Henderson (UT Dallas), and other committed industry and government colleagues who volunteer from the MTT-S society to create and host this immersive program to broaden participation of women and minorities annually within the IMS conference of the IEEE MTT-S professional society since 2014. Project Connect selects students based on academic credentials and offers both professional development opportunities and technical training. Through the University of Michigan "Next Prof" program, Franklin has been a mentor to several early career scientists. She uses educational technology to provide access for students from minority groups.
