= Jinyun Zhang =

Electrical engineer

- Born: China
- Education: Tsinghua University; University of Ottawa
- Children: Lan Yang
- Engineering career
- Discipline: Electrical engineering
- Institutions: Tsinghua University; Nortel; Mitsubishi Electric Research Laboratories
- Employer: Mitsubishi Electric Research Laboratories
- Projects: Wireless networks, sensor networks, ultra-wideband networks, multi-hop routing, network broadcasting
- Significant advance: Contributions to broadband wireless transmission and networking technology
- Awards: IEEE Fellow (2008); Fellow of Mitsubishi Electric Research Laboratories

Jinyun Zhang is an electrical engineer whose work has included wireless networks, sensor networks, ultra-wideband networks, multi-hop routing, and network broadcasting. Originally from China, she was a doctoral student in Canada and works in the US, as a vice president and director at Mitsubishi Electric Research Laboratories in Cambridge, Massachusetts.

== Education and career ==
Zhang has a bachelor's degree in radio electronics from Tsinghua University in China, and taught as a lecturer at Tsinghua University until 1985. She went to the University of Ottawa in Canada for doctoral study in electrical engineering, and completed her Ph.D. there in 1991.

Next, she worked for ten years in Canada at Nortel. She moved from there to the US and to Mitsubishi Electric Research Laboratories in 2001.

== Recognition ==
Zhang was named an IEEE Fellow in 2008, as a member of the IEEE Communications Society, "for contributions to broadband wireless transmission and networking technology". She is also a Fellow of the Mitsubishi Electric Research Laboratories.

== Personal life ==
Zhang has a daughter, Lan Yang, who also studied electrical engineering at the University of Ottawa, earning a master's degree there in 2005.
