= Richard Anthony Tell =

Richard Anthony Tell is a physicist at Richard Tell Associates, Inc. in Madison, Alabama, United States. He was named a Fellow of the Institute of Electrical and Electronics Engineers (IEEE) in 2012 for his contributions to the assessment of, and safety standards for, human exposure to radio frequency energy.

Tell attended Midwestern State University for his undergraduate degree, finishing with a BS in physics and mathematics in 1966. He went on for an MS in radiation sciences at Rutgers University, which he completed in 1967.

Working for the United States government, first at the Center for Devices and Radiological Health and later at the Environmental Protection Agency, Tell helped develop safety standards for exposure to radiofrequency fields.
