= Susan Lord =

Susan M. Lord is an American electrical engineer and educator. She is a professor and Chair of the Department of Integrated Engineering at the University of San Diego (USD), where she focuses on engineering education and diversity in STEM. She was named a Fellow of the Institute of Electrical and Electronics Engineers (IEEE) in 2015 for her "professional leadership and contributions to engineering education." She is also a Fellow of the American Society for Engineering Education (ASEE).

Lord earned her Bachelor of Science in Electrical Engineering and Materials Science from Cornell University and her Master of Science and Ph.D. in Electrical Engineering from Stanford University. Prior to joining USD, she held a faculty position at Bucknell University and has worked at institutions including AT&T Bell Laboratories, NASA Goddard Space Flight Center, and SPAWAR Systems Center. She also served as a visiting professor at Southeast University in Nanjing, China, in 2012.

Her research has been supported by the National Science Foundation (NSF) and focuses on student pathways in engineering, with particular attention to underrepresented groups such as Latinos, military veterans, and women in STEM fields. She has co-authored several publications in engineering education and received best paper awards from the Journal of Engineering Education and the IEEE Transactions on Education.

Lord served as president of the IEEE Education Society from 2009 to 2010 and has been an associate editor for leading journals in engineering education. In 2020, she received the IEEE Undergraduate Teaching Award.

== Awards ==
- 2020: IEEE Undergraduate Teaching Award
