= Laleh Behjat =

Canadian professor in engineering

Laleh Behjat is a professor at the Department of Electrical and Software Engineering at the University of Calgary in Alberta, Canada.

== Biography ==
Behjat completed a bachelor's degree in engineering at the University of Tehran in 1996 and immigrated from Iran to Canada in 1997. She received her master's degree in Electrical Engineering in 1999 and her PhD in 2002 from University of Waterloo. In 2002 she was appointed a professor in electrical and computer engineering at the University of Calgary.

Her research mainly focuses on developing various electronic design automation (EDA) techniques for physical design, large scale optimisation for EDA, as well as engineering education. Behjat is the NSERC Chair for Women in Science and Engineering (Prairies Region) where she works on developing inclusive culture in the STEM fields. The Chairs for Women in Science and Engineering (CWSE) is NSERC's initiative responding to the need for diversity and inclusion within the STEM fields.

In 2009, she and her colleagues received seed funding to find ways to promote engineering and science for women. Behjat aims to narrow the gender gap between female and male engineers.

== Recognitions ==
In 2015, Behjat received the Women in Engineering and Geoscience Award from APEGA in recognition of her work in the area of promoting gender diversity.

She is a fellow of the Canadian Academy of Engineering.

She received the 2026 IEEE Undergraduate Teaching Award, "for leadership in bringing creativity, experiential learning experiences, and inclusive design to engineering courses".
