= John Osepchuk =

American microwave engineer (1927–2024)

- Born: John Moses Osepchuk; February 11, 1927; Peabody, Massachusetts, U.S.
- Died: November 28, 2024 (aged 97); Concord, Massachusetts, U.S.
- Education: Harvard University
- Occupation: Microwave engineer
- Spouse: Shirley Greenwood Small (m. 1956; died. 2011)

John Moses Osepchuk (February 11, 1927 – November 28, 2024) was an American microwave engineer.

== Life and career ==
Osepchuk was born in Peabody, Massachusetts, the son of Moses, a tailor, and Mary Osepchuk. He was trained as a radio operator in the United States Army's Specialized Training Program. After his discharge, he attended Harvard University, earning his BA degree in 1949, his MA degree in 1950 and his PhD degree in engineering in 1957.

In 1978, Osepchuk was named a fellow of the Institute of Electrical and Electronics Engineers, "for contributions to microwave technology and to microwave safety". He worked as a liaison engineer at Raytheon until 1995.

== Personal life and death ==
In 1956, Osepchuk married Shirley Greenwood Small. Their marriage lasted until her death in 2011.

Osepchuk died in Concord, Massachusetts on November 28, 2024, at the age of 97.
