= Nada Golmie =

American computer scientist and engineer

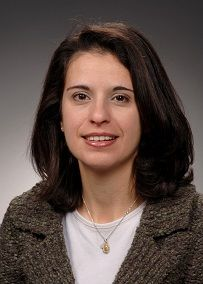
- Education: University of Maryland, College Park (PhD)
- Scientific career
- Fields: Computer science, engineering
- Workplaces: National Institute of Standards and Technology
- Thesis: Coexistence of Bluetooth and 802.11 networks (2002)
- Doctoral advisor: A. Udaya Shankar

Nada Taleb Golmie is an American computer scientist and engineer. She is chief of the wireless networks division in the Communications Technology Laboratory at the National Institute of Standards and Technology.

== Career and education ==
Golmie joined the National Institute of Standards and Technology (NIST) in 1993 as a research engineer. She completed a Ph.D. in computer science at University of Maryland, College Park. Her 2002 thesis was titled Coexistence of Bluetooth and 802.11 networks. Golmie's doctoral advisor was A. Udaya Shankar. Golmie is the chief of the wireless networks division in the NIST Communications Technology Laboratory. Her research in media access control and protocols for wireless networks led to over 200 technical papers presented at professional conferences, journals, and contributed to international standard organizations and industry led consortia. Golmie is a member of the NIST Public Safety Communication Research program and leads the efforts on the simulation modeling and evaluation of LTE in support of public safety communications. She leads several projects related to the modeling and evaluation of future generation wireless systems and protocols and serves as a co-chair for the 5G mmWave Channel Model Alliance.

== Recognition ==
Golmie was elected as an IEEE Fellow in 2022, "for contributions to wireless technologies and standards".

In November 2024, Dr. Golmie received the Presidential Rank Award, one of the most prestigious honors for career members of the Senior Executive Service (SES) and senior career employees in the United States.

== Selected works ==
- Golmie, Nada (2006). Coexistence in wireless networks challenges and system-level solutions in the unlicensed bands. Cambridge University Press. ISBN 9786610703456. OCLC 1058509325.
