= David Irvine =

David Irvine may refer to:

- David Irvine (blackjack player) (born 1970), engineer and professional blackjack player
- David Irvine (Canadian politician) (1835–1924), Irish-born farmer and political figure in New Brunswick, Canada
- David Irvine (diplomat) (1947–2022), Director-General of ASIO

== See also ==
- David Ervine (1953–2007), Northern Irish unionist politician
- David Irving (disambiguation)
- David Irwin (disambiguation)
