= Sundaram Ramesh =

American electrical engineer

Sundaram Ramesh is an engineer at California State University, Northridge, California. He was named a Fellow of the Institute of Electrical and Electronics Engineers (IEEE) in 2015 for his contributions to entrepreneurship in engineering education.
