= John K =

John K may refer to:

- John Kricfalusi, Canadian animator and voice-actor
- John K (musician), American singer

== See also ==
- John Kay (disambiguation)
- John Kaye (disambiguation)
