= Hulya Kirkici =

Turkish-American electrical engineer

Hulya Kirkici is a Turkish-American electrical engineer whose research interests span a wide range of topics including insulators for aerospace applications, pulsed power, the use of advanced materials in plasma switches and vacuum electronics, pulsed plasma, and beam shaping for lasers and lidar. She is professor and chair of the Electrical and Computer Engineering Department at the University of South Alabama.

== Education and career ==
Kirkici was a physics student at Middle East Technical University in Ankara, where she earned a bachelor's degree in 1981 and a master's degree in 1984. She went to the Weber Research Institute of Polytechnic University in New York (now part of New York University) for doctoral study in electrical engineering; she completed her PhD in 1990 with the dissertation Electronic Energy Transfer Lasers.

After postdoctoral research at the Weber Research Institute and at the Space Power Institute of Auburn University, she joined Auburn as an assistant professor of electrical and computer engineering in 1993. She was tenured as an associate professor in 1998 and promoted to full professor in 2011. In 2016, she moved to her present position at the University of South Alabama.

She served as president of the Dielectrics and Electrical Insulation Society of the IEEE for 2009–2010.

== Recognition ==
The IEEE gave Kirkici the Sol Schneider Award "for continuing technical and administrative leadership in the power modulator and high voltage communities" in 2010, and the William G. Dunbar Award "for continuing contribution to high-voltage and high frequency insulation research and engineering education" in 2014. She was the 2015 recipient of the IEEE Dielectrics and Electrical Insulation Society's Eric O. Forster Distinguished Service Award.

She was elected as an IEEE Fellow in 2017, "for contributions to high frequency, high field dielectric breakdown and electrical insulation for space and aerospace power systems".
