= Silverio Visacro =

Brazilian Engineer

Silverio Visacro is an engineer at the Universidade Federal de Minas Gerais (UFMG) in Belo Horizonte, Brazil. He was named a Fellow of the Institute of Electrical and Electronics Engineers (IEEE) in 2016 for his contributions to lightning protection.
