= John Kaye =

John Kaye or Jonathan Kaye may refer to:

- John Kaye (screenwriter) (born 1941), American screenwriter and novelist
- John Kaye (politician) (1955–2016), Australian politician
- John Kaye (footballer) (born 1940), English former footballer and manager
- John Kaye (bishop) (1783–1853), English bishop and academic
- Sir John Lister Kaye, 1st Baronet (1772–1827), MCC cricketer
- John William Kaye (1814–1876), British military historian
- John Brayshaw Kaye (1841–1909), English-born American poet, lawyer and politician
- Sir John Lister Kaye, 4th Baronet (1697–1752), British landowner and politician
- Jonathan Kaye (born 1970), American golfer
- Jonathan Kaye, first owner of the restaurant Prezzo
- Jonathan Kaye (linguist) (born 1942), American linguist

== See also ==
- John Lister-Kaye (born 1946), English conservationist, author, 8th baronet
- John Kay (disambiguation)
- John K (disambiguation)
