= Rajeev Thottappillil =

Swedish researcher

Rajeev Thottappillil is a Professor in Electric Power Engineering and Design at KTH Royal Institute of Technology, Stockholm, Sweden. He was named Fellow of the Institute of Electrical and Electronics Engineers (IEEE) in 2015 for contributions to the understanding of lightning and electromagnetic interference.

Thottappillil obtained his Ph.D. degree in electrical engineering from the University of Florida in Gainesville in 1992 and until 1995 served there as postdoctoral research fellow. In 1996, he became an associate professor at the High Voltage Research Institute of Uppsala University in Sweden and from 2000 to 2008 served as professor of its Division for Electricity.
