= John Kay (poet born 1958) =

British poet and teacher (born 1958)

- Born: 5 April 1958 (age 68); Bury, Lancashire
- Occupations: poet, Visual artist,
- Writing career
- Period: 1980–present
- Website: www.johnkaypoet.co.uk

John Kay (born 5 April 1958) is a British poet and visual artistwho is currently living in Bournemouth, Dorset.

== Poetry competitions ==
Kay has taken part in many poetry competitions, including:

- EFL Poetry Competition 1999 (1st)
- Middlesex Full Circle Competition 1999 (1st)
- Chiltern Writer’s Competition 2000 (1st)
- SEAL Open Poetry Competition 2003 (1st)
- Poole Poetry Slam 2004 (2nd)
- Ottaker’s/Faber Poetry Competition 2004 (1st)
- Partners 21st Open Poetry Competition 2006 (Highly Commended)
- Long-listed, Bridport Poetry Prize 2006
- 2007, Virginia Warby Poetry Prize 2006 (3rd)
- Long-listed, Bridport Poetry Prize
- Short-listed, Dreich Chapbooks 2023

== Magazines and publications ==
During 2020 and into 2021 John Kay was a regular contributor to Pat Sissons' lunchtime radio programme on BBC Radio Solent, where he had over 40 poems broadcast. His most recent poetry collection (2019) is entitled 'She Stole My Northern Heart', published by A Million Ways Press. It has received great reviews and I believe a signed copy can be obtained from his website at 'johnkaypoet.co.uk' Kay has been published in A Million Ways and been involved with a number of other publications; these include Poet in Profile, South 35, 2007, Interpreter’s House, South, Doors, Poetry File 'The Frogmore Papers', 'Ink, Sweat and Tears' ‘Smoke’and his local newspaper, the Bournemouth Daily Echo. His first collection of verse, 'It Wouldn't Do' was published in 2008. His most recent collection 'She stole my northern heart' was published in 2019 by A Million Ways. He has performed at the Increase the Peace Festival, Arts By The Sea, Bournemouth and The Harmony Conference, Bournemouth University.

== Performance ==
Kay has been actively involved with a number of readings locally and further afield, these include among others:

- Christchurch Poetry Festival 2002
- Wimborne Poetry Festival 2002
- Word and Action, Dorset 2002
- Poetry Café NPS, London 2002
- Glenmoor School 2003
- Wimborne Library 2003
- National Poetry Day/Russel-Cotes Museum, Bournemouth, 2003
- Poole Poetry Slam 2004
- Wessex Poetry Festival 2004
- National Poetry Day/Russel-Cotes Museum, Bournemouth, 2004
- National Poetry Day/Russel-Cotes Museum, Bournemouth, 2005
- Ferndown Upper School, 2006
- South, Waterstones, Southampton, 2006
- South, Bournemouth University, 2007
- Reading with Malcolm Povey Bournemouth University 2007
- Sounds 07 Festival, Kingston Lacy House, Wimborne, 2007
- Poetry Reading at 'All Fired Up' Cafe in Bournemouth, 2008
- John Peel's 7oth Birthday Bash, Kazimeer Gardens, Liverpool 2009
- Poetry Cafe, Southampton, 2018
- South Reading with James Manlow, Southampton 2018
- Increase the Peace 2021 - 2022
- South Reading Bournemouth Library 2023
- Harmony Conference, Bournemouth, 2023
- Arts By The Sea Festival, Bournemouth, 2023
- Tangerine Cafe, Beaminster, March 2024
