= David Irving (disambiguation) =

David Irving (born 1938) is a British Holocaust denier and writer.

David Irving may also refer to:

- David Irving (director) (born 1949), American film director, screenwriter, author, and professor
- David Irving (librarian) (1778–1860), Scottish biographer
- David Irving (footballer) (born 1951), English former football player
- David Irving (bishop), Bishop of Saskatoon
- David P. Irving (1841–1922), farmer and political figure in Prince Edward Island, Canada
- Dan Irving (1854–1924), David Daniel Irving, British member of parliament
- David Irving (American football) (born 1993), NFL defensive lineman

== See also ==
- David Irvine (disambiguation)
- David Irwin (disambiguation)
