= Danilo Erricolo =

Italian-American engineer

Danilo Erricolo, an Italian-American engineer from the University of Illinois at Chicago was named Fellow of the Institute of Electrical and Electronics Engineers (IEEE) in 2016 for contributions to electromagnetic scattering and associated computational algorithms and also the current Editor-in-Chief of IEEE Transactions on Antennas and Propagation.
