= Edmund Strudwick =

American physician

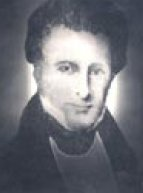
Edmund Strudwick

Edmund Charles Fox Strudwick (born March 25, 1802) at Long Meadows, north of Hillsborough, in Orange County, North Carolina. He eventually designed the first building at Dorothea Dix mental hospital (then called the State Hospital for the Insane) in 1848, where he also was chosen as the first "Physician and Superintendent," a temporary position he held until 1853. He was also instrumental in the founding of the medical school at the University of North Carolina, and was elected the North Carolina Medical Society's first president April 17, 1849.

His early education was at Hillsborough's Bingham School. After his father, William Strudwick, died in 1810, Dr. James Webb became his guardian. Strudwick was listed as a "transient member" of the Dialectic Society of the University of North Carolina in 1823, and graduated as a doctor of medicine from the University of Pennsylvania in 1824. After graduation, he served for two years as a resident physician at the Philadelphia Almshouse and Hospital.

He returned to Hillsborough, North Carolina, in 1826 or 1827, and in 1828, married Ann E. Nash, with whom he had five children with (two of them—daughters—died in infancy). One of the children was Frederick N. Strudwick (1833-1890) who was the leader of the Orange County Ku Klux Klan and wrote the articles of impeachment for North Carolina's first republican Governor William W. Holden (1818-1892) who was elected with the aid of the Freeman vote. In the 1860s, Edmund Strudwick was the doctor for the Hillsborough Military Academy in Hillsborough, and also cared for soldiers wounded in the Civil War at his home nearby. He also was an elder in Hillsborough Presbyterian Church.

He died at age 77 on November 29, 1879, from an accidental ingestion of atropine. He is buried in the Hillsborough Old Town Cemetery.
