= North Carolina Polytechnic Academy =

Historic house in North Carolina, United States

- Commandant's House
- U.S. National Register of Historic Places
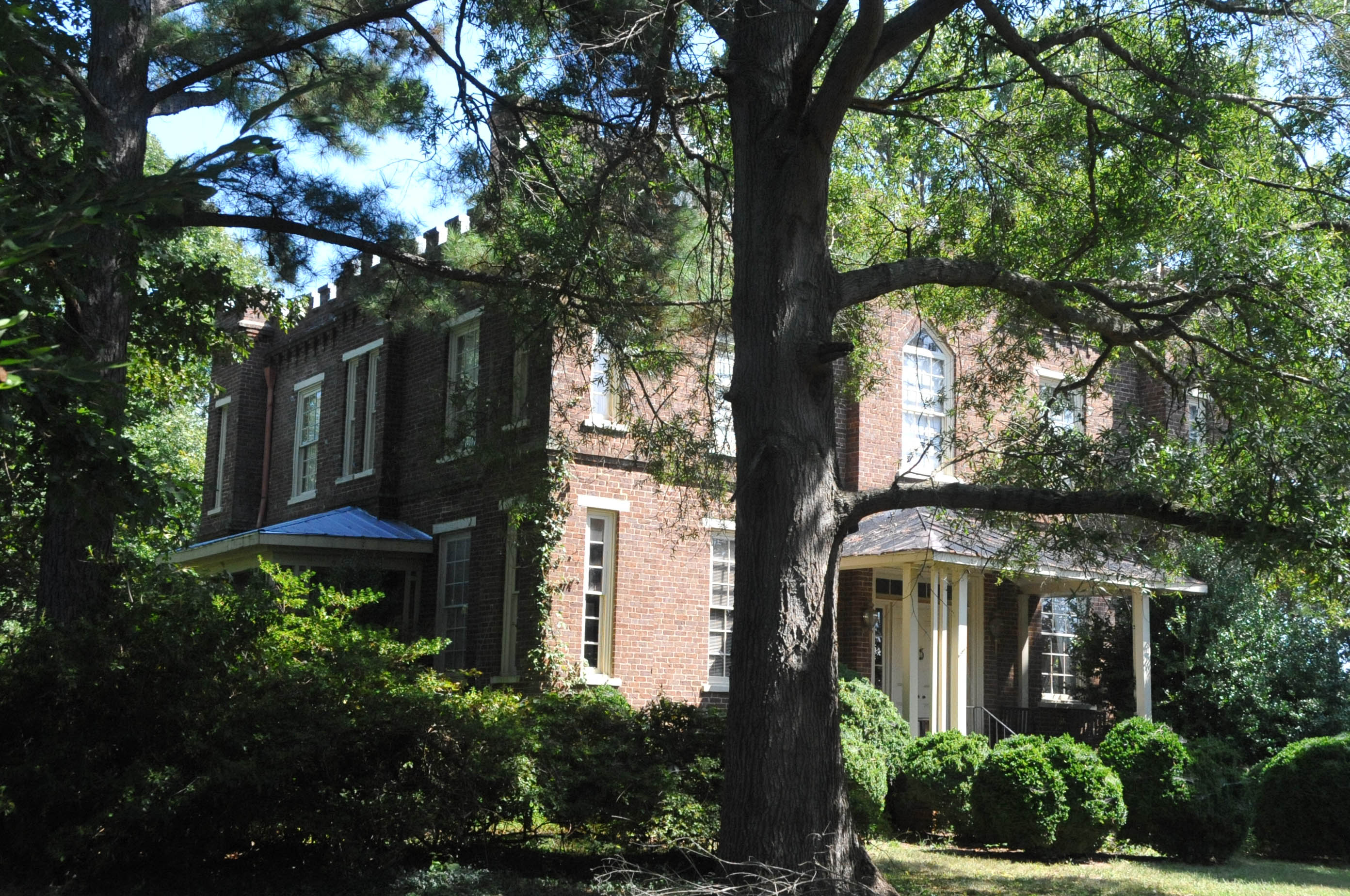
- Commandant's House, March 2007

- Location within North Carolina Location within the United States
- Location: Barracks Rd., Hillsborough, North Carolina
- Coordinates: 36°4′19″N 79°7′22″W
- Area: 2 acres (0.81 ha)
- Built: c. 1860
- Architectural style: Gothic Revival, Gothic Revival Castellated
- NRHP reference No.: 72000981
- Added to NRHP: November 9, 1972

North Carolina Polytechnic Academy, founded as Hillsborough Military Academy and also known as North Carolina Military Academy, was a school in Hillsborough, North Carolina. Col. Charles C. Tew CSA founded Hillsborough Military Academy. He was later killed in action at Battle of Antietam in 1862 on the eve of his promotion to brigadier general. Architect John A. Kay designed the Hillsborough Military Academy barracks building and commandant's house. Edmund Strudwick was the doctor for the Hillsborough Military Academy in the 1860s and cared for soldiers wounded in the Civil War at his home nearby.

The commandant's house is a two-story, roughly square, castellated brick building in the Gothic Revival style. It is three bays wide and three bays deep and has rectangular turrets at each corner.

After the war the school was run by Colonel White and then General Raleigh E. Colston. The curriculum was revised in 1867 to include civil courses. The North Carolina state legislature changed the name to the North Carolina Military and Polytechnic Academy and established a program in which eight students could attend the school free of charge in return for two years of teaching in the state. This last reincarnation of the Military Academy was a failure and General Colston relocated to Wilmington, North Carolina in 1868.

In 1872 Paul C. Cameron purchased the Academy buildings and in 1874 convinced James H. Horner of the Horner Military Academy and Ralph H. Graves of the Graves School in Oxford, North Carolina to "remove to the Military Academy buildings". The new school also failed two years later due to the illness of Horner and the death of Graves.

The Cameron family sold the property to the Farmers’ Alliance in 1895 and it was sold to a developer in 1919. The barracks and outbuildings were dismantled and the bricks used the construction of other buildings. The headquarters building became part of the National Register of Historic Places in 1972 and became a private residence known as the "Commandant’s House" while the academy's chapel remains in use as a parish of The United Episcopal Church of North America.
