= Charles C. Tew =

Confederate States Army officer (1827–1862)

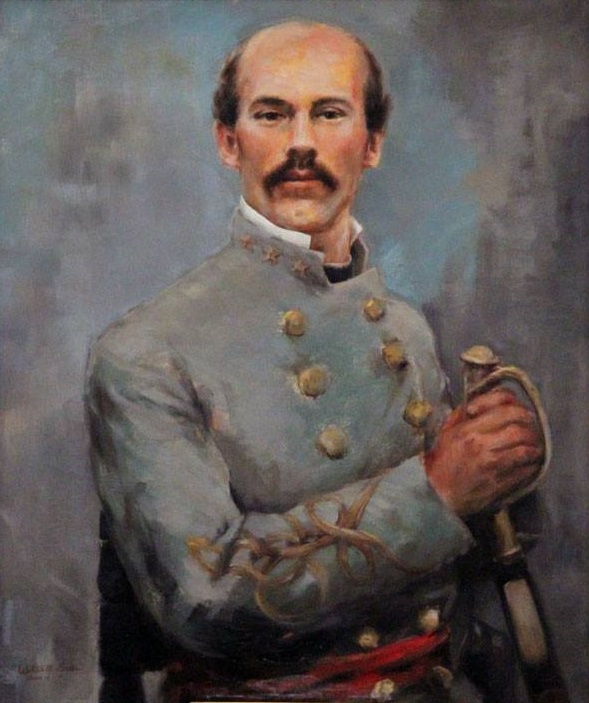
- Charles Courtenay Tew
- Born: October 17, 1827; Charleston, South Carolina
- Died: September 17, 1862 (aged 34); Sharpsburg, Maryland
- Burial place: Unknown
- Military career
- Allegiance: Confederate States of America
- Branch: Confederate States Army
- Service years: 1861–62
- Rank: Colonel
- Commands: 2nd North Carolina State Troops, infantry regiment
- Conflicts: American Civil War: Peninsula Campaign; Northern Virginia Campaign; Maryland Campaign; Battle of Antietam †

Charles Courtenay Tew (October 17, 1827 – September 17, 1862) was a colonel in the Confederate States Army and was killed in action at the Battle of Antietam during the American Civil War.

== Early life ==
Tew was born in Charleston, South Carolina to Henry Slade Tew and Caroline Courtenay. Tew's paternal ancestry was French Huguenot and his maternal grandfather was a native of Ireland.

Tew was one of twenty cadets initially admitted to the new South Carolina Military Academy in 1843, now known as The Citadel. Tew graduated first in his class in 1846, becoming both the first graduate of the school and the first honor graduate. Upon graduation, he took a position as a professor at the Citadel Academy until 1852, when he then traveled to Europe for a year and studied military tactics. After returning from Europe he was made Commandant of Cadets, in 1857 was appointed superintendent of the Arsenal Academy in Columbia, SC, the SCMAs 'second campus'. In 1859 Tew founded the Hillsborough Military Academy in Hillsborough, North Carolina.

== Civil War ==
When North Carolina seceded, the first two colonels appointed by Governor John Willis Ellis were Tew and D.H. Hill. Tew was commissioned to the 2nd North Carolina State Troops, which, during the Peninsula Campaign was attached to the brigade of Brig. Gen. George B. Anderson in the Army of Northern Virginia. Tew took part in the Peninsula Campaign, the Northern Virginia Campaign, and the Maryland Campaign. Tew was killed-in-action at the Battle of Antietam on September 17, 1862, while leading his regiment Google, the 2nd North Carolina State Troops.

=== Antietam ===
During the mid-day portion of the Battle of Antietam at the Sunken Road, Tew took command of Anderson's brigade after Anderson fell mortally wounded. Tew was speaking with Col. John B. Gordon of the 6th Alabama Infantry Regiment on the Sunken Road (the famed Bloody Lane) along the Confederate line when both men were struck. Gordon later wrote -

"The first volley from the Union lines in my front sent a ball through the brain of the chivalric Colonel Tew, of North Carolina, to whom I was talking, and another ball through the calf of my right leg. On the right and the left my men were falling under the death-dealing crossfire like trees in a hurricane...."

Capt. Matthew Manly of Company D, 2nd North Carolina wrote -

"During the battle in this bloody lane Colonel Charles Courtenay Tew was killed, his body falling into the hands of the enemy . . . . He was shot through the head and placed in the sunken road . . . Here he was found, apparently unconscious, the blood streaming from a wound in the head, with his sword held in both hands across his knees. A Federal soldier attempted to take the sword from him, but he drew it toward his body with his last remaining strength, and then his grasp relaxed and he fell forward, dead."

Tew was shot through both temples, but evidently did not die immediately. His body was ostensibly pulled down into the Sunken Road after he was struck. When the Confederates were forced to retreat from the Sunken Road, Tew's body was never identified or recovered.

== Tew's fate and legacy ==
Many conflicting stories and rumors were spread concerning Tew's fate. A prominent one was that Tew was alive and a prisoner of war at Fort Jefferson in the Dry Tortugas. Tew's father went to Washington and received permission to visit the prison but he was unable to locate him. His place of burial remains unknown. In October 1874, a Union veteran, Capt. J. W. Bean, sent a silver cup, which had been taken from Tew's body, to Tew's father. Bean's letter also informed Tew's father that he had buried Tew on the field. Tew's sword (presented by the cadets of The Arsenal, the Columbia, SC campus of the SCMA, and inscribed with his name) and his watch were never returned to his family.

A photograph taken by Alexander Gardner was believed to contain an image of Tew's body. The photograph, often called "Dead at Bloody Lane" shows a Confederate officer in the bottom right of the photo, lying on his back against the bank of the Sunken Road. Further research confirmed that picture was taken from a point further up the hill and not near the intersection of Bloody lane and the Roulette Farm lane which is where Tew was killed.

Recently The Citadel, The Military College of South Carolina announced that the Tew Sword had been identified by the Canadian Army unit 33 Signal Regiment of Ottawa, Ontario, and would be returned to the school on Friday, September 18, 2015 prior to a Dress Parade by the Corps of Cadets. The exchange took place in a ceremony at 1:30pm, 16 Sept 2015, at the spot Col Tew fell on The Bloody Lane.
