= John Kay (Poet Laureate) =

English poet

John Kay was a fifteenth-century English poet who described himself as the versificator regis (which would develop into the position of Poet Laureate of the United Kingdom) to Edward IV of England. If it ever existed, none of his poetic work remains.
