= John A. Kay =

American architect

John A. Kay was one of the primary architects in the building of the South Carolina State House, in Columbia, South Carolina, in the mid-19th century.

Kay was born in England in 1830. In the early 1850s, he married Mary E. Hewitson, the sister of his business partner, Ralph E.B. Hewiston.

By 1854, he was living in Columbia, South Carolina, and was a master Mason in Richland Lodge #39. He became involved with the construction of the South Carolina State House in 1854, first as Peter H. Hammarskold's project superintendent, and later as assistant architect under George E. Walker. He also co-authored a report on the construction of the structure with engineer John R. Niernsee. In 1859, Kay designed the Hillsborough Military Academy barracks building and commandant's house, in Hillsborough, North Carolina.

At the beginning of the Civil War, Kay enlisted in the Confederate military's Richland Rifles, serving as an engineer. He served as a non-commissioned officer during the campaign to capture Fort Sumter in April 1861.

After the end of the war, he again became involved with the continued construction of the South Carolina State House, which was damaged in the shelling and subsequent burning of Columbia.

In August 1869, he moved to St. Charles, Missouri. His date and place of death are currently unknown.
