= River Research Institute =

Research institute in Bangladesh

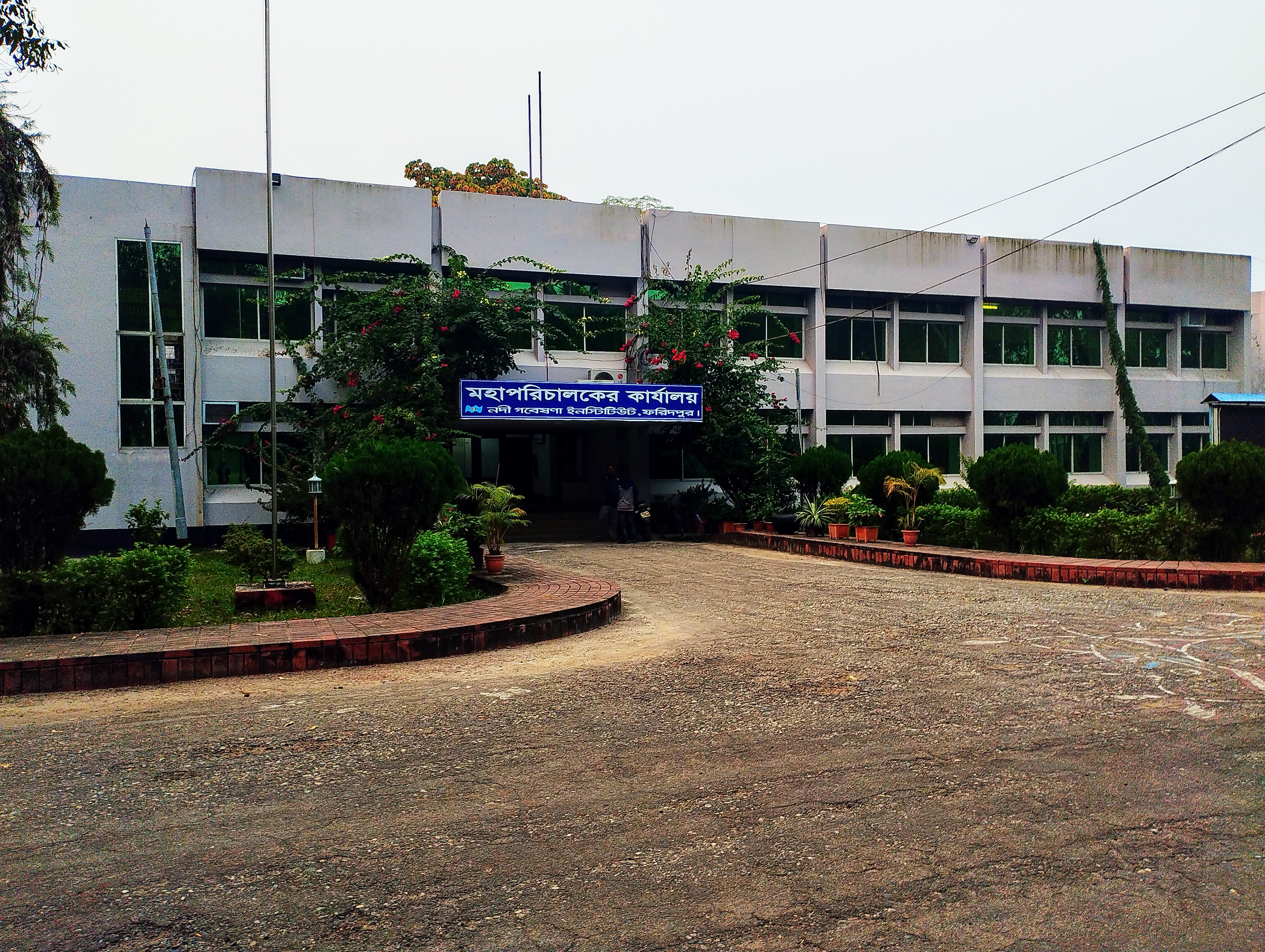
- Bangladesh River Research Institute, Faridpur
- Formation: 1973
- Headquarters: Faridpur, Bangladesh
- Region served: Bangladesh
- Official language: Bengali
- Website: River Research Institute

The River Research Institute or RRI is an autonomous national research institute based in Faridpur, Bangladesh. It is a statutory organization that carries out research and plans in water resource management.

== History ==
The institute traces its origin to Bangladesh Water Development Board's Hydraulic Research Laboratory which was established in 1948. The institute was established 1977 under the water development board. In July 1990 it was made a national autonomous organisation. On 20 August 1991 it was separated from the board. It assists government agencies in the management of rivers and assess impact of development on the rivers.
