= Phillip E. Allen =

American engineer

Phillip E. Allen is an American Electrical Engineer.

== Biography ==
Phil Allen obtained his Ph.D. through the University of Kansas in 1970. After graduation, he worked in numerous well-known companies such as Delco, Lawrence Livermore National Laboratory, Lockheed, Pacific Missile Range, Texas Instruments, and Schlumberger Well Services. He used to teach engineering in such universities as the University of Nevada, the University of California, Santa Barbara, Texas A&M University and his alma mater. In 1980, professor Allen coauthored a book called Introduction to the Theory and Design of Active Filters. Four years later coauthored another one called Switched Capacitor Circuits. Three years later, he became a coauthor of CMOS Analog Circuit Design and another three years later VLSI-Design Techniques for Analog and Digital Circuits of which he was a coauthor as well. Currently he works as an editor for Integration-The VLSI Journal, and Analog Integrated Circuits and Signal Processing and is a fellow at the Institute of Electrical and Electronics Engineers.
