= Karan Watson =

American electrical engineer and academic administrator

Karan Lea Watson is an American electrical engineer and academic administrator. She is the former president of ABET, and the former provost and executive vice president at Texas A&M University, where she continues as Regents Professor and senior professor of electrical and computer engineering. Her research has focused on engineering education.

== Education and career ==
Watson is a graduate of Wichita Falls High School in Texas. She studied electrical engineering at Texas Tech University, earning a bachelor's degree in 1977, a master's degree in 1981, and a Ph.D. in 1982, also working in industry as an engineer during this time.

She joined the Department of Electrical and Computer Engineering of Texas A&M University in 1983 as an assistant professor. She was promoted to associate professor in 1990, at the same time adding a joint appointment with the Department of Computer Science and Engineering. She became a full professor in 1996, and Regents Professor in 1999.

Her administrative work for the university began in 1991 with a position as assistant dean of graduate studies in engineering. She became associate dean of graduate and undergraduate studies and special programs in 1996, and dean of faculties and associate provost in 2002. While dean of faculties, she also served as interim vice president and associate provost for diversity in 2005–2006, and as vice provost for strategic initiatives in 2008–2009. In 2009 she was named as interim vice president, and from 2010 to 2017 she became provost and executive vice president.

She became president of ABET for the 2012–2013 term.

After already planning to retire from her administrative role, she was removed from office in 2017, over allegations of a conflict of interest involving funding for the Center for Change and Conflict Resolution, run by her wife Nancy Watson. Auditors found no misuse of university resources. Watson stated that recused herself from dealings with her wife's center, and claimed that she was denied due process in the removal.

== Recognition ==
Watson became an IEEE Fellow in 1999, "for contributions to engineering education, including outreach to women and minorities and accreditation". She was also named as a Fellow of the American Society for Engineering Education in 2003, and a Fellow of ABET in 2015.

She is a recipient of the Harriett B. Rigas Award of the IEEE Education Society and of the IEEE Undergraduate Teaching Award in 1996, of the American Society of Engineering Educators Minorities in Engineering Award and of the US President's Award for Excellence in Science and Technology Mentoring in 1997, and of the American Association for the Advancement of Science Mentoring Award and of the Women in Engineering Programs & Advocates Network's Founders Award in 1999. Texas Tech University named her as a distinguished engineer in 2012. In 2021 the American Society for Engineering Education gave her their Lifetime Achievement Award in Engineering Education.
