= Word and Action =

Word and Action was a professional theatre company set up by the poet playwright theatre-in-the-round director and actor RG Gregory. It was set up in Lulworth, in Dorset in December 1972. It began as a collective but was constituted as a Co-operative under the Friendly Society Act in 1977. This was superseded by a private company in December 1983.

It was established after a long personal consideration of the nature of participation and the politics of power in theatre. Its performances were all conducted as theatre-in-the-round, in normal lighting and with minimal use of costume and props. It was a long term experiment in the use of theatre in the round and was driven by a strong egalitarian philosophy.

All members were expect to share in all the jobs necessary to keep a small professional theatre company on the road, from administration to finance to performance. It also worked on an open door principle that if there were spaces and people wanted to join, all bar a few basic qualifications, primarily having a clean current driving licence and being able to speak English, they were free to do so. In theory, there was no automatic right to sack people either.

== Instant Theatre and other forms of practice ==
Travelling throughout Britain Ireland and Europe, Word and Action produced plays, theatre, poetry and artwork, specialized in Instant Theatre and ran creative language workshops and courses doing work with schools, businesses and all sections of community, encouraging creativity and language improvement. It worked primarily in schools, but it also worked in prisons, day centres with a range of difficult to reach audiences.

In the early sixties the founder RG Gregory had worked with a number of theatre-in-the-round pioneers, including Stephen Joseph, Peter Cheeseman and Alan Ayckbourne. By the late 1960s he had devised Instant Theatre as a way of trying to eliminate manipulation within the practice of participatory theatre in schools.

Broadly, Instant Theatre demanded a team of three trained actors each with three distinct roles. The 'Questioner' would gather the first scene of a story through a neutral question and answer process in which they were obliged to accept all answers heard. When enough information for that scene was gather the other two would take on parts with everything else being offered to the wider audience. Parts would include other characters, but also include inanimate objects, such tables, doors, mountains, as well as natural effects like the wind and the rain.

The critical thing, like membership of the company, was that all participation was voluntary. No one could be forced or manipulated in participation which often meant that performance included periods of waiting for parts to be filled. But through the sale of Instant Theatre particularly to overseas audiences, Word And Action was one of the few independent theatre companies to survives the severe cuts to community arts budgets in the 1980s.

From 1985 the company operated without subsidy and grew to 17 employees at one point with anything up to four performance teams working in different countries at the same time. Throughout its time, the company regularly toured most western European countries, including Finland, Sweden, Norway, Denmark, Germany, Netherlands, Belgium, France, Luxembourg, Switzerland, Austria, Hungary, Italy, Spain and Portugal. There was even a Word And Action team working in Berlin the night the Wall fell.

== The Stories ==
Although at first the stories were performed and then discarded, in the early eighties the company began to create a record of these 'collective stories'. Around this time, Gregory began to compile a number of them for comparison and critical analysis to see what value if any lay in any themes and patterns that might arise. Drawing from Jung and other work on symbolism he compiled a collection of 400 stories along with an accompanying commentary. The book, The Group Dream was eventually completed.

== Recruitment ==
Although the company did a range of other work from its Dorset base, Instant Theatre became the central feature of the company's from 1980 onwards. Most of the training took place on the job and people recruited came from a wide variety of back grounds. Some were trained in drama and acting, however most were not. Few drama schools and even fewer professional theatre train or work in the round. In addition, the intimate dynamic of Instant Theatre often proved very challenging for traditionally trained actors.

== Alumni ==
- RG Gregory - Founder and chief animateur returned to live in Market Drayton, in Shropshire after 30 years in Dorset until his death in 2017.
- Liz Reeve - Continues to carry on Word And Action's community work in Dorset working with a range of community and professional groups...
- Pag Naylor - The only full-time professional still working Instant Theatre runs a regular touring schedule throughout Europe and with Language Schools in the summer in Britain.
- Tony Horitz - Still works in educational drama and community for over 35 years.
- Mick Fealty - Writer and political analyst and founder of the award winning Slugger O'Toole political website.
- David Steven - Works as an analyst and consultant to a range of clients and specialises in developing international responses to global risks, the development of communications and influencing strategies, and intercultural dialogue.
- Fay Bowden - Works in the membership end of the Co-operative...
- Dave Wood - Settled back in his native East Midlands he works as a poet artist and performer and has run projects for Ilkeston Festival, Draycott Startle, Nottinghamshire Library Service, Derby Gallery and Museum, Creative Partnerships schools, prisons, the BBC, and Leicester Museums and Galleries.
- Gill Horitz is a writer, writing workshop facilitator, producer and arts manager.
- Ruth Hecht - works as an arts manager and producer, based in Bristol
- Richard Foreman - poet and facilitator he works out of Shaftesbury in north Dorset.
- Kate Stevenson completed an MA in Expressive Arts Therapy at the California Institute of Integral Studies in San Francisco in 2002, and has directed multiple social service programs and counseling clinics in California and Michigan, USA. She is the founder and Director of Open Hand Counseling.
- Kate Wood is Director of Activate Performing Arts based in Dorchester in Dorset.
- Richard Swift - Furniture designer and maker. Went on from Word And Action to study at the College of the Redwoods and an MSc at Goldsmith College in London.
- Samantha Ashton - was five years in Word and Action. Moved to Denmark and is associate professor teaching Social Education (pædagogik). Still works occasionally with Instant Theatre in educational settings.
- Pete Spafford - Writer, poet to order and mentor..
- Peter Graham - writer, artist; moved back to New Zealand where he currently runs educational programs in a television studio, amongst other things
- Marjorie Wolton-Maxted - founder member of 'WORD AND ACTION (DORSET) 1973 with RG Gregory and Chris Fassinage. When it all first began!
- Robert (Bob) Grossmith - novelist and short story writer, spent a year with Word and Action back in 1976-77.
- Jez Hastings helped set up the W&A(D)1983 side of the company touring on continental Europe. He is still writing and making photographs as well as international arts projects÷, mainly landscape based.
