= David Irwin (explorer) =

David Irwin (Sarcoxie, 1910 - Scotrun, 18 June 1970) was an American explorer who made the news in 1934 following a dog sled trek to the magnetic North Pole, encompassing 2,000 miles. His account was published as Alone Across the Top of The World. Irwin later became a showman, presenting Inuit culture at the 1939 New York World Fair and other public events. At times this involved bringing groups of Inuit to be present at the events to be viewed by spectators.
