= John Albert Kay =

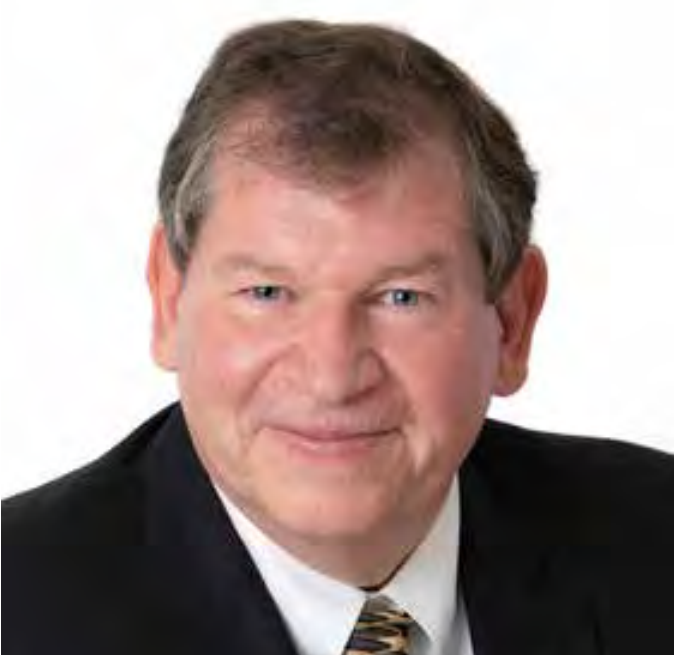

John Albert Kay is a retired Canadian electrical engineer.

Kay was an electrical engineering student at Conestoga College in Kitchener, Ontario. He worked for Rockwell Automation beginning in 1988, and retired as a principal engineer in 2021.

Kay received the 2007 Meritorious Service Award of the IEEE Pulp and Paper Industry Committee. He was named a Fellow of the Institute of Electrical and Electronics Engineers (IEEE) in 2012 "for his contributions to arc resistant medium voltage control and protection technologies". He was a recipient of the 2015 James Farrington Award of the Association for Iron and Steel Technology for his work on vibration monitoring. Rockwell Automation gave him their Odo J. Struger Award in 2020, and in 2021 he received the George Burwash Langford Award of the Ontario Association of Certified Engineering Technicians. Conestoga College lists him as an Alumnus of Distinction. In 2019 Kay was presented with the Outstanding Technical Contribution Award by the IEEE IAS Petroleum and Chemical Industry Conference. Following that award, in 2021 Kay received the Electrical Safety Excellence Award from the same IEEE IAS Petroleum and Chemical Industry Conference (PCIC). In 2025, the IEEE elevated Kay to IEEE Life Fellow. It is an exceptional honor that brings significant prestige and professional recognition for lifetime achievements.
