= Geoffrey Stephen Klempner =

Engineer

Geoffrey Stephen Klempner, of Kinectrics Inc. (formally AMEC NSS Ltd.) in Toronto, Ontario, was named a Fellow of the Institute of Electrical and Electronics Engineers (IEEE) in 2013 for his contribution to steam turbine-driven generators.
