= Fadhel M. Ghannouchi =

Tunisian–Canadian electrical engineer

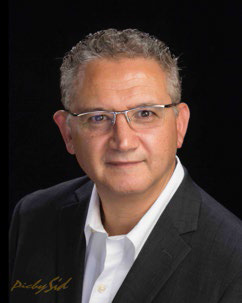

Canada Research Chair (Tier 1) in Green Radio Systems AITF Strategic Chair- in Intelligent RF Radio Technology Founder and Director of iRadio Laboratory

Personal details
- Born: 1958 (age 67–68) Gabes, Tunisia
- Citizenship: Canadian & Tunisian
- Occupation: Professor of Electrical and Computer Engineering
- Known for: High power amplifiers Software-defined radio Digital predistortion Six-port techniques

Fadhel M. Ghannouchi (born 1958 in Tunisia) is a Tunisian–Canadian electrical engineer and university professor who conducts research in radio frequency (RF) technology, wireless communications, satellite communications, and space electronics. He was born into a prominent legal family, led by his father, the Honorable Justice Mokhtar Ghannouchi. While this tradition persists, with three of his siblings law-educated and practicing law as attorneys, Fadhel chose a dramatic departure by pursuing engineering education in Canada.

== Education ==
Ghannouchi obtained his B.Sc. in 1983 from Ecole Polytechnique de Montreal. He completed his M.Sc. (1984) and PhD (1987) at the University of Montreal, and he is a licensed engineer with Ordre des Ingenieurs du Quebec (OIQ) and with the Association of Professional Engineers and Geoscientists of Alberta (APEGA).

== Career ==
In 1990, he was appointed assistant professor at École Polytechnique, Universite de Montreal. By 1994, he had advanced to associate professor and became the director of the Ampli Lab. In 1997, he became a full professor in the Department of Electrical Engineering and the director of the M.Sc. in microelectronics program at École Polytechnique de Montréal. In 2005, Ghannouchi joined the University of Calgary as a professor and was appointed a Tier-1 Canada Research Chair in Green Radio Systems, as well as Alberta Innovates iCORE Chair in Intelligent Radio-Frequency (RF) Technology. He joined the Department of Electrical and Computer Engineering, where he founded the Intelligent RF Radio Laboratory (iRadio Lab), supported by grants from the Government of Alberta, the Canada Foundation for Innovation (CFI), and various industrial partners. Professor Ghannouchi also held Thousand Talents Distinguished Invited Professor at Tsinghua University in Beijing, China Additionally, he has had several short-term appointments as an invited professor at various academic institutions across Europe, Asia, and Africa. He has supervised 65 PhD candidates, 50 Master's students, and 50 postdoctoral researchers. Ghannouchi has co-founded six spin-off companies with his collaborators and students: EMWorks (1995), Amplix (1998, acquired by Mitec Telecom in 2001), Green Radio Technologies (2011), Smart RF Inc. (2017), and AgileMMIC (2018).

== Research ==
Dr. Ghannouchi is known for his contributions in the area of RF amplifier design and linearization using digital predistortion techniques. In 1996, Dr. Ghannouchi proposed an adaptive digital predistortion technique using an indirect learning scheme and filed a patent in June 1997, which was allowed on June 6, 2000. In June 2001, he also filed a second patent for an adaptive digital predistortion technique to linearize power amplifiers that exhibit memory effects when driven by broadband signals, such as 4G signals. In 2004, he made an important contribution by augmenting the perceptron model to handle dynamics and proposed a real-valued time delay neural network architecture. In May 2009, Dr. Ghannouchi invented the multi-dimensional digital predistortion technique and filed a patent that was allowed in 2014 to reduce the deployment cost of 4G and beyond wireless networks and eliminate the need for high and costly processing speed requirements of broadband digital predistortion techniques for MIMO transmitters and for concurrent multi-band transmitters driven by carrier aggregated signals. Wireless infrastructure manufacturers and wireless service providers worldwide have widely adopted the technology described in this patent. In 2016, he co-authored a book about behavioral modeling and digital predistortion of wireless transceivers. In 2025, he invented a new AI-based digital predistortion technique resilient to operating and environmental conditions, which mitigates hardware impairment and distortion in wireless transmitters for which he obtained a patent.

Ghannouchi has contributed to improving the power efficiency of RF amplification systems. His research focuses on innovative designs of load-modulated amplifiers and transmitters, as well as methods to minimize nonlinear distortions and hardware impairments. One of his achievements is the invention of a digital Doherty transmitter architecture, which he filed a patent for in 2011. Additionally, he developed a new architecture for load-modulated amplifiers that incorporates a dual-branch and current-biased design, for which he obtained a patent in 2021.

Ghannouchi's research interests encompass microwave and RF instrumentation and measurements, nonlinear modeling of microwave devices and communication systems, and the design of power- and spectrum-efficient microwave amplification systems. He also focuses on the development of intelligent RF transceivers and Software Defined Radio systems for wireless and satellite communications, as well as Radio over Fiber transceiver design. He has over 950 referred publications, 35 patents (5 pending) and 6 books in the area of his expertise.

== Books ==
- W. Chen, K. Rawat, and F. M. Ghannouchi, Multiband RF Circuits and Techniques for Wireless Transmitters. Springer, 2016.
- F. M. Ghannouchi, O. Hammi and M. Helaoui, Behavioral Modelling and Predistortion of Wideband Wireless Transmitters. Wiley, 2014.
- F. M. Ghannouchi and M. S. Hashmi, Load-Pull Techniques with Applications to Power Amplifier Design. Springer, 2012.
- A. Mohammadi and F. M. Ghannouchi, RF Transceiver Design for MIMO Wireless Communications. Springer, 2012.
- F. M. Ghannouchi and A. Mohammadi, The Six-Port Technique with Microwave and Wireless Applications. Norwood, MA: Artech House, 2009.
- P. Savard and F. M. Ghannouchi, L'électromagnétisme en application. Québec, Canada: Presses internationales Polytechnique, 1995.

== Awards and accolades ==
- 2025 IEEE Microwave Theory and Technology Society Distinguished Educator Award with Citation "For Outstanding Achievements as an Educator, Mentor, and Role Model for Microwave Engineering and Engineering Students"
- 2023 IEEE Canada R. A. Fessenden Award with Citation " for Outstanding Contributions to improved efficiency and linearity in wireless communications"
- 2019 Alberta ASTech Special, Lifetime Achievement Award for "Outstanding Contribution to Wireless Technology"
- 2014 Alberta ASTech Award Outstanding Leadership in Alberta Technology "for Outstanding Contribution to Develop Environmentally Friendly Radio Systems"
- Fellow of The Royal Society of Canada (2010), Academy of Sciences
- Fellow of the Canadian Academy of Engineering (CAE) in 2009
- Fellow of the Engineering Institute of Canada (EIC) in 2009
- 2009 Alberta Ingenuity Fund Research Excellence Award from the Association of Professional Engineers and Geoscientists of Alberta (APEGA)
- Fellow of The Institution of Engineering and Technology (IET) in 2008.
- Fellow of the Institute of Electrical and Electronics Engineers (IEEE) in 2007
