= David Pommerenke =

American electrical engineer

David Pommerenke is an electrical engineering professor, at the Institute of Electronics at Graz University of Technology. He was named a Fellow of the Institute of Electrical and Electronics Engineers (IEEE) in 2015 for his work with system-level electrostatic discharge technology.
