= Ulrich Reimers =

German electrical engineer

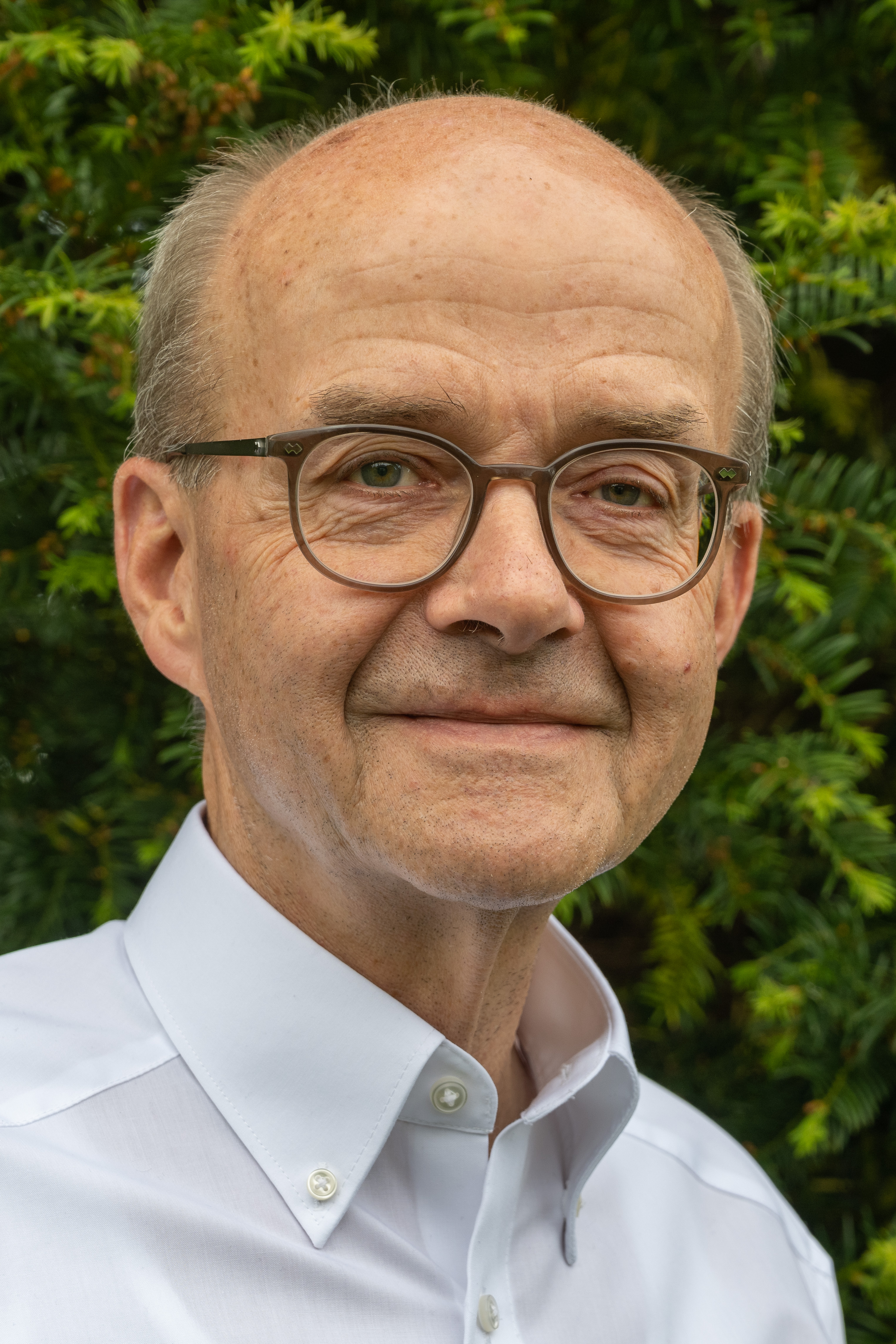
Reimers in 2022

Ulrich Reimers (born 23 March 1952 in Hildesheim) is an electrical engineer and is regarded as a pioneer of digital television. The International Electrotechnical Commission (IEC) elected him for its Hall of Fame of most important personalities.

== Career ==
Reimers studied electrical engineering with specialization on telecommunications and radio-frequency engineering and obtained his doctoral degree at the Technische Universität Braunschweig. After seven years at the Robert Bosch GmbH where Reimers worked in the area of television studio equipment, he became Technical Director of Norddeutscher Rundfunk (North German Broadcasting). From 1993 to 2020, he was the director of the Institut für Nachrichtentechnik (Institute for Telecommunications Engineering) at Technische Universität Braunschweig.

From 1990 to 2002 he was the president of Fernseh- und Kinotechnische Gesellschaft (FKTG), the German equivalent of SMPTE. Reimers was a board member of the Deutsche TV-Plattform, chairman of the "Technical Module" in the "DVB Project" and a member of the Kommission zur Ermittlung des Finanzbedarfs der Rundfunkanstalten (KEF) (commission for determining the financial requirements of the public broadcasting companies). In 2001 he was awarded the Leibniz-Ring-Hannover and obtained the IEEE Masaru Ibuka Consumer Electronics Award. In 2012 he was granted the Niedersächsischer Staatspreis (Lower Saxony State Prize).

Reimers is a Fellow of the Institute of Electrical and Electronics Engineers (IEEE) for contributions to the development of Digital Video Broadcasting (DVB) and the holder of the Ehrenring (ring of honour) of VDE Verband der Elektrotechnik Elektronik Informationstechnik e. V..

== Works ==
- Reimers, Ulrich (2005). DVB. Springer Science & Business Media. ISBN 3-540-43545-X.
- "Articles". Google Scholar.
