= J. David Irwin =

American professor of electrical engineering

- Born: August 9, 1939 (age 87); Minneapolis, Minnesota, US
- Education: Auburn University; University of Tennessee
- Awards: IEEE: Centennial Medal (1984); Undergraduate Teaching Award (1998); Third Millennium Medal (2000); Richard M. Emberson Award (2000); ASEE ECE Distinguished Educator Award, 2001; Society of American Military Engineers: Bliss Medal(1985); IEEE Educational Activities Board: Meritorious Service Citation (1991); Vice President's Recognition Award (2006); IEEE Industrial Electronics Society: Anthony J. Hornfeck Outstanding Service Award (1986); Eugene Mittelmann Achievement Award (1991); IEEE Education Society: Achievement Award (1991); Hill/Jacob Millman Award (1993), Meritorious Service Award (2005); Auburn University Distinguished Auburn Engineer, 1992; Presidential Award for Excellence (2007) Institute for Semiconductors, Chinese Academy of Science: Honorary Professor (2004)
- Scientific career
- Fields: Electrical Networks, Industrial Electronics
- Workplaces: Auburn University

J. David Irwin (born August 9, 1939 in Minneapolis, Minnesota) is an American engineering educator and author of popular textbooks in electrical engineering and related areas. He is the Earle C. Williams Eminent Scholar and former Electrical and Computer Engineering Department Head at Auburn University. Irwin is one of the longest serving Department Heads of Electrical and Computer Engineering (ECE) in the world, having been appointed to lead the (then Electrical Engineering) Department at Auburn in 1973. He had also served as President of the ECE honor society Eta Kappa Nu; President of the US National Electrical Engineering Department Head Association; and President of two IEEE technical societies, on Industrial Electronics and on Education.

== Biography ==
Irwin received a B.E.E. degree from Auburn University (1961), and earned M.S. and Ph.D. degrees from the University of Tennessee, Knoxville, in 1962 and 1967, respectively. He joined Auburn University in 1969 as an Assistant Professor of Electrical Engineering. Currently he is the Earle C. Williams Eminent Scholar and ECE Department Head at Auburn.

He is Fellow of the Institute of Electrical and Electronics Engineers (IEEE) “for contributing to industrial electronics, control instrumentation, and engineering education,” and Fellow of the American Society for Engineering Education (ASEE). Among his notable awards is the IEEE’s Richard M. Emberson Award (2000) “for a long and distinguished record of service to the IEEE in the educational, technical and publication areas.”

== Authorship ==
Irwin is widely known in the ECE and engineering education communities for his undergraduate university-level textbooks in electrical engineering and related areas.

Of special significance are his books Electric Circuit Analysis and Introduction to Electrical Engineering, which are being used in hundreds of colleges of engineering worldwide. He has also written on multimedia computer communications, digital logic circuits, microcontrollers, industrial electronics, industrial vibration and control, and learning and career planning for undergraduate engineering students.

Table 1: Selected textbooks by Irwin
Title	Co-authors	Publisher	Year
Basic Engineering Circuit Analysis	Mark Nelms	John Wiley and Sons	2008
Essentials of Electrical and Computer Engineering	David V. Kerns, Jr.	Prentice Hall	2004
Embedded Microcontroller Interfacing for M-CORE Systems	G. Jack Lipovski	Academic Press	2000
Introduction to Electrical Engineering	David V. Kerns, Jr.	Prentice Hall	1995
Digital Logic Circuit Analysis and Design	Victor P. Nelson, Troy H. Nagel	Prentice Hall	1995

== Leadership ==
During his long career, Irwin served in leadership positions in several major engineering and engineering education professional associations. Table 2 provides a list of key positions.

Table 2: Key leadership positions
Title	Organization	Year
Chair	National Electrical Engineering Department Heads Association	1980–1981
President	IEEE Industrial Electronics Society	1980–1981
Member	IEEE Educational Activities Board	1981,1989
President	IEEE Education Society	1989–1990
President	Eta Kappa Nu	2007–2008

== Entrepreneurship ==
Irwin was associated with several start-up companies, including Aunigma Network Solutions. Aunigma is an IT company based in Atlanta, Georgia US, addressing new generation Internet Protocol (IP) connections. Aunigma’s products are based on intellectual property (IP) created by the ECE Department at Auburn University.
