= Lists of fellows of the IEEE =

As of 2023, the Institute of Electrical and Electronics Engineers (IEEE) has 7,236 members designated Fellow, each of whom is associated with at least one of the 41 societies under the IEEE.

The Fellow grade of membership is the highest level of membership, and cannot be applied for directly by the member – instead the candidate must be nominated by others. This grade of membership is conferred by the IEEE board of directors in recognition of a high level of demonstrated extraordinary accomplishment.

- Aerospace and Electronic Systems Society – List of fellows
- Antennas & Propagation Society – List of fellows
- IEEE Broadcast Technology Society – List of fellows
- Circuits and Systems Society – List of fellows
- Communications Society – List of fellows
- Components, Packaging & Manufacturing Technology Society – List of fellows
- Computational Intelligence Society – List of fellows
- Computer Society – List of fellows
- Consumer Electronics Society – List of fellows
- Control Systems Society – List of fellows
- Dielectrics & Electrical Insulation Society – List of fellows
- Education Society – List of fellows
- Electromagnetic Compatibility Society – List of fellows
- Electron Devices Society – List of fellows
- Engineering in Medicine and Biology Society – List of fellows
- Geoscience and Remote Sensing Society – List of fellows
- Industrial Electronics Society – List of fellows
- Industry Applications Society
- Information Theory Society – List of fellows
- Instrumentation & Measurement Society – List of fellows
- Intelligent Transportation Systems Society – List of fellows
- Magnetics Society – List of fellows
- Microwave Theory and Techniques Society – List of fellows
- Nuclear and Plasma Sciences Society – List of fellows
- Oceanic Engineering Society – List of fellows
- Photonics Society – List of fellows
- Power Electronics Society – List of fellows
- Power & Energy Society – List of fellows
- Product Safety Engineering Society – List of fellows
- Professional Communication Society – List of fellows
- Reliability Society – List of fellows
- Robotics and Automation Society – List of fellows
- Signal Processing Society – List of fellows
- Society on Social Implications of Technology – List of fellows
- Solid-State Circuits Society – List of fellows
- Systems, Man & Cybernetics Society – List of fellows
- Ultrasonics, Ferroelectrics & Frequency Control Society – List of fellows
- Technology and Engineering Management Society – List of fellows
- Vehicular Technology Society – List of fellows
