= Blaž Zupan =

Slovenian computer scientist

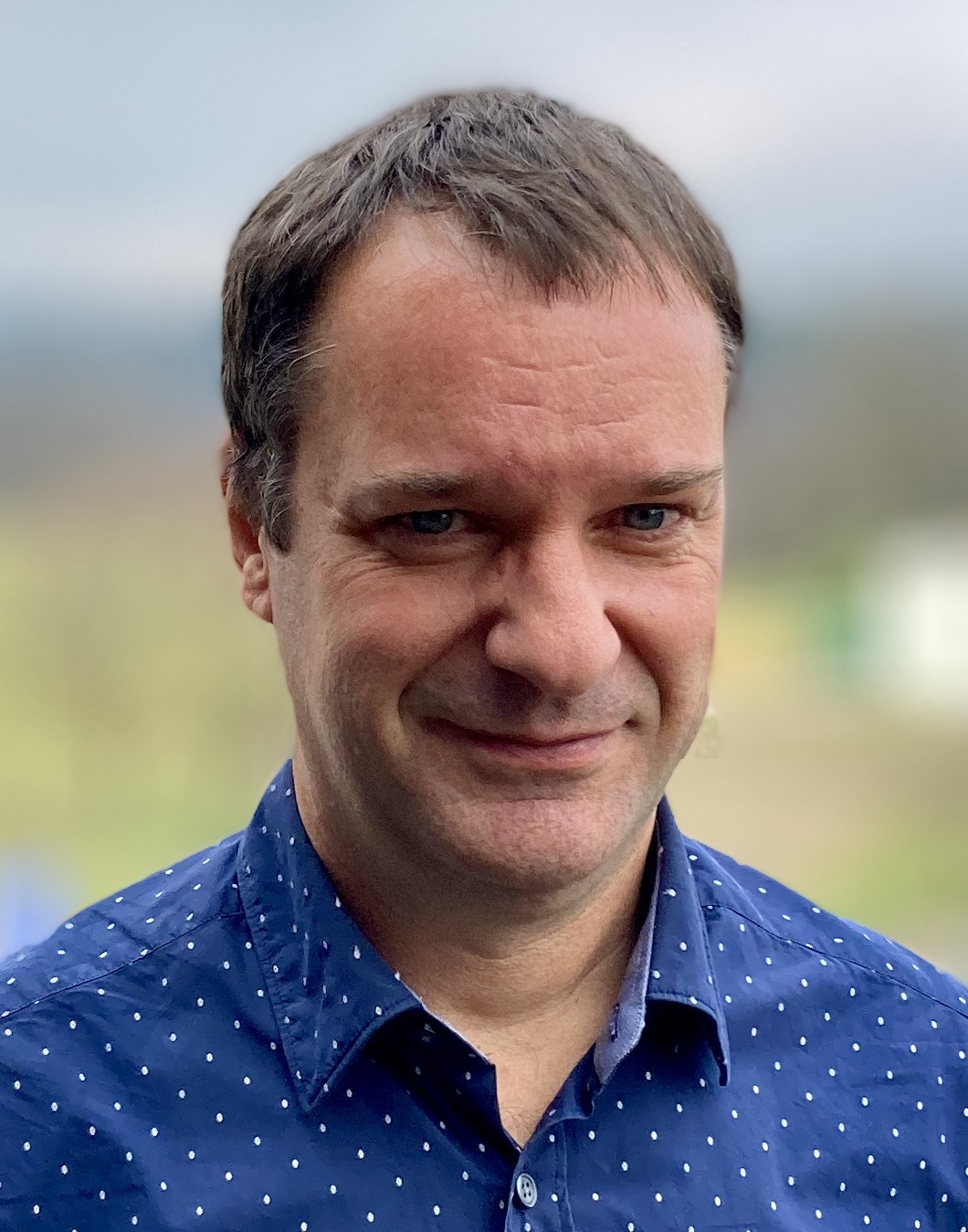
- Born: 26 January 1968; Postojna, Yugoslavia
- Education: University of Ljubljana
- Known for: Orange (software)
- Awards: Golden Plaque of the University of Ljubljana (2011 and 2019)
- Scientific career
- Fields: artificial intelligence, machine learning, data science, bioinformatics
- Workplaces: University of Ljubljana, University of Houston, Baylor College of Medicine
- Doctoral advisor: Ivan Bratko

Blaž Zupan (born 26 January 1968 in Postojna, Yugoslavia), is a Slovenian computer scientist and university professor.

== Career ==
After finishing the Bežigrad Grammar School in 1986, Zupan graduated in computer science at the University of Ljubljana in 1991. Next, he received an MS degree in computer science from University of Houston in 1993 under the mentorship of prof. dr. Albert Mo Kim Cheng. In 1997 he received his PhD degree in computer science from the University of Ljubljana under the mentorship of prof. dr. Ivan Bratko. After spending two years as a postdoc researcher at the Jožef Stefan Institute in Ljubljana, Zupan became in 1999 an assistant professor at the Faculty of Computer and Information Science at the University of Ljubljana, where in 2009 he became a full professor. In 2010 Zupan founded the Bioinformatics Laboratory which has currently more than 20 members. In the years 2006–2008 and 2010–2012 Zupan served as the vice dean for research and development. Blaž Zupan still collaborates with scientists in Houston, US, where he has a position of a visiting professor at Baylor College of Medicine. In the academic year 2008–2009 Zupan was a visiting scientist in the Center for tissue engineering at University of Pavia in Italy.

== Teaching and research ==
Blaž Zupan teaches artificial intelligence, machine learning, data mining and bioinformatics at the University of Ljubljana and at the Baylor College of Medicine in Houston. His research focuses on constructive induction, epistasis approaches for reconstructing gene networks, large-scale data fusion, and algorithms to propose informative data visualisations. In the Bioinformatics Laboratory that he runs at the Faculty of Computer and Information Science in Ljubljana, he leads the development of the open-source machine learning tool Orange. Orange is written in Python and is a machine learning tool with a graphical user interface and excellent visualisations. With an easy-to-use interface and visual programming for the construction of data analysis workflows, Orange aims at the democratization of data science. Zupan is engaged in the preparation of teaching material for practical workshops that use Orange. This material includes scripts for popular YouTube videos on data science, which have received millions of views. With Orange, Zupan carried out over forty hands-on workshops on introduction to machine learning and data science all around the world.

Zupan has published nearly three hundred peer-review articles that have received in total more than eleven thousand citations.

Zupan had more than ten doctoral students and was advisor for more than hundred undergraduate and graduate theses.

=== Selected bibliography ===
- Blaž Zupan, Marko Bohanec, Janez Demšar, Ivan Bratko "Learning by discovering concept hierarchies". Artificial Intelligence 109:211–242, 1999.
- Blaž Zupan et al. "GenePath: a System for Automated Construction of Genetic Networks from Mutant Data". Bioinformatics 19(3):383, 2003.
- Nancy Van Driessche et al. "Epistasis analysis with global transcriptional phenotypes". Nature Genetics 37(5):471–477, 2005.
- Riccardo Bellazzi, Blaž Zupan. "Predictive data mining in clinical medicine: Current issues and guidelines". International Journal of Medical Informatics 77(2):81–97, 2008.
- Janez Demšar et al. "Orange: data mining toolbox in python". The Journal of Machine Learning Research, January 2013.
- Marinka Žitnik, Blaž Zupan. "Data fusion by matrix factorization". IEEE Transactions on Pattern Analysis and Machine Intelligence 37(1):41–53, 2015.
- Marinka Žitnik, Edward E. Nam, Chris Dinh, Adam Kuspa, Gad Shaulsky in Blaž Zupan. "Gene prioritization by compressive data fusion and chaining". PLoS Computational Biology 11(10):e1004552, 2015.
- Martin Stražar et al. "scOrange – A Tool for Hands-On Training of Concepts from Single Cell Data Analytics". Bioinformatics 35(14):i4-i12, 2019.
- Primož Godec et al. "Democratized image analytics by visual programming through integration of deep models and small-scale machine learning". Nature Communications 10(1):4551, 2019.

== Awards ==
Blaž Zupan received already in primary and secondary school several awards at national and international competitions in mathematics and life sciences. Next, as a student at University of Ljubljana he received in 1991 the university's highest student prize for research (Prešeren award). As a MS student at University of Houston he became a member of Phi Kappa Phi. For his PhD thesis he received the Jožef Stefan Golden Plaque in 1999. Zupan is the recipient of the Zois Award (2010), two Golden Plaques of the University of Ljubljana (2011, 2019), a Fulbright Scholarship (2013), and is a six-time recipient of the FRI UL Best Teacher Award (2008–2017). Res Publica, Financial Times, Visegrad Fund, and Google enlisted him in the Top 100 Most Influential Innovators of Central and Eastern Europe (2016). The Slovenian Academy of Engineering selected Zupan as an associate member in 2017.

== In media ==
- Umetna inteligenca spreminja svet. MMC, RTV SLO, 2 January 2018
- Najprej bi v šolah prepovedal PowerPoint. Interview in daily Večer, 13 Januar 2018
- Izjava glede aktualnega stanja v zvezi z epidemijo bolezni COVID-19, (Video of press conference, Blaž Zupan starts to speak at 00:24:57). www. gov.si, 6 May 2020
- Ali Žerdin. Val okužb v Sloveniji ni bil visok. A to najbrž pomeni, da bo daljši.. Interview in daily Delo, Sobotna priloga, 9 May 2020
