= Women's College (disambiguation) =

A women's college is an undergraduate, bachelor's degree-granting institution, whose student population is composed exclusively or almost exclusively of women.

Women's College may also refer to specific institutes:

- Women's College, Aligarh Muslim University, in Uttar Pradesh, India
- Women's College, Kolkata, in West Bengal, India
- Mahila Maha Vidyalaya, in Uttar Pradesh, India, also known as Women's College, Banaras Hindu University

== See also ==
- The Women's College (disambiguation), similarly named institutes
