= Colorado Women's College =

Higher education institution in Colorado, U.S

Coordinates: 39.680632°N 104.964916°W

Colorado Women's College was a division of the University of Denver in Denver, Colorado, focusing on evening, weekend, and online courses for women. It originally opened in 1909 as a private women's college and merged with the University of Denver in 1982.

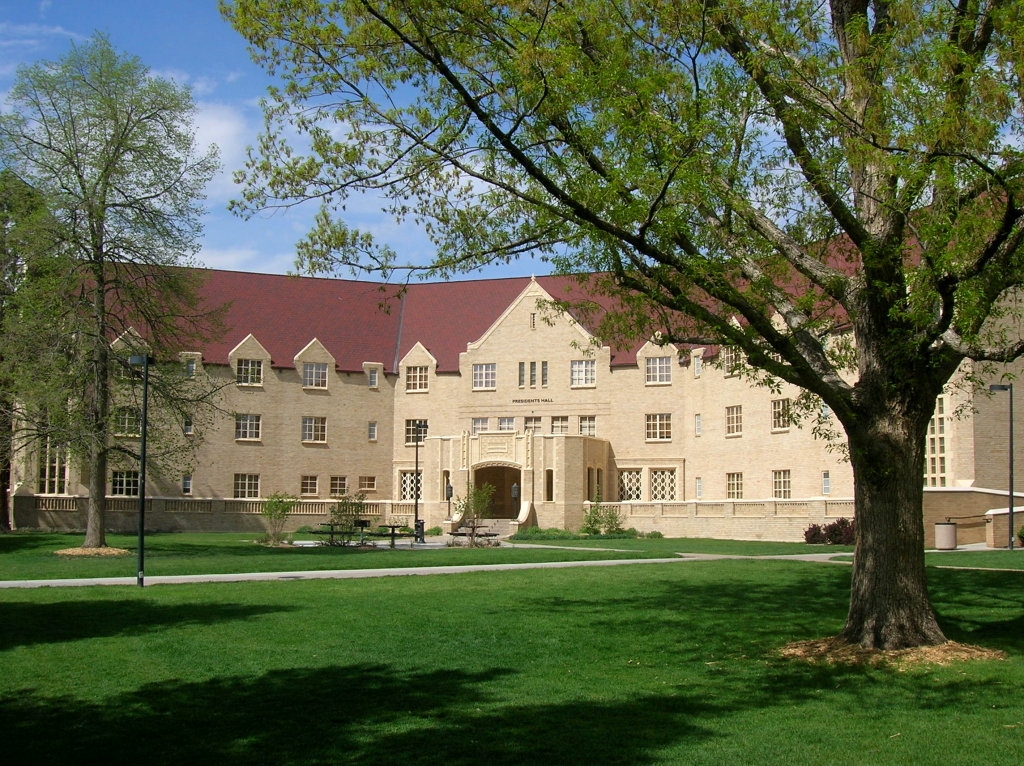
Porter Hall (now President's Hall) at the former Colorado Women's College campus

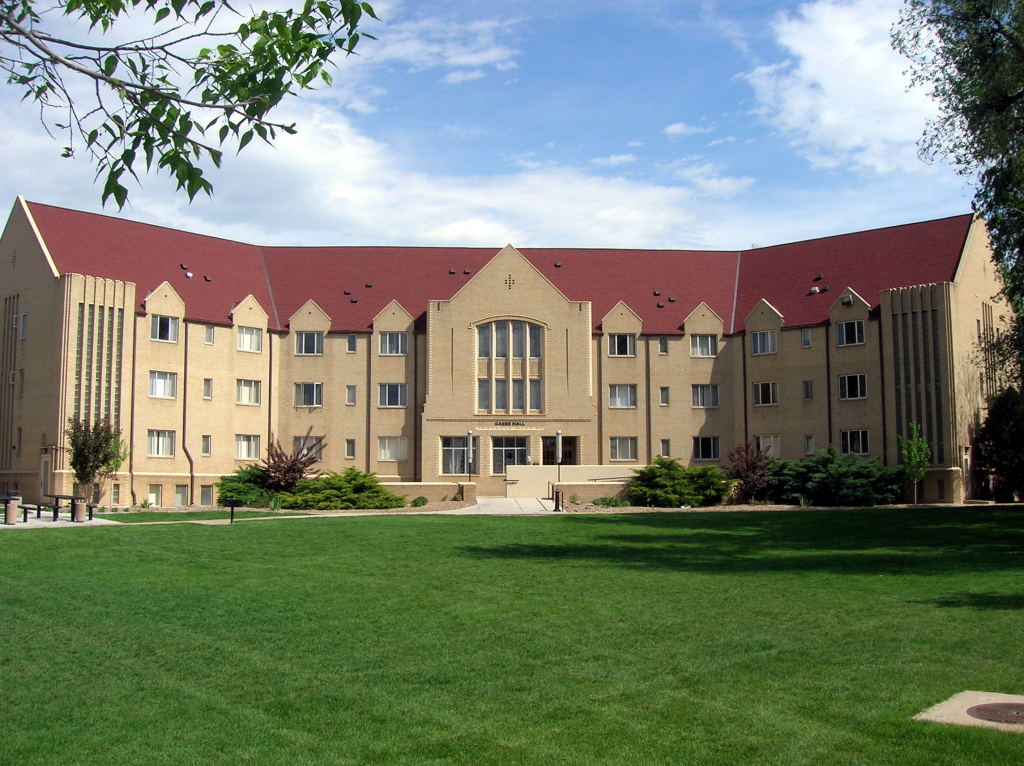
Curtis Hall (now Gaebe Hall) at the former Colorado Women's College campus

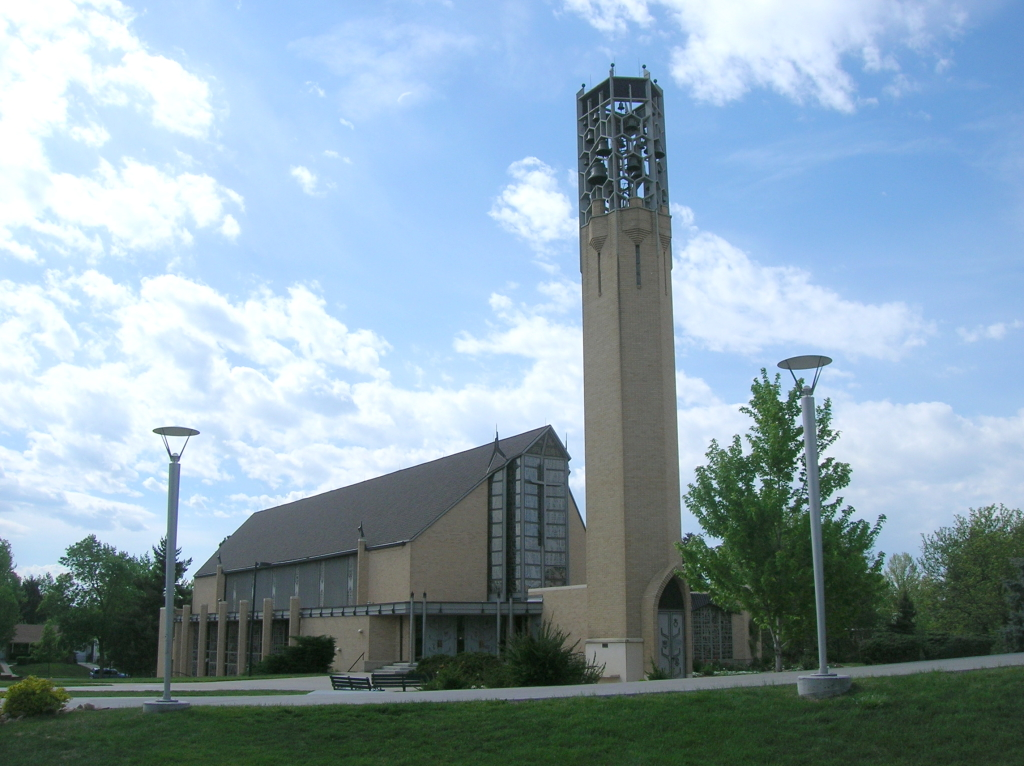
The chapel at the former Colorado Women's College campus

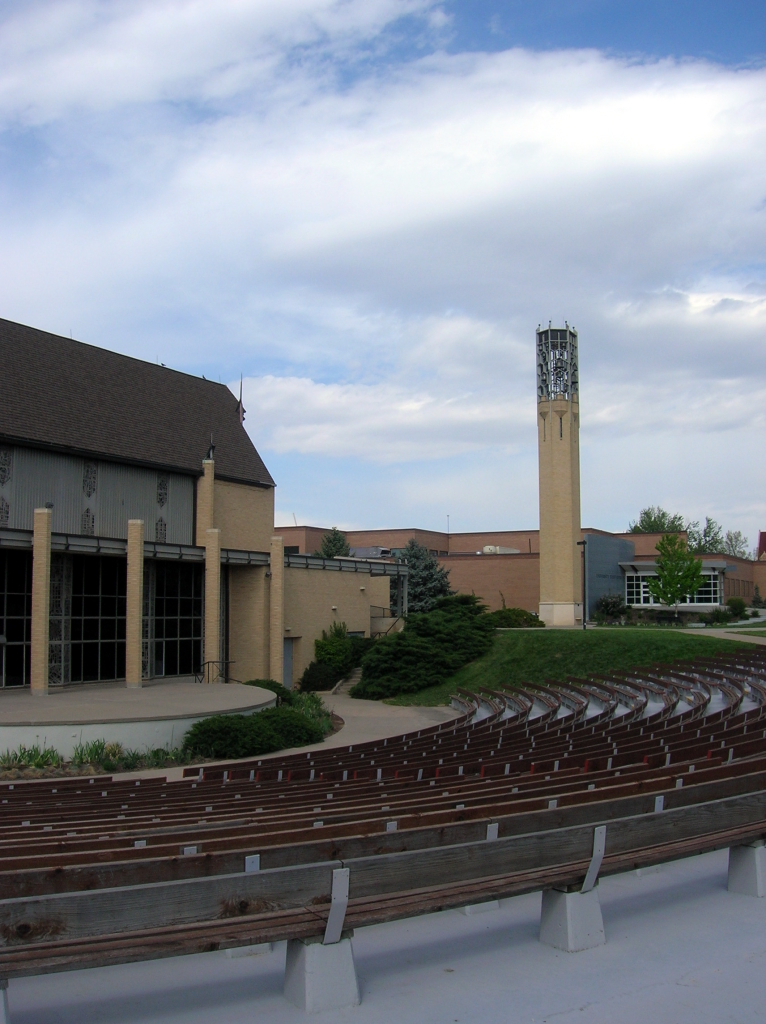
The chapel and amphitheater at the former Colorado Women's College campus

== History ==
Colorado Women's College was founded by the Rev. Robert Cameron, the pastor of Denver's First Baptist Church, who wished to open a women's college in the Western United States that would be equivalent to Vassar College in terms of prestige and academic offerings.

Incorporated in 1888, the college did not open until 21 years later. It received its accreditation from the Higher Learning Commission as Colorado Woman's College in 1932, which it maintained until its closing. The college was renamed Temple Buell College in 1967 in honor of a local philanthropist who made a $25 million (USD) gift to the college the year before. The name change alienated old grads and their donations fell. The Buell "gift" was a legacy in the will of Temple Buell (1895–1990). In response to these financial struggles, the college reverted its name to Colorado Women's College.

As a residential college, it had an active social life for students. The campus newspaper was titled The Western Graphic; other publications included yearbooks and scrapbooks. The college also offered sports including field hockey and basketball.

By the late 1970s, the college had experienced continued falling enrollment and funding, with higher education specialist Gary A. Knight deeming the college "financially desperate" and lacking enough prospective students, the "lifeblood" of the college, to sustain itself. In 1982, the college's assets were sold to the University of Denver, a private university that opened The Women's College of the University of Denver that same year. The university considered that unit, which subsequently regained its original name as the "Colorado Women's College," to stand in historical continuity with the original, independent, "Colorado Women's College." The original Colorado Women's College campus, located on Montview Boulevard in South Park Hill, was home to the Women's College until 2001, when it became the Denver campus of Johnson & Wales University. Treat Hall, a centerpiece of that original campus, was listed on the National Register of Historic Places in 1978; this listing was enlarged in 2023 to include more buildings on that campus.

In 2015, the University of Denver's chancellor, Rebecca Chopp, made the decision to discontinue the Colorado Women's College bachelor's degree program. Five years later, the university disbanded the Women's College and its remaining programs were reassigned to other university departments in the name of financial exigency.

== Notable alumni ==
- Rebecca Ann King, Miss America 1974
- Edna Ahgeak MacLean, Inuit educator and activist for the Inupiaq language
- Cleo Parker Robinson, professional dancer
- Anna Jo Garcia Haynes, early childhood educator
- Inge Sargent, the last queen consort of Hsipaw State
