= Klara Nahrstedt =

Computer scientist

- Awards: 2012 IEEE Computer Society Technical Achievement Award 2022 National Academy of Engineering

Academic background
- Education: Humboldt University of Berlin
- Alma mater: University of Pennsylvania
- Doctoral advisor: Jonathan M. Smith

Academic work
- Discipline: Computer science
- Institutions: University of Illinois at Urbana–Champaign
- Doctoral students: Baochun Li

Klara Nahrstedt is the Ralph and Catherine Fisher Professor of Computer Science at the University of Illinois at Urbana–Champaign, and directs the Coordinated Science Laboratory there. Her research concerns multimedia, quality of service, and middleware.

Nahrstedt earned a diploma in mathematics from the Humboldt University of Berlin in 1984, and a master's degree in numerical analysis from Humboldt University in 1985. She earned a Ph.D. from University of Pennsylvania in 1995, under the supervision of Jonathan M. Smith. She was editor-in-chief of the journal Multimedia Systems (ACM and Springer) from 2000 to 2006, and chair of the ACM Special Interest Group on Multimedia from 2007 to 2013.

In 2012 Nahrstedt was elected as a Fellow of the Association for Computing Machinery "for contributions to quality-of-service management for distributed multimedia systems." She is a Fellow of the Institute of Electrical and Electronics Engineers for contributions to end-to-end quality of service management of multimedia systems, and a winner of a 2012 IEEE Computer Society Technical Achievement Award "for pioneering contributions to end-to-end quality of service and resource management in wired and wireless networks". In 2013 she became a member of the German Academy of Sciences Leopoldina. In 2022, she was elected to the United States National Academy of Engineering.

Nahrstedt is the daughter of University of California, Berkeley professor Ruzena Bajcsy.

== Selected publications ==
Books

- Multimedia Computing, Communications and Applications (with Ralf Steinmetz, Prentice-Hall, 1995)
- Multimedia Fundamentals, Vol. I: Media Coding and Content Processing (with Ralf Steinmetz, Prentice-Hall, 2002)
- Multimedia Systems (with Ralf Steinmetz, Springer-Verlag, 2004)
- Multimedia Applications (with Ralf Steinmetz, Springer-Verlag, 2004)
- Quality of Service in Wireless Networks over Unlicensed Spectrum (Morgan & Claypool, Synthesis Lectures on Mobile and Pervasive Computing, 2012)

Papers

- Chen, Shigang; Nahrstedt, K. (November 1998), "An overview of quality of service routing for next-generation high-speed networks: Problems and solutions" (PDF), IEEE Network, 12 (6): 64–79, Bibcode:1998IEEEN..12f..64S, doi:10.1109/65.752646.
- Román, Manuel; Hess, Christopher; Cerqueira, Renato; Ranganathan, Anand; Campbell, Roy H.; Nahrstedt, Klara (October 2002), "A middleware infrastructure for active spaces" (PDF), IEEE Pervasive Computing, 1 (4): 74–83, Bibcode:2002IPCom...1d..74R, doi:10.1109/MPRV.2002.1158281, S2CID 553269, archived from the original (PDF) on 2016-03-04.
- Chen, Shigang; Nahrstedt, K. (September 2006), "Distributed quality-of-service routing in ad hoc networks" (PDF), IEEE Journal on Selected Areas in Communications, 17 (8): 1488–1505, doi:10.1109/49.780354.
