= Bežigrad Gymnasium =

- Gimnazija Bežigrad

Location
- Peričeva 4 Ljubljana; Slovenia
- 46°03′51″N 14°30′42″E

Information
- Established: 1936
- Director: Ciril Dominko, MSc
- Principal: Alenka Budihna, MSc
- Age range: 15-19
- Website: www.gimb.org

The Bežigrad Gymnasium (Slovene: Gimnazija Bežigrad) is a selective coeducational state gymnasium (secondary school) in the Bežigrad district in Ljubljana, Slovenia.

For a number of years it has been the school with the highest admission requirements in Slovenia and the school with the best national external examination results in the country. Bežigrad has produced a number of distinguished politicians, academics and businessmen. It has also produced more NBA league players than any other high school in the world outside of the United States.

== History ==
Bežigrad Gymnasium moved to the current building in 1936.

The school was founded in 1596 as a Jesuit educational institution located in the town center of Ljubljana, then capital of the Duchy of Carniola. In 1773 the Jesuit order was abolished and the Gymnasium became a state institution of the Habsburg monarchy. Until 1889 it was the only gymnasium in Ljubljana. In that year, the Poljane Grammar School was founded and the old institution was renamed to "First Gymnasium of Ljubljana".

Most of the curriculum was delivered in German language until 1907, when the Austrian government introduced Slovene as the main language of instruction in most gymnasiums in Carniola. The First Gymnasium of Ljubljana began conducting parallel classes in German the following year. Later they were merged into a new gymnasium, called the "Imperial Royal Gymnasium with German Language of Instruction in Ljubljana". The new school, known colloquially as "The German Gymnasium" or the "Third Gymnasium", was the predecessor to the current Bežigrad Gymnasium. According to the official statistic of the time, most pupils regarded themselves as ethnic Germans, although some Slovenes also attended the schools. After the establishment of the Kingdom of Serbs, Croats and Slovenes in 1918, the school was officially renamed to "Third Gymnasium in Ljubljana" and Slovene was introduced as the main language of instruction, although German classes were kept until 1924. In 1929, the school was renamed to "Classical Gymnasium". In 1936, it was moved to the current location in the Bežigrad district. The building was designed by Emil Navinšek and its static load calculated by architect and civil engineer Sonja Lapajne-Oblak and created as the first corridor-free school. When gymnasiums were abolished under communism in 1982 the school was renamed to the "School for Sciences and Mathematics". Among the locals, it became known as the "Bežigrad Gymnasium". In 1990 the name was officially adopted and the school once again adopted a gymnasium curriculum.

== Profile ==
The Bežigrad Gymnasium has historically been the most selective in Slovenia. Admission is decided based on primary school performance and standardized tests. The school does not have a catchment area. The school has consistently performed well in the Matura. The Bežigrad Gymnasium was ranked first among the Slovenian secondary schools in school rankings based on the 2011-2013 Matura results, published by Alma Mater Europaea.

An International School with English as the primary language of instruction is also a part of the Bežigrad Gymnasium. It also runs a small and merit-based class of the International Baccalaureate with results being consistently among the top 5% worldwide. Competitive entry is offered at the end of the second year (year 11).

== Notable alumni and professors ==
Several notable professors and alumni are associated with the Bežigrad Gymnasium.

Instructors:

- Lavo Čermelj, physicist, publicist and political activist
- Edvard Kocbek, poet and political activist
- Dragotin Lončar, historian

Alumni:

- Barbara Brezigar, politician and jurist
- Katarina Čas, actress
- Vlado Dimovski, economist, politician and university professor
- Stane Dolanc, Yugoslav Communist official and politician
- Toussaint Hočevar, historian and economist
- Sara Isaković, swimmer, Olympic medalist
- Taja Kramberger, poet and historian
- Katarina Kresal, politician
- Aleš Leonardis, computer scientist and university professor
- Jure Leskovec, computer scientist and university professor
- Erazem Lorbek, basketball player
- Ljubo Sirc, economist
- Uroš Slokar, basketball player
- Franc Solina, computer scientist and university professor
- Bojan Štih, stage director, literary critic and essayist
- Eva Terčelj, slalom canoeist and architect
- Jurij Toplak, constitutional scholar and law professor
- Laura Unuk, chess player
- Blaž Zupan, computer scientist and university professor
- Slavoj Žižek, philosopher
