= Lapajne =

Lapajne is a Slovenian language surname. Notable people with this surname include:

- Beno Lapajne, Slovenian handball player
- Janez Lapajne, Slovenian film director, producer, writer, editor and production designer
- Lidija Benedetič-Lapajne, Slovenian athlete
- Sonja Lapajne-Oblak, Slovenian architect, civil engineer and urban planner, partisan fighter in World War II
