= Franc Solina =

Slovene computer scientist and university professor

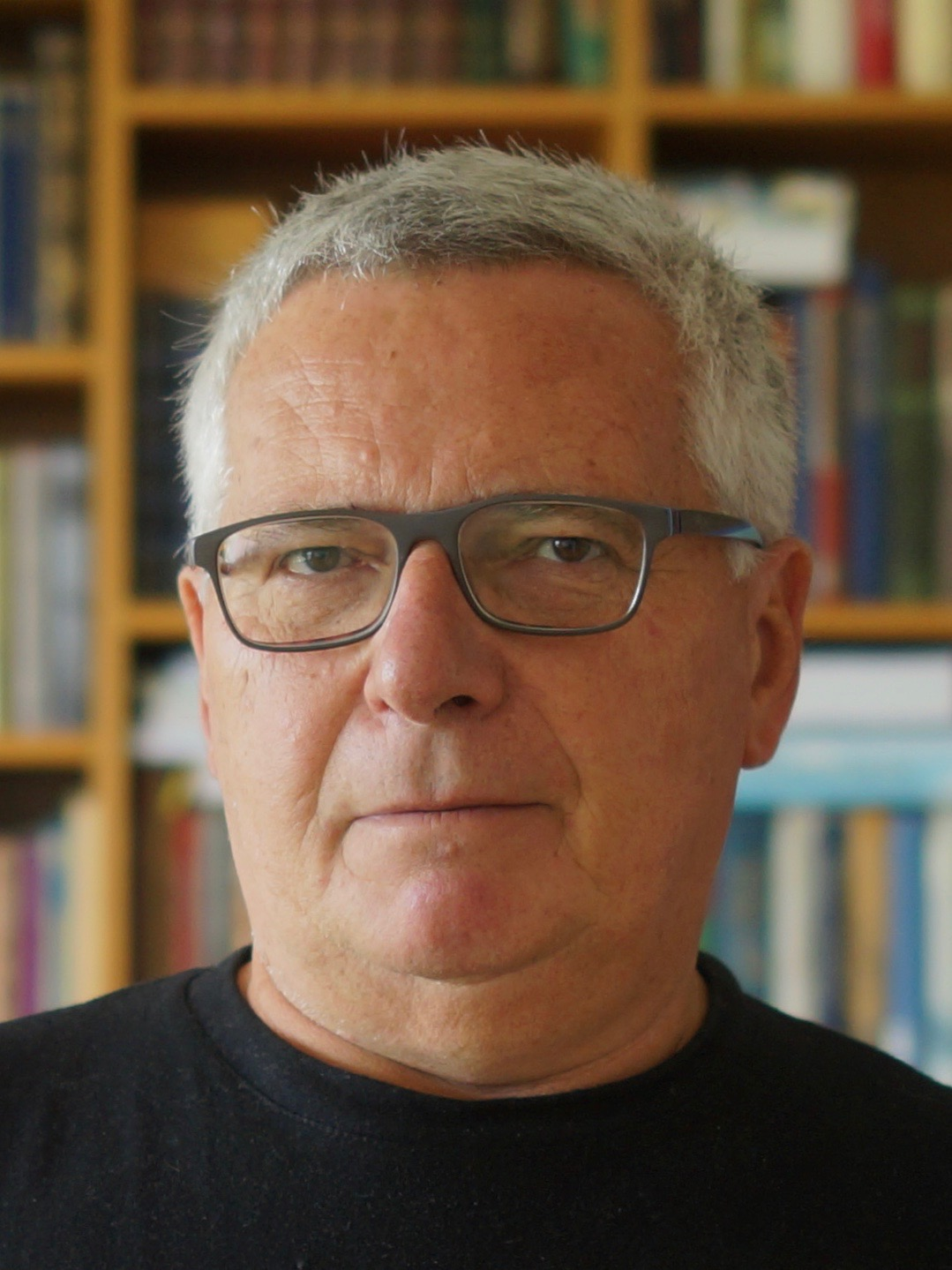
- Born: 31 July 1955; Celje, Slovenia
- Education: University of Pennsylvania
- Known for: computer vision, superquadrics
- Scientific career
- Fields: Computer science
- Workplaces: University of Ljubljana
- Doctoral advisor: Ruzena Bajcsy
- Doctoral students: Aleš Leonardis

Franc Solina (born 31 July 1955) is a Slovenian computer scientist and university professor from Celje, Slovenia.

== Education ==
After finishing the Bežigrad Grammar School in 1974 Solina enrolled at the Faculty of Electrical Engineering, University of Ljubljana where he graduated in 1979 and received in 1982 also his Master of Science degree in electrical engineering.

In 1987 Solina received his Ph.D. degree in computer science from the University of Pennsylvania.

His doctoral advisor was Ruzena Bajcsy, director of the GRASP Laboratory at the University of Pennsylvania School of Engineering and Applied Science.

== Research ==
In 1988 Solina started to teach computer science at the University of Ljubljana where he became a full professor at the Faculty of Computer and Information Science in 1998.

In 1991 Solina founded the Computer vision laboratory where research in computer vision, multimedia and human–computer interaction is taking place.

Since 1999 he is also the head of the nationally funded research program Computer Vision. Solina published more than 200 peer-reviewed research articles.

Solina pioneered the interpretation of range images using superquadrics as part-level volumetric models. He also integrated the recovery of individual superquadric models with segmentation of range images into several individual parts.

Solina's superquadrics recovery method is used in many different disciplines, ranging from grasp and path planning in robotics to modelling the shape of body parts and organs in medicine. Solina himself is using superquadric modeling in digital heritage to model archeological artefacts.

According to Google Scholar, citations of Solina's publications related to modelling with supequadrics exceeded in March 2020 the number 1700.

For contributions to interpretation of range images and for service to IAPR Solina became an IAPR Fellow in 2002.

== Art related activities ==
Solina became engaged also in new media art where he uses his knowledge of computer technology for production of interactive and installation art, but also for his own art projects.

Due to his artistic involvement Solina became a member of the Slovenian Association of Fine Artists.

Since 2012 he teaches also in the Video and New Media study program at the Academy of Fine Arts and Design in Ljubljana.

== Commissions of trust ==
Between 2006 and 2010 Solina served as the Dean of the Faculty of Computer and Information Science when he administered the study reform that enacted the Bologna Process and coordinated the architectural planning of the new faculty building which was unveiled in 2014.

For the period of 2010-2014 he was nominated by the Government of Slovenia to the Board of Governors of Jožef Stefan Institute in Ljubljana.

Franc Solina frequently comments on technology issues in Slovenian press and on television.

Franc Solina became in 2018 a regular member of the European Academy of Sciences and Arts (Academia Scientiarum et Artium Europaea) in Salzburg.

== Selected bibliography ==
- Franc Solina, Ruzena Bajcsy. Recovery of parametric models from range images: The case for superquadrics with global deformations. IEEE Transactions on Pattern Analysis and Machine Intelligence PAMI-12(2):131–147, 1990.
- Aleš Jaklič, Aleš Leonardis, Franc Solina. Segmentation and Recovery of Superquadrics. Computational imaging and vision 20, Kluwer, Dordrecht, 2000.
- Franc Solina. 15 seconds of fame. Leonardo 37(2):105-110, 2004.
- Aleš Jaklič, Miran Erič, Igor Mihajlović, Žiga Stopinšek, Franc Solina. Volumetric models from 3D point clouds: The case study of sarcophagi cargo from a 2nd/3rd century AD Roman shipwreck near Sutivan on island Brač, Croatia. Journal of Archaeological Science 62 (October):143–152, 2015.
- Marko Hrastovec, Franc Solina. Prediction of aircraft performances based on data collected by air traffic control centers. Transportation Research Part C 73:167–182, 2016.
- Franc Solina, Blaž Meden. Light fountain - a virtually enhanced stone sculpture. Digital Creativity 28(2):89-102, 2017.
