= The Women's College =

The Women's College can refer to:

- The Women's College, University of Sydney
- The Women's College, University of Queensland
- The Women's College, University of Denver
