= FANUC =

Japanese robotics company

FANUC Corporation
- Type: Public KK
- Traded as: TYO: 6954; TOPIX Core 30 Component; TOPIX 100 Component; Nikkei 225 Component
- Industry: Manufacturing; Robotics
- Founded: 1958; 68 years ago (as a subsidiary of Fujitsu); 1972; 54 years ago (as an independent company)
- Founder: Seiuemon Inaba
- Headquarters: Oshino-mura, Minamitsuru-gun, Yamanashi Prefecture, Japan 35°26′43.8″N 138°50′34.1″E
- Area served: Worldwide
- Key people: Dr. Eng. Seiuemon Inaba (Honorary Chairman); Dr. Eng. Yoshiharu Inaba (President & CEO)
- Products: Factory automation (FA) systems; Industrial robots; CNC equipment; Laser systems
- Revenue: ▲¥795.3 billion (2023)
- Operating income: ▼¥153.22 billion (2017)
- Net income: ▼¥127.70 billion (2017)
- Total assets: ▲¥1564.77 billion (2017)
- Total equity: ▲¥1381.80 billion (2017)
- Number of employees: 8,256
- Website: Official website

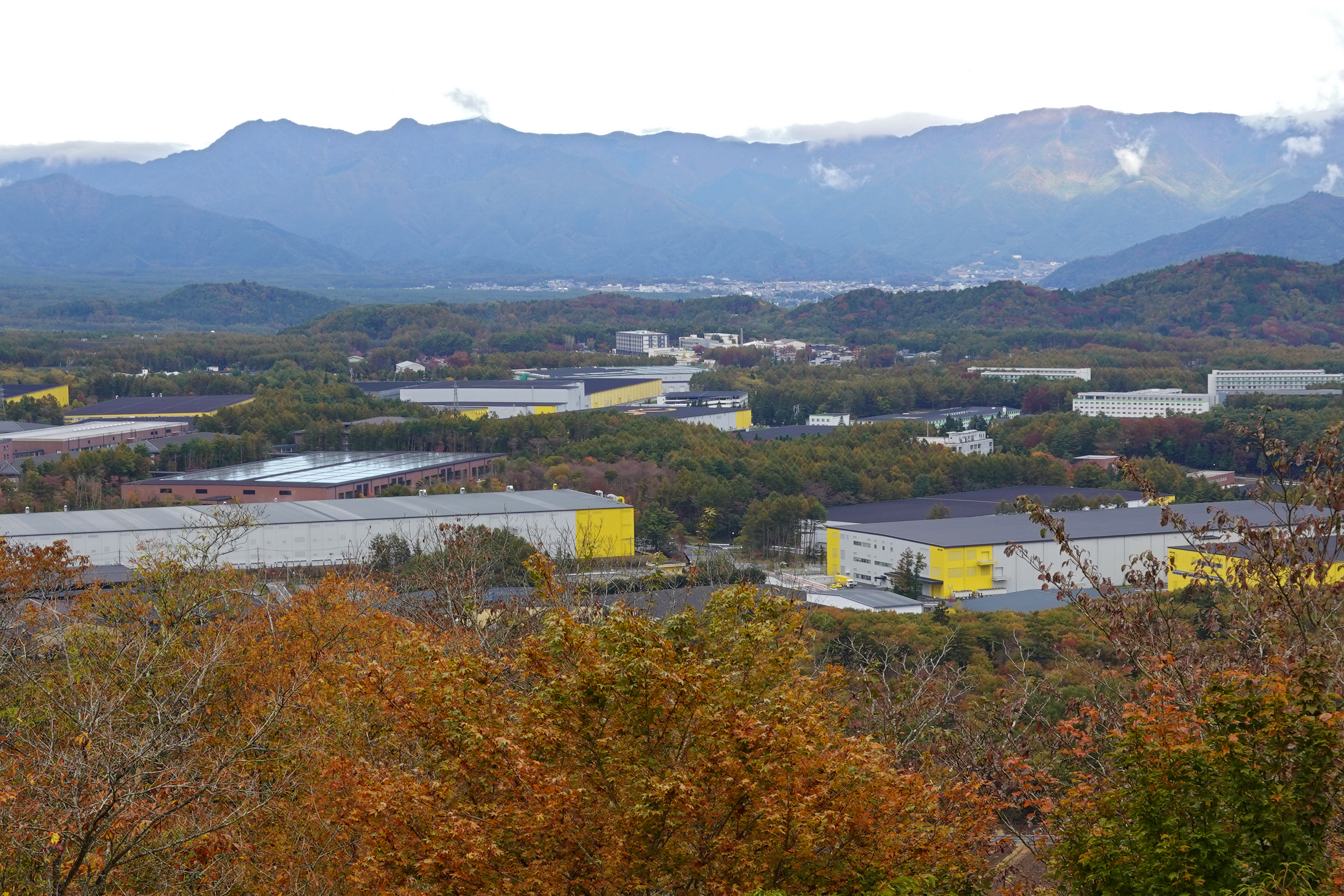
Headquarters and factories

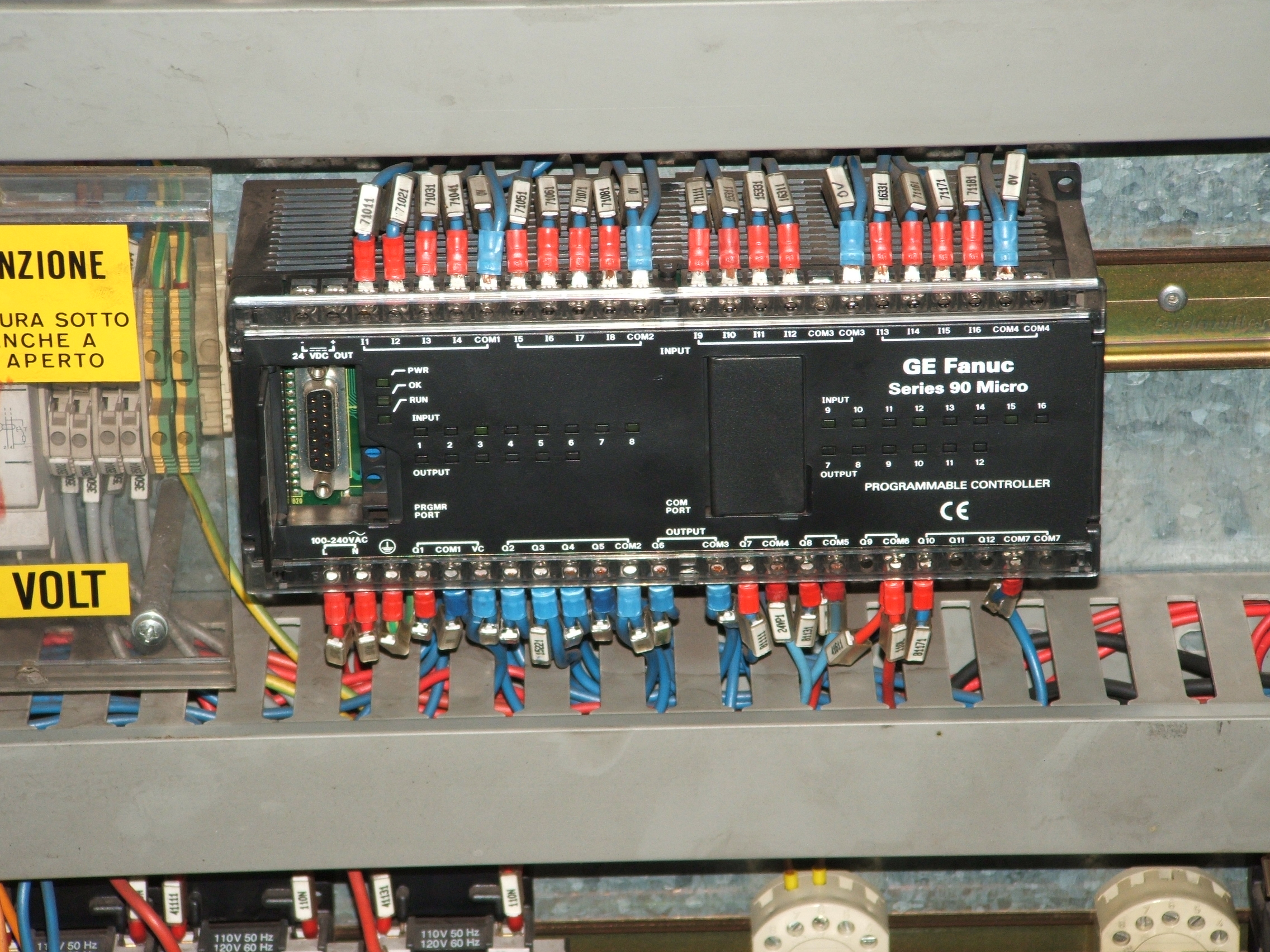
FANUC PLC

FANUC (/ˈfænək/ or /ˈfænʊk/; often styled Fanuc) is a Japanese group of companies that provides automation products and services such as robotics and computer numerical control (NC) systems. FANUC is the world's largest maker of industrial robots.

FANUC had its beginnings as part of Fujitsu, developing NC and servo systems. FANUC is an acronym for Fuji Automatic Numerical Control.

FANUC is organized into 3 business units: FA (Factory Automation), ROBOT, and ROBOMACHINE. These three units are unified with SERVICE as "one FANUC".

== History ==
In 1955, Fujitsu Ltd. approached Seiuemon Inaba (ja:稲葉清右衛門), who was then a young engineer, to lead a new subsidiary purposed to make the field of numerical control. This nascent form of automation involved sending instructions encoded into punched cards or magnetic tape to motors that controlled the movement of tools, effectively creating programmable versions of the lathes, presses, and milling machines. Within three years after spending heavily in R&D, he and his team of 500 employees shipped Fujitsu's first numerical-control machine to Makino Milling Machine Co. In 1972, the Computing Control Division became independent and FANUC Ltd. was established. The next phase of expansion would be computer numerical control, which relied on G-code, a standard programming language. At the time, the 10 largest CNC companies in the world were based in the U.S.; however, by 1982, FANUC had captured half of the world CNC market.

FANUC is listed on the first section of Tokyo Stock Exchange and is a constituent of the TOPIX 100 and Nikkei 225 stock market indices. It is headquartered in Yamanashi Prefecture.

In 1982, FANUC entered into a joint venture with General Motors Corporation (GM), called GMFanuc Robotics Corporation, to produce and market robots in the United States. The new company was 50 percent owned by each partner and was based in Detroit, with GM providing most of the management and FANUC providing the products.

In 1986, GE Fanuc Automation Corporation was established in the US as a joint venture between FANUC and General Electric (GE). Under the joint venture company, three operating companies, GE Fanuc Automation North America, Inc., in the U.S., GE Fanuc Automation Europe S.A. in Luxembourg, and Fanuc GE Automation Asia Ltd. in Japan, were established (the Asian company was established in 1987). GE stopped making its own CNC equipment and turned its Charlottesville, Virginia, plant over to the new company, which produces FANUC CNC devices. FANUC adopted the German engineering slogan Weniger Teile, which means "fewer parts"; Machines with fewer parts are cheaper to produce and easier for automatons to assemble, resulting in higher reliability and lower manufacturing costs.

The company's clients include numerous U.S. and Japanese automobile and electronics manufacturers. The use of industrial robots has enabled companies like Panasonic in Amagasaki to run factories that produce 2 million television sets a month (mostly high-end plasma LCD screens) with just 25 people.

FANUC has over 240 joint ventures subsidiaries, and offices in over 46 countries. It is the largest maker of CNC controls by market share with 65% of the global market and is the leading manufacturer of factory automation systems.

== Business units ==
FANUC is organized into three business units: FA, ROBOT, ROBOMACHINE.

=== FA (Factory Automation) ===
The FA group produces automation equipment and systems that can be implemented into custom industrial automation solutions. Products include servomotors, HMIs, and controls. FA is a foundational FANUC technology with roots back to the 1970's when FANUC was marrying its servomotor product with computers to create the field of computer numerical control technology. Today, FA products continue to be used to create automated systems in over 100 countries around the world. It is common for the FA group to deliver controls and servomotors to machine tool builders who integrate them into a conventional CNC machine. A significant proportion of the world's CNC machines are powered by FANUC controls.

=== ROBOT ===
The robot group integrates FANUC servomotor and control technology into robotic arms for use in industrial environments.

=== Robomachine ===
FANUC also produces a range of finished machines included ROBODRILL machining centers, ROBOSHOT injection molding machines, and ROBOCUT EDM machines.

== Subsidiaries and joint ventures ==
FANUC Europe Corporation S.A., a sister company, is headquartered in Luxembourg, with customers in Europe, and which provides sales, service and support in Europe and abroad.

FANUC America Corporation is responsible for FANUC operations in North and South America. The current incarnation, organized in 2013, unifies FANUC activities in the Americas, including the former FANUC Robotics America Corporation (1992-2013) and FANUC CNC America (2010-2013), which succeeded an earlier incarnation of FANUC America Corporation.

FANUC Robotics America Corporation (1992-2013) supplied robotic automation in North and South America, with over 240,000 robots installed. It also produced software, controls, and vision products that aid in the development of robotic systems. Headquartered in Rochester Hills, Michigan, the company had 10 regional locations in the U.S., Canada, Mexico, and Brazil. The company provided these systems for applications including automotive and fabricated metals to medical devices and plastics. It was founded in 1982 as a joint venture between FANUC Ltd and General Motors Corporation, named GMFanuc Robotics Corporation. A staff of 70 began work at the GM Technical Center in Warren, Michigan. In 1992, the company became a wholly owned subsidiary of FANUC Ltd of Oshino-mura, Japan. The company was a member of the Robotics Industries Association (RIA) and of the International Federation of Robotics (IFR).

Industrial robot Fanuc M-710iC/50S

In 2010, FANUC America Corporation and the prior CNC business unit from GE Fanuc Intelligent Platforms in the US were combined into a new company by the name of FANUC CNC America. This business unit was a wholly owned subsidiary of FANUC Ltd. of Japan and offered CNC systems, lasers, Manufacturing Intelligence software products, field repairs and advanced technical services, expanded training classes, a vast inventory of CNC replacement parts, PCB motor repair and return, field support, and CS-24 after hours support. It was headquartered in the Chicago suburb of Hoffman Estates, Illinois. It offered CNC and laser technical services, training, replacement parts, PCB and motor repair and return, field support, and after hours support. It had over 30 locations in the U.S., Canada, Mexico, Brazil, and Argentina. The company provides these services to machine tool builders, machine tool dealers, and small mom and pop tool shops across a variety of industries. In 1977, the company was established as a wholly owned subsidiary of FANUC Ltd of Oshino-mura, Japan.

GE Fanuc Intelligent Platforms (1986-2010) was a joint venture between General Electric and FANUC Ltd. In 2009, GE and FANUC Ltd. agreed to split, with FANUC Ltd. retaining the CNC business. GE renamed its part of the business GE Intelligent Platforms.

FANUC India operations are now led by Yuki Kita, who succeeded Sonali Kulkarni.

== FANUC NC controller ==
=== Control / device naming conventions ===
Each generation of the FANUC numerical control system has different levels of device control capabilities, generally referred to by a model or series number.

Each controller model typically offers several device control capabilities, depending on which software functions are licensed for that device. Some common control capabilities are:

- M – Milling
- T – Turning (lathe)
- TT – Twin Turret
- P – Punch press
- G – Grinding

Each model includes generational updates, usually indicated by a trailing letter.

Model 0 is somewhat unusual in that both the number zero and the letter O are used interchangeably to indicate the model.

No specific syntax distinguishes the model from the device type and series, with spaces, dashes or slashes. For example, in the FANUC-0 series, these are all valid identifications for various types of NC controls and machines:

Various model names	Type	Series	Notes
FANUC-0MA, FANUC 0-MA, FANUC 0M-A, FANUC 0M/A, FANUC 0-M-A, FANUC 0-M/A, FANUC 0 M-A, FANUC 0 M/A, FANUC-0M Model A, FANUC 0-M Model A, FANUC 0/M Model A	Milling	A	number 0
FANUC-OPA, FANUC O-PA, FANUC OP-A, FANUC OP/A, FANUC O-P-A, FANUC O-P/A, FANUC O P-A, FANUC O P/A, FANUC-OP Model A, FANUC O-P Model A, FANUC O/P Model A	Punching	A	letter O
FANUC-0TB, FANUC 0-TB, FANUC 0T-B, FANUC 0T/B, FANUC 0-T-B, FANUC 0-T/B, FANUC 0 T-B, FANUC 0 T/B, FANUC-0T Model B, FANUC 0-T Model B, FANUC 0/T Model B	Turning	B	number 0
FANUC-0TTB, FANUC 0-TTB, FANUC 0TT-B, FANUC 0TT/B, FANUC 0-TT-B, FANUC 0-TT/B, FANUC 0 TT-B, FANUC 0 TT/B, FANUC-0TT Model B, FANUC 0-TT Model B, FANUC 0/TT Model B	Twin Turret	B	number 0
FANUC-0GC, FANUC 0-GC, FANUC 0G-C, FANUC 0G/C, FANUC 0-G-C, FANUC 0-G/C, FANUC 0 G-C, FANUC 0 G/C, FANUC-0G Model C, FANUC 0-G Model C, FANUC 0/G Model C	Grinding	C	number 0

=== NC controller capabilities ===
When separate computer aided manufacturing software is used to control these different systems, the model differences can be used to tell the manufacturing software how to more efficiently use the system programming capabilities. Some FANUC NC controllers include:

Control name	Series or version	Differences and capabilities
FANUC 20	Series A	Series 20A was a two-axis (usually lathe) NC controller that used stepper motors. Resolution was 10μm. Optional tool offsets were via "decade" switches and selected by program. A machine reference point was optional.
FANUC 20	Series B	Series 20C had a 1μm resolution
FANUC 30	Series A	Series 30A was a three-axis (milling) NC controller that used stepper motors. Resolution was 10μm.
FANUC 30	Series B	Series 30C had a 1μm resolution
FANUC 2000	Series A	Series 2000C was a 2 axis (usually lathe) CNC controller that used DC thyristor drives and had a 1 μm resolution. User memory was optional. Data was displayed by a one-word row consisting of several 7-segment LEDs, addresses (letters such as G, F, X, Y, &etc.) were selected by buttons on the control panel. A two-line position display was optional.
FANUC 3000	Series A	Series 3000C was a 3 axis (usually milling) CNC controller that used DC thyristor drives and had a 1 μm resolution. User memory was optional. Data was displayed by a one-word row consisting of several 7-segment LEDs, addresses (letters such as G, F, X, Y, &etc.) were selected by buttons on the control panel. A three-line position display was optional.
There is no model 4/4000, likely because it is a Japanese unlucky number. But in recent days these models are also available because of the application requirement.
FANUC 5	Series A	System 5 was similar to 2000/3000, it was an 8 bit CNC that used a standard paper tape drive and optional user memory with battery back up. 5T had options of constant surface speed, Multiple repetitive cycles G71, G72, G73, G74, G75, and G76. Tool nose radius compensation was available. Incremental and absolute programming were possible in the same block. The display consisted of a row of several 7-segment LEDs, the same as the 2000/3000.
FANUC 7	Series A	FANUC System 7 was a joint venture between FANUC and Siemens because FANUC were then unable to produce a 5 axis controller.
FANUC 6	Series A	System 6A was the first FANUC controller based on the Intel 8086 16 bit micro processor. System 6A had the standard one-word 7-segment LED display, but was optionally available with a 9" CRT. It was available with optional Custom Macro (variable programming with user defined calculations) and could hold multiple programs in its memory. Non-volatile Bubble memory was used.
FANUC 5	Series B	
FANUC 6	Series B	System 6B had a standard CRT, up to 512 kb of memory and most of the programming features found in modern CNC machines. Whereas the earlier systems were obsolete within a few years of manufacture, system 6 machines are still in operation today (2018), 35 years later. Early system 6 machines used the "Black Cap" thyristor drives from earlier controls, later machines from 1981 onwards used the legendary "Yellow Cap" transistor drives. AC spindle drive were optional with system 6 and these were reliable, unlike the earlier DC units. 8 bit paper readers or RS232C ports were used to input programs. 8 kb of bubble memory was standard, 128 kb was a $10,000 + option. System 6 level two came out in 1983 and is distinguished by 3 extra buttons on the control panel. Level 2 had many bug fixes and a few extra features, notably, 5 axis milling. later 6MB systems had an optional 14" CRT with expanded operator panel and optional FAPT programming. System 6 had a built in PLC.
FANUC 3		Systems 3 and 2 were low-cost alternatives to system 6, although a fully optioned system was quite powerful, if somewhat slow in processing. System 3 used battery-backed CMOS memory with 4 kb being standard. System 3TF had a 12" 5 colour CRT (blue, green, yellow, red, white) and FAPT automatic programming. The CNC program was accessible only via the old style 7-segment LED display and the FAPT conversational programming was done on the CRT. After the FAPT program was transferred from FAPT memory to CNC memory the only way to change anything was via the 7-segment LED display. 3M and 2T controllers were typically used on simple machines like CNC drills and gang-tooled lathes.
FANUC 10		
FANUC 11		
FANUC 15		
FANUC 0	Series A, 1985–1986	
FANUC 0	Series B, 1987–1989	
FANUC 0	Series C, 1990–1998	
FANUC 6		
FANUC 12		
FANUC 16i		
FANUC 18i		
FANUC 21i		
FANUC 30i		First production: 2003
FANUC 31i		First production: 2004
FANUC 32i		First production: 2004
FANUC 160		
FANUC 180		

== Robotics ==
FANUC produces the largest range of industrial robots in the world, with payloads ranging from 1 to 2,300 kg capacity. Most models are of the 6-axis articulated arm style common in industrial environments but specialty models are also produced with varying axis configurations and application focuses. Some specialty models have fewer or more axes or special characteristics that help them perform in certain environments (such as in clean rooms or in wet/dirty wash down areas).

=== Robots ===
A typical FANUC robot system comprises a robot arm (also called the mechanical unit), a controller, and a teach pendant. This equipment comes standard with any FANUC robot and can be customized during the ordering process to suit each application.

==== Arm ====
The robot arm is what most people think of when they think of a robot: this is the servomotor-articulated machine that performs the work. Robot arms are sold without any attachments, or end effectors, to perform work. Integrators or end users design or purchase custom end effectors suitable for their application and attach these to the robot's faceplate. Through-arm cable sets allow the robot to pass signals or pressurized air from the base of the robot out to the end effector. Signals carry useful information from end effector sensors back to the robot to, for example, confirm when a part is being held by the robot or is missing. Signals can mean basic IO signals (on/off) or more advanced communication such as Ethernet. The pressurized air is used to actuate grippers or power vacuum cups (through venturi generators) to grip and move parts.

==== Controller ====
The controller contains computers that control the arm, power supply and regulation equipment, and sometimes auxiliary hardware specific to an application such as IO or networking equipment. Due to the variety of automation applications being deployed, controllers must contain hardware that enables the robots to be used in many different applications and with other technologies. To that end, all FANUC controllers contain the computers and connections required to use 2D/3D cameras, they can function as PLCs, and even operate as a web server to allow technicians to remotely access the robot from a browser.

==== Teach pendant ====
The teach pendant is the robot programmer's primary interface with the robot when teaching and maintaining. During normal operation, the teach pendant is usually stowed out of the way so the robot can automatically run through programmed motion. The teach pendant contains a touch screen display and keypad to view and edit program data, as well as a deadman switch that the operator must hold in order to enable the robot to move. This allows the programmer to safely operate the robot while being in close proximity to the arm. During normal operation humans are kept away from the robots for safety reasons.

=== Handling robots ===
Handling robots move goods, perform assembly tasks, and inspect parts. This class is essentially the standard robot offered and is suitable for most general industry applications. Many robots are produced within this class and are grouped into distinct payload groups and arm families.

Robot series included in this designation include the LR Mates, M-10, M-20, M-900, M-1000, and M-2000 series.

=== Collaborative robots ===
FANUC produces a range of industrial robots with safety sensors and software to enable limited power and force collaborative operation. This allows the robots to safely work alongside humans in a collaborative fashion.

FANUC's collaborative robot series include the CR-Series and the newer CRX-Series.

=== Palletizing robots ===
Palletizing applications have no need for 6 axes of articulation common to other industrial robots because boxes are picked, placed, and only rotated along the floor plane. To simplify design and improve rigidity, palletizing robots are produced with 4 axes of articulation. These robots use a "parallel link" design that keeps the wrist at a fixed orientation that is parallel with the floor. This lets the operator program the robot to pick and place boxes without worrying about keeping the box level with the pallet.

==== Delta robots ====
These robots are sometimes referred to as "spider robots" due to the shape and movements of their arms. These are low-payload high-speed robots commonly used to pick or place objects off fast conveyor belts. It's common to see several of these robots arranged along a conveyor belt, all picking or placing objects at high speed.

Delta robots use 3 arms, each controlled by a single axis servo motor. The 3 arms connect underneath the robot and support the faceplate, similar to an inverted camera tripod. By adjusting the position of each arm, the faceplate is moved around underneath the robot. Because of the lower mass and fewer moving parts, delta style robots trade reduced payload and reach for increased speed.

==== Paint robots ====
These robots are suitable for use in paint booths. Automotive painting was the most common early market, but robot painters are reaching other industries due to the hazards facing humans from paint. Painters are explosion-proof and suitable for use in hazardous environments. An atomizer at the faceplate distributes paint particles towards the painted part.

==== Toploader robots ====
Toploader robots are mounted to a rail that runs over CNC machines for rapid servicing. Mounting one robot on an overhead rail allows the robot to slide from machine to machine, servicing them as required.

==== ARC robots ====
ARC robots are intended for welding applications. They normally have hollow faceplates for easy mounting of welding tips and space on the arm for mounting welding equipment. ARC robots are generally adapted from other Handling Robots, with minor modifications that better resist weld splatter.

==== SCARA Robots ====
SCARA robots are 3 link robots suitable for high speed applications with minimal part rotation and work envelopes. Because they have fewer joints to control, they tend to be more rigid and faster than their 6-axis counterparts. FANUC SCARA robots have special controllers that are more compact and energy efficient than others.

=== Controllers ===
FANUC produces several controllers, each geared towards a certain size of robot.

==== R-30iB Plus ====
This is the most common controller and is used on most handling, palletizing, and welding robots.

==== R-30iB Mate Plus ====
This smaller controller is used on the LR Mate series of handling robots.

==== Compact Plus ====
This is the smallest controller and is used with SCARA robots. It has many of the same capabilities as the larger controllers, but with smaller power amplifiers.

==== R-30iB Mini Plus ====
Used exclusively for CRX-Series robots, this controller is smaller than a Mate and is optimized for use with CRX robots. It is the latest generation controller from FANUC, and was released in 2019.

=== iRVision ===
iRVision, sometimes stylized "iRVision" is FANUC's robot vision product. These products encompass 2D and 3D imaging sensors (cameras) and software that allows programmers to incorporate vision into robot tasks. Vision is commonly used to allow robots to locate parts on a surface and pick them. This allows parts to be fed into a work cell flexible (such as on a conveyor or a pallet) and removes the need for precise fixturing. Inspection is another common use for vision, allowing the robot to inspect a part for defects, confirm assembled parts are present, or perform other quality control tasks. Cameras can be fixed in a work cell or mounted to the robot itself.

== See also ==
- Industrial robot
- Numerical control
