= Sumitra Kulkarni =

Indian politician (born 1929)

Rajya Sabha

Member of Parliament for Gujarat
- In office 10 April 1972 – 9 April 1978

Personal details
- Born: Sumitra Gandhi; 5 October 1929 (age 96) Ahmedabad, Bombay Presidency, British India
- Party: Indian National Congress (1972-1977), Congress for Democracy (1977), Janata Party (1978)
- Spouse: Gajanan Raghunath Kulkarni
- Relations: Family of Mahatma Gandhi
- Children: Shriram, Shrikrishna, Sonali
- Parents: Ramdas Gandhi (father); Nirmala Gandhi (mother)
- Education: MA, LLB
- Alma mater: Women's College, Banaras Hindu University
- Occupation: Politician

Sumitra Kulkarni (née Gandhi; born October 5, 1929) is an Indian politician. Born in the family of Mahatma Gandhi, she studied MA and served as an Indian Administrative Service officer before joining politics. She served as a member of Rajya Sabha from 1972 to 1978.

== Biography ==
Kulkarni was born on 5 October 1929 at Sabarmati Ashram in Ahmedabad. She is a daughter of Ramdas Gandhi and granddaughter of Mahatma Gandhi. She was named after Sumitra mother of Lakshmana. She was raised in Sevagram near Wardha.

She has studied MA in history with specialisation in Foreign Policy and Diplomacy of Modern World from Women's College, Banaras Hindu University and Clark University. She has also studied LLB.

She was an Indian Administrative Service (IAS) officer and was a collector in Madhya Pradesh. She was persuaded by Indira Gandhi to join the Indian National Congress (INC). She resigned from IAS in 1972 and was elected as an INC member of Rajya Sabha representing Gujarat. She became disillusioned with INC during the Emergency thus she switched to the Congress for Democracy (CFD) on 2 March 1977. The CFD was later merged with the Janata Party. She served as a member of Rajya Sabha from 10 April 1972 to 9 April 1978.

She served as a member of the National Commission to Review the Working of the Constitution (2000–2002). She had conducted anti-liquor campaign during the elections.

== Personal life ==
Kulkarni married Gajanan Raghunath Kulkarni, dean of IIM Ahmedabad. They have twin sons Shriram and Shrikrishna and a daughter, Sonali.
