= National Commission to review the working of the Constitution =

2000–2002 Indian government commission

The National Commission to review the working of the Constitution (NCRWC), also known as JMNR Venkatachaliah Commission, was set up by a resolution of the Government of India led by Atal Bihari Vajpayee's National Democratic Alliance in February 2000 for suggesting possible amendments to the Constitution of India. It submitted its report in 2002.

== Background ==
The commission was formed on 1 February 2000. It was reported that former Chief Justice of India, M. N. Venkatachaliah, would chair the commission, and that it would comprise ten other members, which would include one member-secretary, and "nine other members from various walks of life concerning constitutional background". The names had not been finalized at the announcement of the commission being formed. When asked if it would be called a commission or committee, Minister of Law and Justice Ram Jethmalani stated that "it will be called a commission .... a national commission."

=== Terms of reference ===
The terms of reference given to the Commission stated that it shall examine, in the light of the experience of the past fifty years, as to how best the Constitution can respond to the changing needs of efficient, smooth and effective system of governance and socio-economic development of modern India within the framework of parliamentary democracy, and to recommend changes, if any, that are required in the provisions of the Constitution without interfering with its 'basic structure' or 'basic features'.

== Composition of Commission ==
The 11-member commission was headed by former Chief Justice of India Justice M. N. Venkatachaliah. The other members of the commission were:

- B. P. Jeevan Reddy, Chairman of the Law Commission
- Ranjit Singh Sarkaria, Former Judge of the Supreme Court of India
- K. Punnayya, Former Judge of Andhra Pradesh High Court
- Soli Sorabjee, Attorney-General of India
- K. Parasaran, Former Attorney-General of India
- Subhash C. Kashyap, Former Secretary-General of Lok Sabha
- C. R. Irani, Chief Editor & Managing Director of the Statesman
- Abid Hussain, Former Ambassador of India to the USA
- Sumitra Kulkarni, Former Member of Parliament
- P. A. Sangma, Former Speaker of Lok Sabha

== Report ==
The commission was asked to complete its work and make recommendations within one year. However, after three extensions, the Commission submitted its report on 31 March 2002. The report is a bulky one, comprising 1,979 pages in two-volumes, and was received by Law and Justice Minister Arun Jaitley. Volume I contains the recommendations while Volume II (divided in Books 1, 2 & 3) consists of detailed consultation papers, background papers, details of deliberations and the report of its drafting and editorial committee dividing into three books.

=== Volume I ===
1. Introduction 1
2. Basic Approach and Perspective
3. Fundamental Rights, Directive Principles and Fundamental Duties
4. Electoral Processes and Political Parties
5. Parliament and State Legislatures
6. Executive and Public Administration
7. The Judiciary
8. Union-State Relations
9. Decentralization and Devolution
10. Pace of Socio-Economic Change
11. Summary of Recommendations

=== Volume II ===
==== Book 1 ====
1. Gazette Notifications
2. Advisory Panels
3. Consultation Papers
  1. Enlargement of Fundamental Rights
  2. Pace of Socio-Economic Change under the Constitution
  3. Literacy in the context of the Constitution of India
  4. Social Security and Employment
  5. Effectuation of Fundamental Duties of Citizens
  6. Review of the Working of Political Parties specially in relation to Elections and Reform Options
  7. Review of Election Law, Processes and Reform Options
  8. Immunity of Legislators: What do the words ‘in respect of anything said or any vote given by him’ in article 105(2) signify?
  9. Efficacy of Public Audit System in India: C&AG
  10. Probity in Governance
  11. Liability of State in Tort
  12. Superior Judiciary
  13. All India Judicial Service

==== Book 2 ====
1. Consultation Papers (Contd.)
  1. Financial Autonomy of the Indian Judiciary
  2. Constitutional Mechanism for the settlement of Inter-State Disputes
  3. Treaty-making power under our Constitution
  4. The Institution of Governor under the Constitution
  5. Article 356 of the Constitution
  6. Review of the Working of the Constitutional Provisions for Decentralisation (Panchayats)
  7. Decentralization and Municipalities
  8. Empowering and Strengthening local self-government in Cantonments
  9. Empowerment and Strengthening of Panchayat Raj Institutions/ Autonomous District Councils/Traditional tribal governing institutions in North East India

==== Book 3 ====
1. Background Papers
  1. Working of Parliament and Need for Reforms
  2. Some ideas in Governance
  3. Concurrent Power of Legislation under List III of the Indian Constitution
  4. Fiscal and Monetary Policies
  5. Barriers to Inter-State Trade & Commerce – The Case of Road Transport
  6. Article 262 and Inter-State Disputes relating to Water
  7. Pace of Socio-Economic Change and Development under the Constitution
2. List of Organisations/Individuals who sent representations to the Commission
3. List of Organisations/individuals who responded to the Consultation Papers/Questionnaires issued by the Commission
4. List of Organisations/Delegations/individuals who interacted with the Commission
5. List of Seminars sponsored by the Commission
6. Minutes of meetings of the Commission
7. Report of the Drafting and Editorial Committee

== Implementation ==
The recommendations have not been accepted by consecutive governments.
