= Ruzena Bajcsy =

American computer scientist

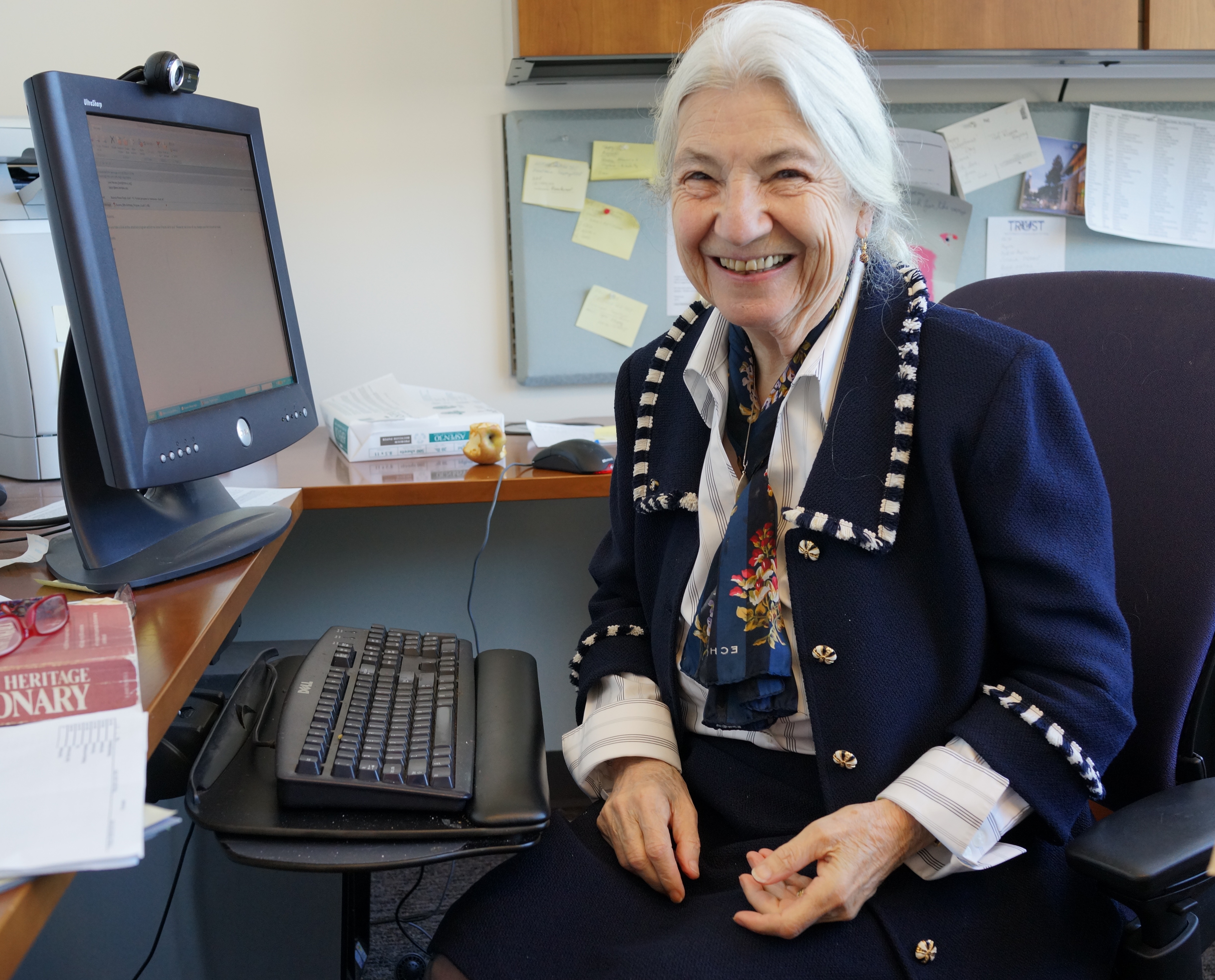
- Bajcsy in 2013
- Born: Ružena Kučerová; May 28, 1933 (age 93); Bratislava, Czechoslovakia
- Citizenship: United States
- Education: Slovak Technical University; Stanford
- Known for: Artificial intelligence; Computer Vision; Robotics; Sensor Networks; Control; Biosystems; General Robotics and Active Sensory Perception Laboratory
- Awards: Benjamin Franklin Medal (2009); ACM Distinguished Service Award (2003); Computing Research Association Distinguished Service Award (2003); ACM/AAAI Allen Newell Award (2001); IEEE Robotics and Automation Award (2013); John Scott Medal (2017); Order of the White Double Cross, 2nd class (2022)
- Scientific career
- Fields: Electrical Engineering and Computer Science
- Workplaces: University of California, Berkeley; University of Pennsylvania
- Doctoral advisor: John McCarthy
- Doctoral students: David Heeger; Jana Košecká; Stéphane Mallat; Franc Solina

Ruzena Bajcsy (born 28 May 1933) is an American engineer and computer scientist who specializes in robotics. She is professor of electrical engineering and computer sciences at the University of California, Berkeley, where she is also director emerita of CITRIS (the Center for Information Technology Research in the Interest of Society).

She was previously professor and chair of computer science and engineering at the University of Pennsylvania, where she was the founding director of the University of Pennsylvania's General Robotics and Active Sensory Perception (GRASP) Laboratory, and a member of the Neurosciences Institute in the School of Medicine. She has also been head of the National Science Foundation's Computer and Information Science and Engineering Directorate, with authority over a $500 million budget. She supervised at least 26 doctoral students at the University of Pennsylvania.

She was elected a member of the American Philosophical Society in 2005.

She is the mother of computer-science professor Klara Nahrstedt.

== Early life ==
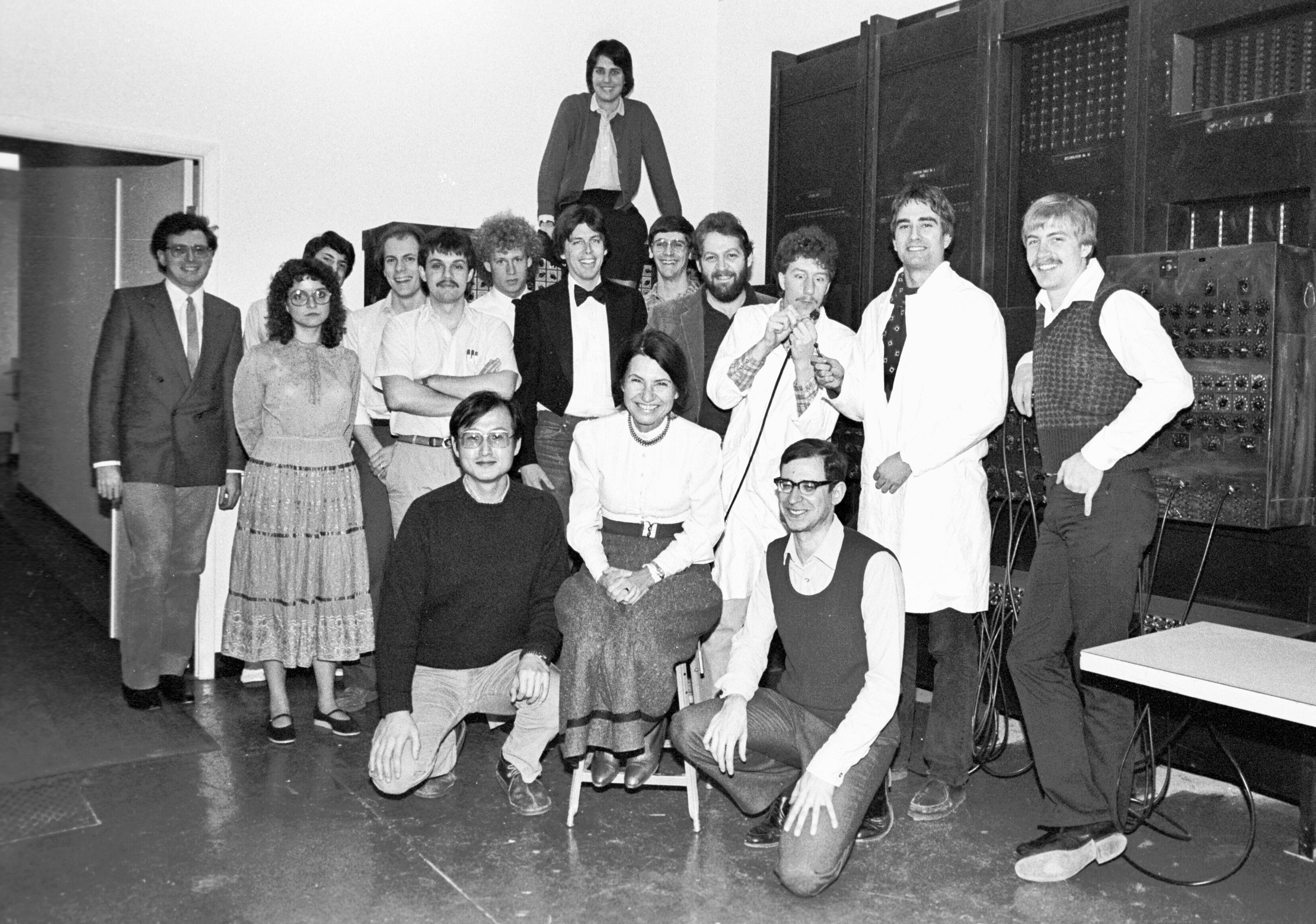
Prof. dr. Ruzena Bajcsy with the members of the GRASP Lab in front of the ENIAC computer at the University of Pennsylvania

Bajcsy was born on 28 May 1933 in Bratislava, Czechoslovakia (in today's Slovakia) to a Jewish family. Although her family was initially spared from Nazi concentration camp due to her father's work as a civil engineer, most of her adult relatives were killed by the Nazis in late 1944. Bajcsy and her sister, the only survivors in the immediate family, were supported as war orphans by the Red Cross; Bajcsy was later raised in orphanages and in foster care. A strong student in mathematics, she has said that she chose instead to study electrical engineering as a university student at Slovak University of Technology because the career prospects for mathematics students at the time led to teaching, which in Communist Eastern Europe required a commitment to Marxist-Leninist ideology that she was unwilling to provide.

== Education ==
She obtained Master's and Ph.D. degrees in electrical engineering from Slovak Technical University in 1957 and 1967, and an additional Ph.D. in computer science in 1972 from Stanford University. Her thesis was "Computer Identification of Textured Visual Scenes", and her advisor was John McCarthy.

In 2001, she received an honorary doctorate from the University of Ljubljana in Slovenia. From 2003 to 2005, she was a member of the President's Information Technology Advisory Committee. The November 2002 issue of Discover named her to its list of the 50 most important women in science. In 2012, she received honorary doctorate degrees from the University of Pennsylvania and KTH, The Royal Institute of Technology in Sweden.

== Writings ==
She has written over 225 articles in journals and conference proceedings, 25 book chapters, and 66 technical reports and has been on many editorial boards.

== Current Relevance ==
Bajcsy’s innovations remain highly relevant today. The concept of active perception continues to influence the design of autonomous systems, including self-driving cars and drones. Her contributions to medical imaging are still utilized in contemporary diagnostic techniques. Furthermore, the interdisciplinary research model she established at the GRASP Lab serves as a template for collaborative efforts in robotics and AI research worldwide.

== Current research ==
Her current research centers on artificial intelligence; biosystems and computational biology; control, intelligent systems, and robotics; graphics and human-computer interaction, computer vision; and security.

== Memberships ==
Bajcsy is a member of the National Academy of Engineering and the National Academy of Sciences Institute of Medicine as well as a Fellow of the Association for Computing Machinery (ACM), the Institute of Electrical and Electronics Engineers, the American Association for Artificial Intelligence, and the American Academy of Arts and Sciences.

== Awards ==
Bajcsy received the Association for Computing Machinery (ACM)/Association for the Advancement of Artificial Intelligence Allen Newell Award in 2001, the ACM Distinguished Service Award in 2003, and the Computing Research Association Distinguished Service Award in 2003.

Bajcsy's most current research has helped her gain recognition from The Franklin Institute in Philadelphia. Ruzena Bajcsy received the 2009 Benjamin Franklin Medal in Computer and Cognitive Science for her innovations in robotics and computer vision, specifically the development of improved robotic perception and the creation of better methods to analyze medical images. Additionally, she was the winner of the 2009 ABIE Award for Technical Leadership from the Anita Borg Institute.

Bajcsy has been named by the IEEE Board of Directors the recipient of the 2013 IEEE Robotics and Automation Award for her contributions in the field of robotics and automation with the following citation: "For contributions to computer vision, the active perception paradigm, and medical robotics".

Bajcsy is featured in the Notable Women in Computing cards.

Bajcsy received the Order of the White Double Cross from the president of Slovakia Zuzana Čaputová, Second Class, on 20 September 2022, for extraordinary spreading of the good name of the Slovak Republic abroad.
