= Ravi Venkatesan =

Indian business executive and venture capitalist

- Born: India
- Education: IIT Bombay; Harvard Business School; Purdue University
- Occupations: Venture partner, Capria Ventures
- Spouse: Sonali Kulkarni

Ravi Venkatesan is an Indian business executive and venture capitalist who has been the chairman of Microsoft India, chairman of the board of Bank of Baroda, and co-chairman of the board of Infosys. He is the UNICEF Special Representative for Young People and Innovation. He is also the founder of Global Alliance for Mass Entrepreneurship and a venture partner at Unitus Ventures.

== Career ==
Ravi Venkatesan is currently a venture partner with Capria Ventures. Prior to this role, Venkatesan has held multiple executive positions. He was the chairman of the board at Bank of Baroda, one of India's Public Sector Undertaking (PSU) banks. He held this position from 2015 through 2018. He was also the co-chairman of the board of Infosys, an Indian information technology services company, from 2011 through 2018. Venkatesan was the chairman of Microsoft India from 2004 through 2011. Prior to this, Ravi was the Chairman of Cummins, India, from 1996 through 2004. Venkatesan was also named as one of the advisors to Arkam Ventures' 3.25 billion INR fund to invest in early stage technology startups in India.

Venkatesan is a member of the Government of India's MSME task force, chartered with developing recommendations for small- and medium-size enterprises impacted by the COVID-19 pandemic. He is also the founder of Social Ventures Partners India, a network of philanthropists.

== Writing ==
Venkatesan is the author of Conquering the Chaos: Win in India, Win Everywhere. He is also a columnist for publications including The Economic Times and Outlook.
