= Meenakshi Banerjee =

Indian cyanobacteriologist

- Education: Women’s College, Banaras Hindu University
- Known for: Cyanobacterial Biotechnology
- Awards: Dr Katju Award; M.P Young Scientist Award
- Scientific career
- Workplaces: Barkatullah University, Bhopal

Meenakshi Banerjee is an Indian cyanobacteriologist and the head of the Center for Applied Algal Research at Rice University in Houston, Texas. She is the former head of the Bioscience Department of Barkatullah University, Bhopal.

== Education ==
Banerjee finished her schooling from Loreto Convent, in Asansol and then studied science at Nirmala College, Ranchi University. She enrolled for a bachelor's degree at Women's College Banaras Hindu University where she studied Botany. Her interest in the subject led her to pursue a Masters degree in Botany and this was where she developed her interest in cyanobacteria.

== Career ==
Banerjee joined Barkatullah University as lecturer in 1989. She became a Reader in 1997 and a Professor in 2005. She is Head of the Bioscience Department at the university.

Bannerjee received the Dr K. N. Katju state level science award for 2010.

Banerjee is a life member of the National Academy of Sciences India.

Her current interest lies in research for the propagation of rare varieties of medicinal plants on algal biofertilizers and studies of cyano bacteria from diverse habitats including the cold and hot deserts where these organisms survive at the borderline of life. She has published on using algae to treat wastewater and to develop biofuel.
