= Jonathan M. Smith =

American computer scientist

- Education: Columbia University (Ph.D., 1989); Columbia University (M.S., 1983); Boston College (B.A., 1981)
- Known for: High-performance networks; Active networks; Secure distributed computing systems
- Awards: OSD Medal for Exceptional Public Service (2006); IEEE Fellow (2001)
- Scientific career
- Fields: Computer Science
- Workplaces: University of Pennsylvania; Bell Communications Research; Bell Labs
- Thesis: Concurrent execution of mutually exclusive alternatives
- Doctoral advisor: Gerald Quentin Maguire, Jr.
- Notable students: Klara Nahrstedt
- Website: https://www.cis.upenn.edu/~jms/

Jonathan M. Smith is the Olga and Alberico Pompa Professor of Engineering and Applied Science at the University of Pennsylvania. He was named an IEEE Fellow for his contributions to the technology of high-speed networking, and he received the OSD Medal for Exceptional Public Service for his service at DARPA.

== Career ==
Smith completed his B.A. in mathematics at Boston College in 1981 and then joined Bell Labs as a member of the technical staff, focusing on UNIX internals, tools, and distributed computing technology. In 1983 he earned an M.S. degree from Columbia through the OYOC (One Year On Campus) program at Bell Labs, followed by a PhD from Columbia in 1989, using several eight-month leaves of absence. He then joined the Department of Computer and Information Science at the University of Pennsylvania as an assistant professor. He was promoted to associate professor with tenure in 1995, spent a sabbatical at Cambridge University's Computer Laboratory in 1997, and became a professor in 1999. In 2003, he was appointed the first incumbent of the newly created Olga and Alberico Pompa Professorship at Penn Engineering.

From 2004 to 2006, Smith served as a program manager in DARPA's Information Processing Techniques Office, where he led several exploratory research programs in computer and communication systems. At the end of his tour, he was awarded the OSD Medal for Exceptional Public Service. Smith later returned to DARPA for a second tour as program manager from 2017 to 2021.
