= Sonali Kulkarni (businesswoman) =

Indian businesswoman (born 1965)

- Born: 1965 (age 60–61)
- Occupations: Former CEO, Fanuc India

Sonali Kulkarni (born 1965) is the former president and CEO of FANUC India, the local unit of Japanese industrial robots maker Fanuc Corp. In her role, she oversees all Sales, Marketing, Business Development activities for all products including CNC, Robots, Robomachines and System Integration for Fanuc, India.

Kulkarni has been named one of the most powerful businesswomen in 2014.

== Personal life ==
Ms. Kulkarni is married to Ravi Venkatesan. She is the daughter of Sumitra Kulkarni and is the great-grandchild of Mahatma Gandhi and Kasturba Gandhi.

== Education ==
Ms. Kulkarni completed her MBA from Ohio State University and she is a member of Institute of Chartered Accountants of India and American Institute of Certified Public Accountants. She has keen interest in environmental sustainability.

== Career ==
Ms. Kulkarni has worked as a Financial Analyst in the US, and took charge as CEO of Fanuc India in 2006.
