= Anna Jo Garcia Haynes =

Early childhood educator in Colorado (1934-)

- Born: April 18, 1934; Denver, Colorado
- Occupations: Educator and non-profit administrator

Anna Jo Garcia Haynes (born April 18, 1934) is a former educator in Colorado who specialized in early childhood education. She was instrumental in early childhood education development in Colorado, where she founded the Mile High Montessori Early Learning Centers in Denver, founded the Mile High Montessori Early Learning Centers, co-founded Colorado Children's Campaign, and has been recognized by many organizations in Colorado including the Colorado Women's Hall of Fame.

== Biography ==
Anna Jo Garcia Haynes was born on April 18, 1934 in Denver, Colorado. Her parents divorced, and their family had to use the support of public assistance. She is Latina and Native American, and was born in northeast Denver, where the Auraria campus now sits. Her family moved around northeast Denver often. She attended Mitchell Elementary, Cole Middle School, and graduated from Manual High School.

She had to repeat kindergarten, which was an experience that led to her spending her life in early education.

Haynes received a scholarship from Manual High School to attend Colorado Women's College. She wanted to give back to the community that had supported her, so she started working for the city in the parks and recreation department.

=== Early childhood education ===
She started her career as a teacher, but she wanted to stay home with her children. She began to look after her neighbors' children, and got licensed to have a day care in her home.

In 1966, she was co-chair of the education committee of the Congress of Racial Equality. After experiencing discrimination because of her Latina and Native American heritage, her interracial marriage, and her multiracial children, she got involved with The Congress of Racial Equality.

Governor Roy Romer's wife reached out to Haynes for her expertise in early education. She invited Haynes to be part of the federal Head Start initiative. In 1968, she was a founding board member of the Child Opportunity Head Start program.

She began the Mile High Child Care, which is now known as Mile High Early Learning.

In 1985, Haynes was a founding chairperson for the new Colorado Children's Campaign.

=== Nonprofit administration ===
In addition to educating, Haynes has been involved in nonprofit administration and has developed or sat on boards for many organizations in Colorado.

She was the executive director, and is still founder and President Emeritus, of Mile High Early Learning Centers, which were incorporated in 1972. She was a founding mother and the third president Women's Foundation of Colorado.

Haynes was appointed Co-Chair of the Early Childhood Leadership Commission of Colorado by Governor John Hickenlooper. She was a Board Member for Mayor Michael Hancock's Education Compact. She served as chair for Denver Public Schools and Denver's Early Childhood Council.

Haynes was appointed to the Congressional Caucus for Women's Issues by Congresswoman Patricia Schoeder, and served as an advisory member of the White House Conference on Children and Youth.

In 2010, Haynes retired from Mile High Montessori Early Learning Centers after 40 years.

In 2022, Governor Jared Polis signed a bill establishing a new Department of Early Childhood with free pre-school for all 4-year-olds in Colorado. Co-sponsor Sen. Janet Buckner thanked Haynes for her advocacy and mentorship.

=== Personal life ===
When she married her husband, they had to travel to New Mexico because he was Black, and miscegenation was illegal. She has five children: Mary, Allegra "Happy", Khadija, Michael, and Lee Ann.

== Recognition and awards ==
In 2000, Representative Diana DeGette introduced a Congressional Tribute to Haynes for her service to the 1st Congressional district of Colorado.

Mile High United Way created an award named for her, the "Anna Jo Haynes Caring about Kids Award".

Metropolitan State University of Denver created the Anna Jo Garcia Haynes Legacy Project to promote advocacy of early childhood education. This Legacy Project includes projects like archiving her papers at Auraria campus, an endowment in her name, and an event series all related to early childhood education.

=== Awards ===
- 2015, Community Impact Award to Anna Jo Haynes family, including daughters Mary, Happy, and Khadija, from Metro Volunteers
- 2016, Colorado Women's Hall of Fame Inductee
- 2018, Latina Legacy Circle Inductee
- 2022, Women of Distinction Gold, from Girl Scouts of Colorado
- 2022, Frances Wisebart Jacobs Award from the Mile High United Way
- 2023, honorary Master's in Education, Metropolitan State University Denver
- 2023, honorary Doctor of Humane Letters, University of Colorado Denver
