= Seiuemon Inaba =

Japanese roboticist (1925–2020)

- Born: 1925
- Died: October 2, 2020
- Education: University of Tokyo, Tokyo Institute of Technology
- Awards: IEEE Robotics and Automation Award
- Scientific career
- Fields: Robotics
- Workplaces: FANUC

Seiuemon Inaba (1925-2020) was a Japanese roboticist who was the founder and honorary chairman of FANUC. Inaba was born in 1925 in Ibaraki Prefecture, north of Tokyo. Inaba played a key role in the development of the robot industry.

In 1992, he was elected a member of the National Academy of Engineering for pioneering achievements in numerically controlled machine tools and factory automation and contributions to engineering research and education.

Inaba died on October 2, 2020, at the age of 95.

== Biography ==
- 1946: Bachelor of Engineering from University of Tokyo
- 1946: Joined Fujitsu
- 1956: Introduced efficient and accurate servo control methods for numerical control
- 1965: Ph.D. in engineering from the Tokyo Institute of Technology
- 1972: Founded and served as Executive Director of Fujitsu Fanuc, which later becomes FANUC Corporation
- 1975: Served as first President of FANUC
- 1995: Honorary Chairman of FANUC

=== Awards and honors ===
- 2005: IEEE Robotics and Automation Award
