= IEEE Robotics and Automation Award =

Technical award

- Awarded for: Contributions in the field of robotics and automation
- Presented by: Institute of Electrical and Electronics Engineers
- First award: 2002
- Website: IEEE Robotics and Automation Award

The IEEE Robotics and Automation Award is a Technical Field Award of the Institute of Electrical and Electronics Engineers (IEEE) that was established by the IEEE Board of Directors in 2002. This award is presented for contributions in the field of robotics and automation.

This award may be presented to an individual or team of up to three people.

Recipients of this award receive a bronze medal, certificate, and honorarium.

== Recipients ==
- 2027: Russell Taylor
- 2026: Roland Siegwart
- 2025: Marc Raibert
- 2024: Paolo Dario
- 2023: Daniela Rus
- 2022: Wolfram Burgard
- 2021: Tomas Lozano-Perez and Jean-Claude Latombe
- 2020: Vijay Kumar
- 2019: Zexiang Li and Tao Wang
- 2018: Matthew T. Mason
- 2017: Oussama Khatib
- 2016: Raffaello D'Andrea
- 2015: Rodney Allen Brooks
- 2014: Shigeo Hirose
- 2013: Ruzena Bajcsy
- 2012: Bernard Roth
- 2011: Hirochika Inoue
- 2010: Toshio Fukuda
- 2009: Antal Bejczy
- 2008: Paul G. Backes
- 2008: Larry H. Matthies
- 2008: Eric T. Baumgartner
- 2007: Gerd Hirzinger
- 2006: George A. Bekey
- 2005: Seiuemon Inaba
- 2004: Joseph F. Engelberger
