= Orange (software) =

Open-source data analysis software

- Developer: University of Ljubljana
- Release: 10 October 1996; 29 years ago ...
- Stable release: 3.40.0 / 20 December 2025; 8 months ago
- Written in: Python, Cython, C++, C
- Operating system: Cross-platform
- Type: Machine learning, Data mining, Data visualization, Data analysis
- License: GPLv3 or later
- Website: orangedatamining.com
- Repository: github.com/biolab/orange3

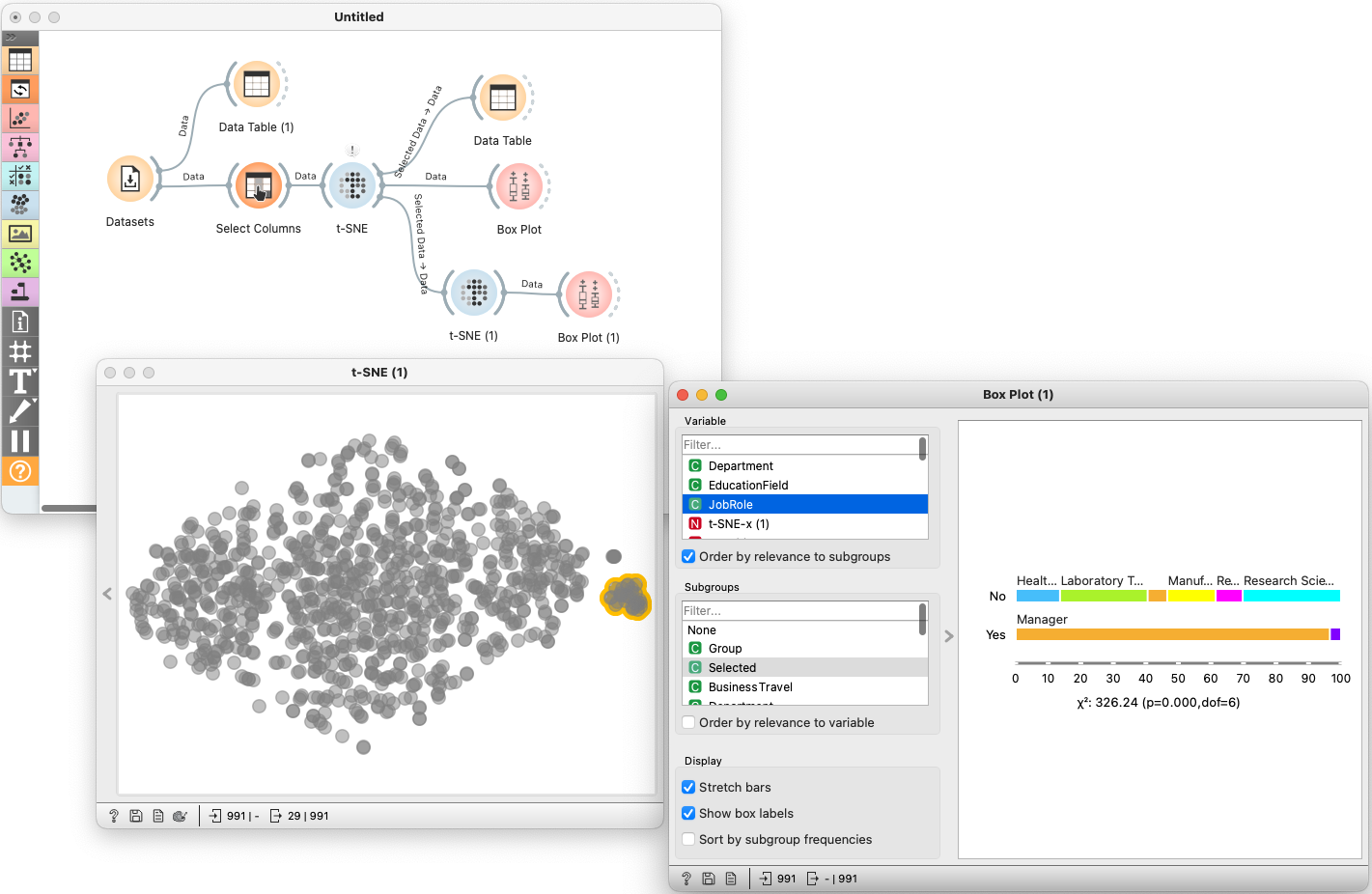
A typical workflow in Orange 3

Orange is an open-source software package for data visualization, machine learning, data mining, and data analysis. It provides a visual programming environment in which users construct data-analysis workflows by connecting graphical components called widgets. Orange is implemented primarily in Python and supports interactive exploratory data analysis as well as machine-learning workflows.

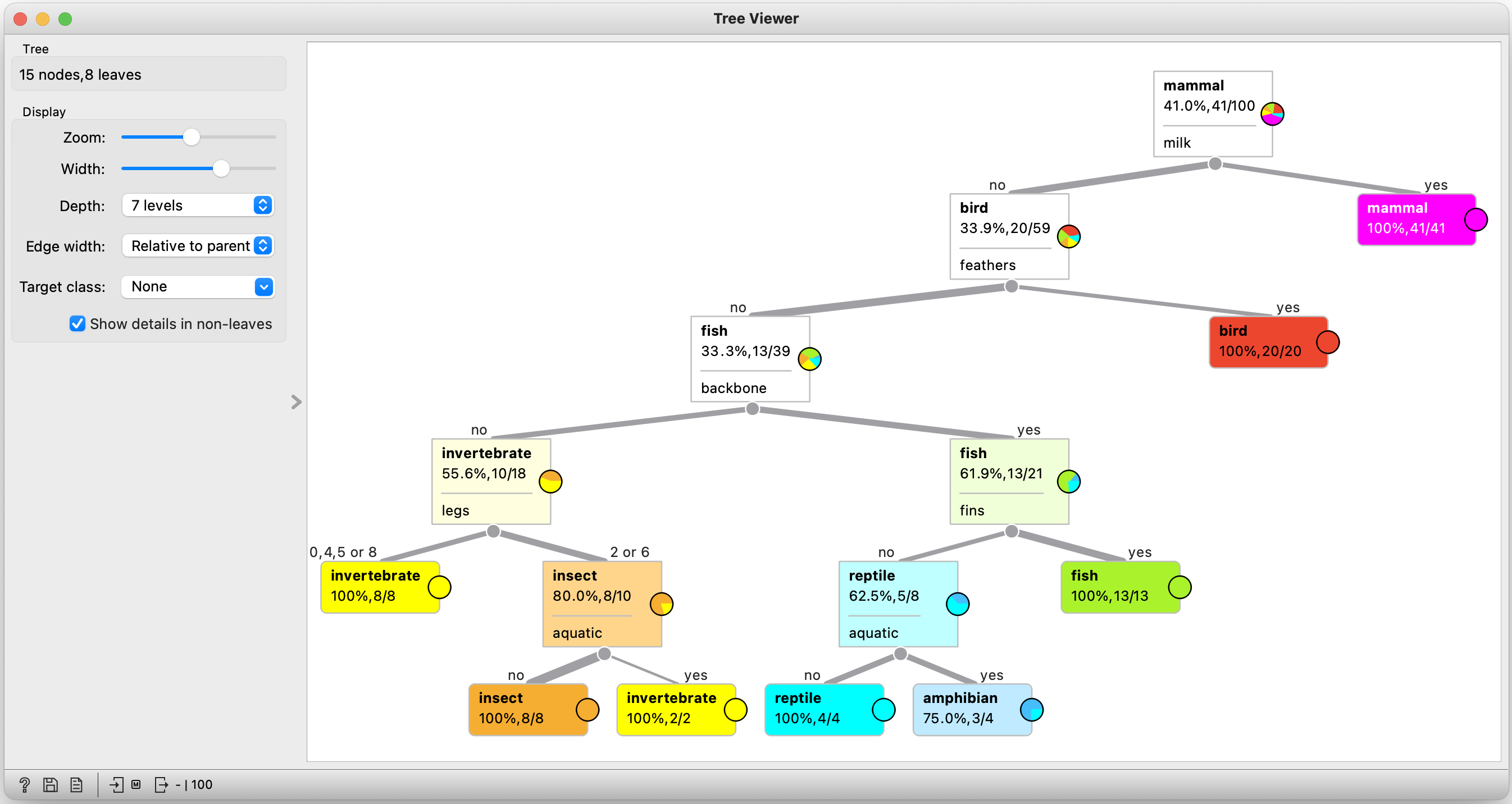
Classification Tree widget in Orange 3

== Description ==
Orange uses a visual programming approach in which data-analysis workflows are constructed by connecting graphical components called widgets. Individual widgets perform operations such as data input and preprocessing, visualization, predictive modelling, clustering, and model evaluation. Data and analysis results are passed between connected widgets, allowing workflows to be assembled and modified interactively.

In addition to its graphical interface, Orange provides a Python interface for programmatic data analysis and for extending its components.

== Software ==
Orange is free and open-source software distributed under the GNU General Public License. Earlier versions used a machine-learning core implemented primarily in C++ with Python bindings, while Orange 3 was redesigned around the Python scientific-computing ecosystem, including NumPy, SciPy, and scikit-learn. Its graphical interface is based on the Qt framework.

Orange is available for macOS, Windows, and Linux. Its functionality can be extended through separately installable add-ons for specialized analysis tasks.

== Features ==
Orange workflows are assembled on a visual canvas by connecting widgets that represent data sources, transformations, visualizations, machine-learning methods, and evaluation procedures. Widgets exchange data and other analysis objects through their connections, allowing users to build analysis pipelines without writing code.

Many visualization widgets are interactive. Selections made in one visualization can be passed to connected widgets, where the corresponding subset can be inspected or analyzed further. This supports exploratory workflows in which visualization and computational analysis are combined within the same pipeline.

== Add-ons ==
Orange can be extended through add-ons that provide widgets and data types for specialized domains. Available extensions include tools for text mining, image analysis, bioinformatics, network analysis, time series analysis, geospatial data, model explanation, spectroscopy, single-cell data analysis, and survival analysis.

Some add-ons have been described in the scientific literature. The Image Analytics add-on combines deep-learning-based image embeddings with Orange's visual workflows, while other extensions target domains such as spectroscopy and survival analysis.

== Applications and education ==
Orange has been used as a data-analysis platform in research and as a teaching environment for machine learning and data mining. Its visual workflow interface has been used in disciplines outside computer science, including geoinformatics and engineering education.

Dobesova evaluated Orange as a teaching tool for machine-learning tasks in geoinformatics and reported its use in practical exercises involving clustering and spatial data analysis. A 2026 study used Orange to teach artificial neural networks in materials engineering, emphasizing its workflow-based interface and the ability to construct machine-learning analyses without programming.

== Extensions ==
The Orange visual-programming framework has also been used as the basis for domain-specific software. OASYS (ORange SYnchrotron Suite) uses the Orange Canvas framework to provide a graphical environment for simulations and data analysis in synchrotron and X-ray optics.

scOrange extends Orange with workflows for the analysis and visualization of single-cell gene-expression data and has also been used for hands-on training in single-cell data analytics.

Quasar combines Orange with spectroscopy-specific components for interactive analysis of spectral and hyperspectral data.

== History ==
Development of Orange began in the late 1990s at the University of Ljubljana. It was initially conceived as a library of machine-learning algorithms implemented primarily in C++, with Python bindings added to provide a scripting interface.

A graphical interface was subsequently developed around a visual-programming model in which data-analysis pipelines are assembled from connected components. By the early 2000s, this approach had become a central part of Orange, alongside its Python scripting interface.

Orange 3 represented a major architectural transition. The software was rewritten around Python 3 and adopted the Python scientific-computing ecosystem, including NumPy and scikit-learn, replacing much of the earlier C++ implementation.

Subsequent development expanded Orange through domain-specific add-ons and applications, including tools for image analysis, spectroscopy, single-cell data analysis, text mining, model explanation, and other specialized uses.

== See also ==
- Comparison of machine learning software
- Visual programming language
- Data mining
