= Ivan Bratko (computer scientist) =

Slovenian computer scientist

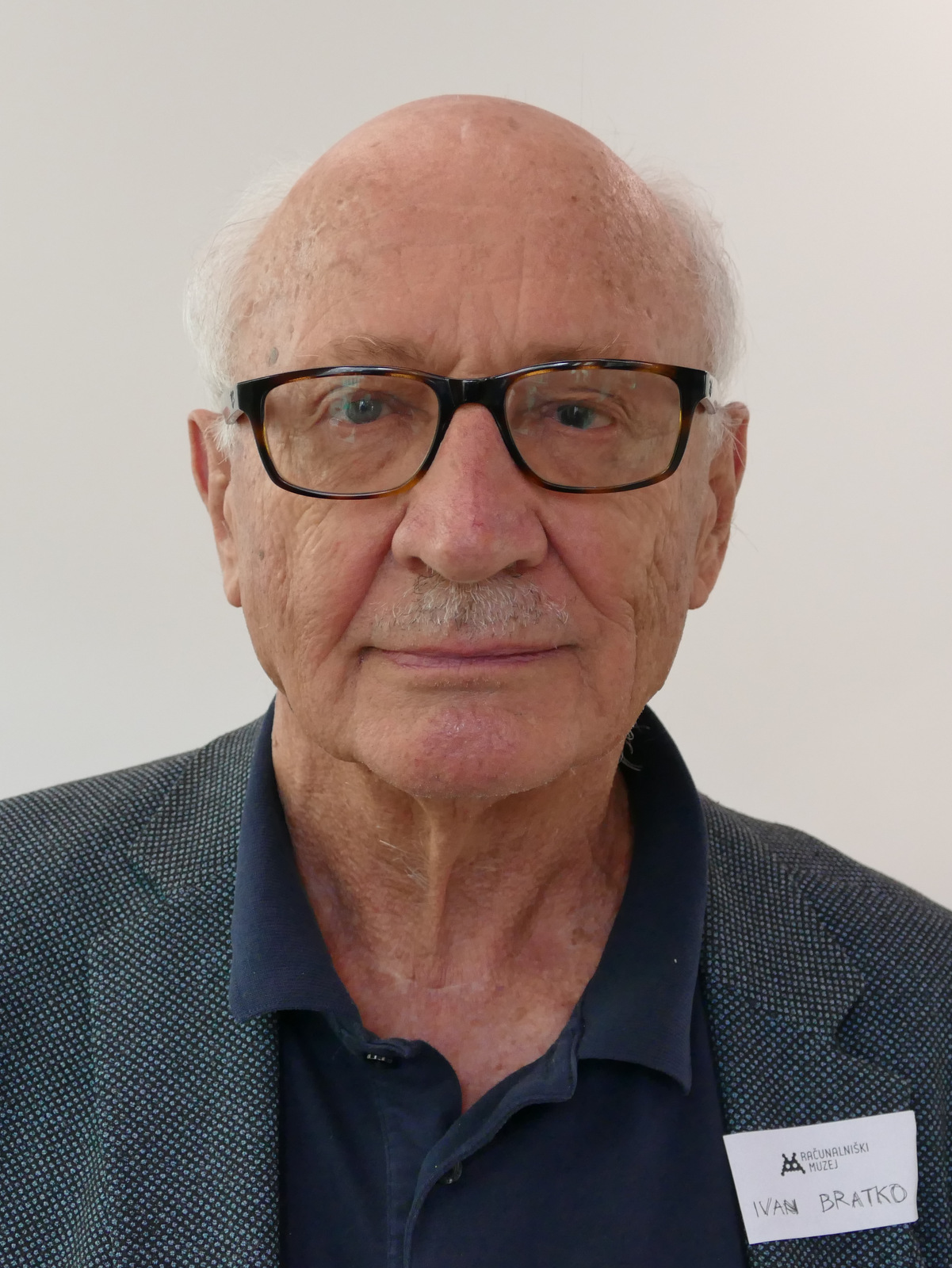
- Born: June 10, 1946 (age 80); Ljubljana, Slovenia

Academic background
- Education: University of Ljubljana (BSc, MSc) PhD)

Academic work
- Discipline: Computer science
- Sub-discipline: Artificial intelligence Machine learning
- Institutions: University of Ljubljana

Ivan Bratko (born June 10, 1946) is a Slovene computer scientist working as a D. Sc. Professor of Computer and Information Science at the Faculty of Computer and Information Science at the University of Ljubljana.

== Early life and education ==
Bratko was born in Ljubljana in 1946. He earned a Bachelor of Science in mechanical engineering, Master of Science in mechanical engineering, and PhD in computer science from the University of Ljubljana.

== Career ==
Bratko has worked as a visiting professor and scientist at the University of Edinburgh, the University of Strathclyde, the University of Sydney, the University of New South Wales, Technical University of Madrid, the University of Klagenfurt, and the Delft University of Technology. He became an associate member of the Slovenian Academy of Sciences and Arts on May 27, 1997, and he has been full member since June 12, 2003.

From 2005 to 2007 Bratko served as a member of the managing body of the Programme Council for RTV Slovenia.

He is a member of the Academia Europaea.

== Awards ==
Bratko won the Boris Kidric Foundation Award in 1985 and the Science Ambassador of the Republic of Slovenia in 1991. In 2007, he was awarded the Zois Award for outstanding scientific achievements.

In 2026, Bratko was awarded the Golden Order for Merits by the President of Slovenia, Nataša Pirc Musar.

== Bibliography ==
- Bratko, Ivan. Prolog Programming for Artificial Intelligence, 4th edition. Pearson Education / Addison-Wesley, 2012. ISBN 978-0-321-41746-6
- Bratko Ivan, Igor Mozetič, Nada Lavrač. KARDIO: A Study in Deep and Qualitative Knowledge for Expert Systems. Cambridge, Massachusetts, MIT Press, 1989. ISBN 0262022737
- Bratko, Ivan, Rajkovič, Vladislav. Računarstvo s programskim jezikom Paskal, (Biblioteka Zanimljiva nauka). Beograd: Nolit, 1986. ISBN 86-19-00914-1
