= Sonja Lapajne Oblak =

Slovenian architect (1906–1993)

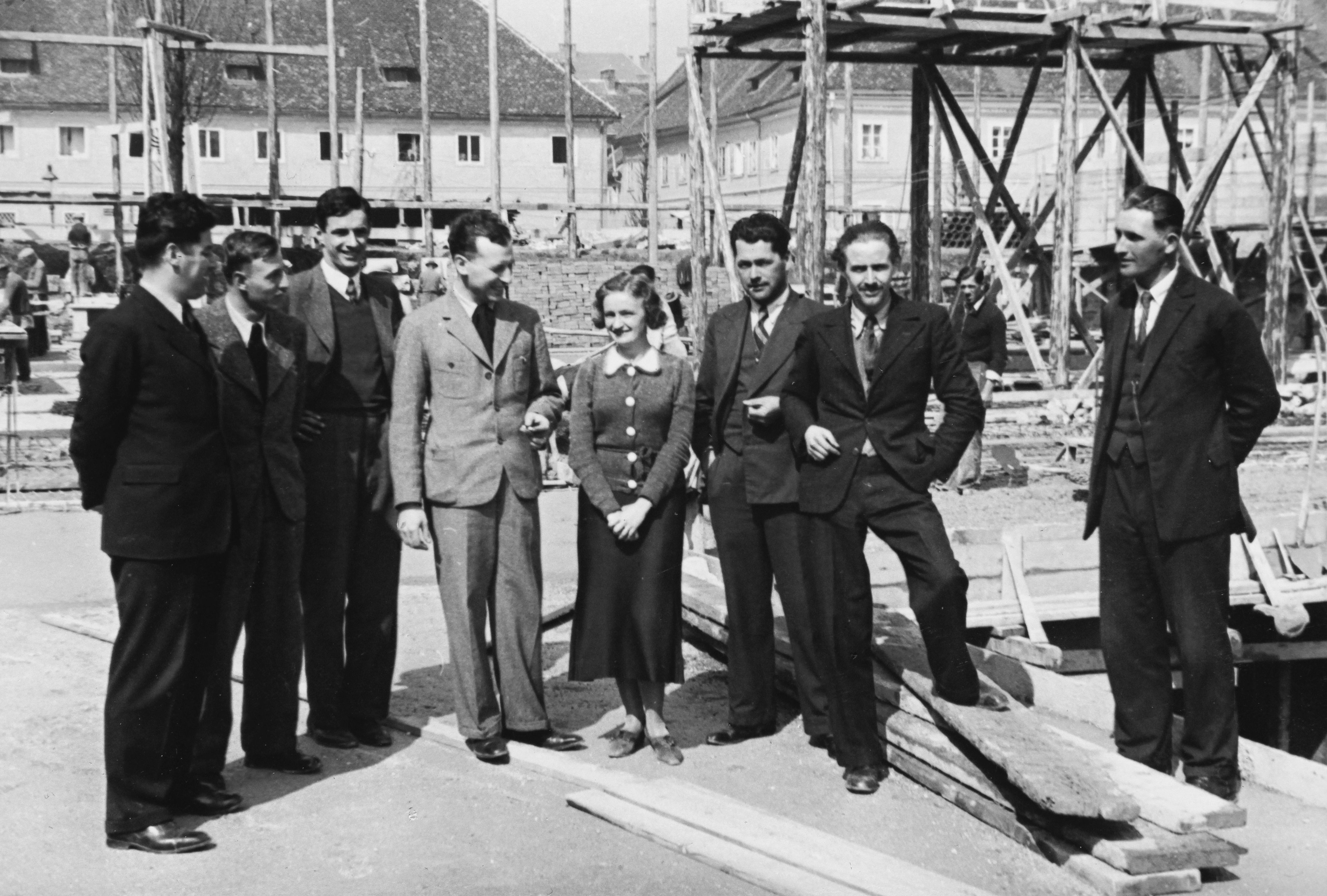
- Sonja Lapajne (centre) at the NUK construction site in Ljubljana, circa 1926
- Born: July 15, 1906; Šentvid pri Ljubljani
- Died: September 29, 1993 (aged 87); Ljubljana
- Occupations: Architect, civil engineer, urban planner, Partisan

Sonja Lapajne Oblak (July 15, 1906 – September 29, 1993) was a Slovenian architect. She was the first Slovenian woman to graduate as a civil engineer from the Faculty of Technology in Ljubljana and Slovenia's first female urban planner. She was a member of the Partisans during the Second World War, and she survived incarceration in the Ravensbruck concentration camp before playing a part in rebuilding Yugoslavia in the postwar period.

== Early life and education ==
Sonja Lapajne was born in Šentvid pri Ljubljani in 1906 and baptized Zofija-Sonja. Her parents were Antonija and Živko Lapajne, her father was a prominent medical doctor specialising in the treatment of tuberculosis and public health work, including running a hygiene institute with an interest in eugenics after the First World War.

She became the first Slovenian woman to graduate as a civil engineer from the Faculty of Technology in Ljubljana in 1932.

== Career ==
From 1934 to 1943 she worked as a structural engineer for the technical department of the royal administration of the province of Drava Banate in Ljubljana, supervising the construction of buildings planned by the state at the time. She collaborated with prominent architects of the time, Jože Plečnik, Emil Navinšek, Vinko Glanz, and Edvard Ravnikar. She calculated the world's first corridor-free, reinforced concrete school building designed by the architect Navinsek in 1936.

She worked on the static calculations for the construction of reinforced concrete buildings and supervised their creation. Buildings she worked on included Ljublijana's Gimnazija Bezigrad High School, the Gallery of Modern Art and the National and University Library, and the King Hotel in Rogaška Slatina.

== Second World War ==
In 1941 she joined the Yugoslav Partisans, a resistance movement against the Axis forces during the Second World War, led by the Communist Party of Yugoslavia (KPJ) under the leadership of Josip Broz Tito. By 1943 she was the party secretary of the Liberation Front, but she was captured and imprisoned by the Italians. After the Italian capitulation, she was interned in the German Ravensbrück concentration camp, where she remained until the end of the war.

== Postwar career ==
Lapajne Oblak became Slovenia's first female urban planner. After the war she worked in leading construction companies in Yugoslavia and as an urban planner. In the 1950s, she was involved in the development plan for the Mura Valley region in northeastern Slovenia. Until her retirement in 1969, she was the director of the Institute for Architecture, Urban Planning, and Civil Engineering in Ljubljana.

Sonja Lapajne Oblak died in 1993 in Ljubljana.

== Awards ==
- Order of Merits for the People with Golden Star (1976)
- Order of the Republic with Silver Wreath (1973)
- Order of Brotherhood and Unity, 2nd class
- Order of Labour, 2nd class
- Order of Merits for the People, 3rd class (1946)
- Commemorative Medal of the Partisans of 1941

== Commemoration ==
Sonia Lapagne Oblak featured in the exhibition To the Fore: Female Pioneers of Slovenian Architecture, Civil Engineering, and Design at the DESSA Gallery, Ljubljana in 2017.

In 2018 she was featured In the Foreground: Pioneering Women of Slovenian Architecture, Construction and Design, organised by the Slovenian Academy of Sciences, an outdoor exhibition along the promenade on the Krakov Embankment. The other 19 women featured were Darinka Battelino, Alenka Kham Pičman, Janja Lap, Dana Pajnič, Lidija Podbregar, Barbara Rot, Olga Rusanova, Erna Tomšič, Mojca Vogelnik, Vladimira Bratuž, Majda Dobravec Lajovic, Mgada Fornazarič Kocmut, Marta Ivanšek, Nives Kalin Vehovar, Juta Krulc, Seta Mušič, Dušana Šantel Kanoni, Gizela Šuklje and Branka Tancig Novak.
