= Mahila Maha Vidyalaya =

College in Banaras Hindu University

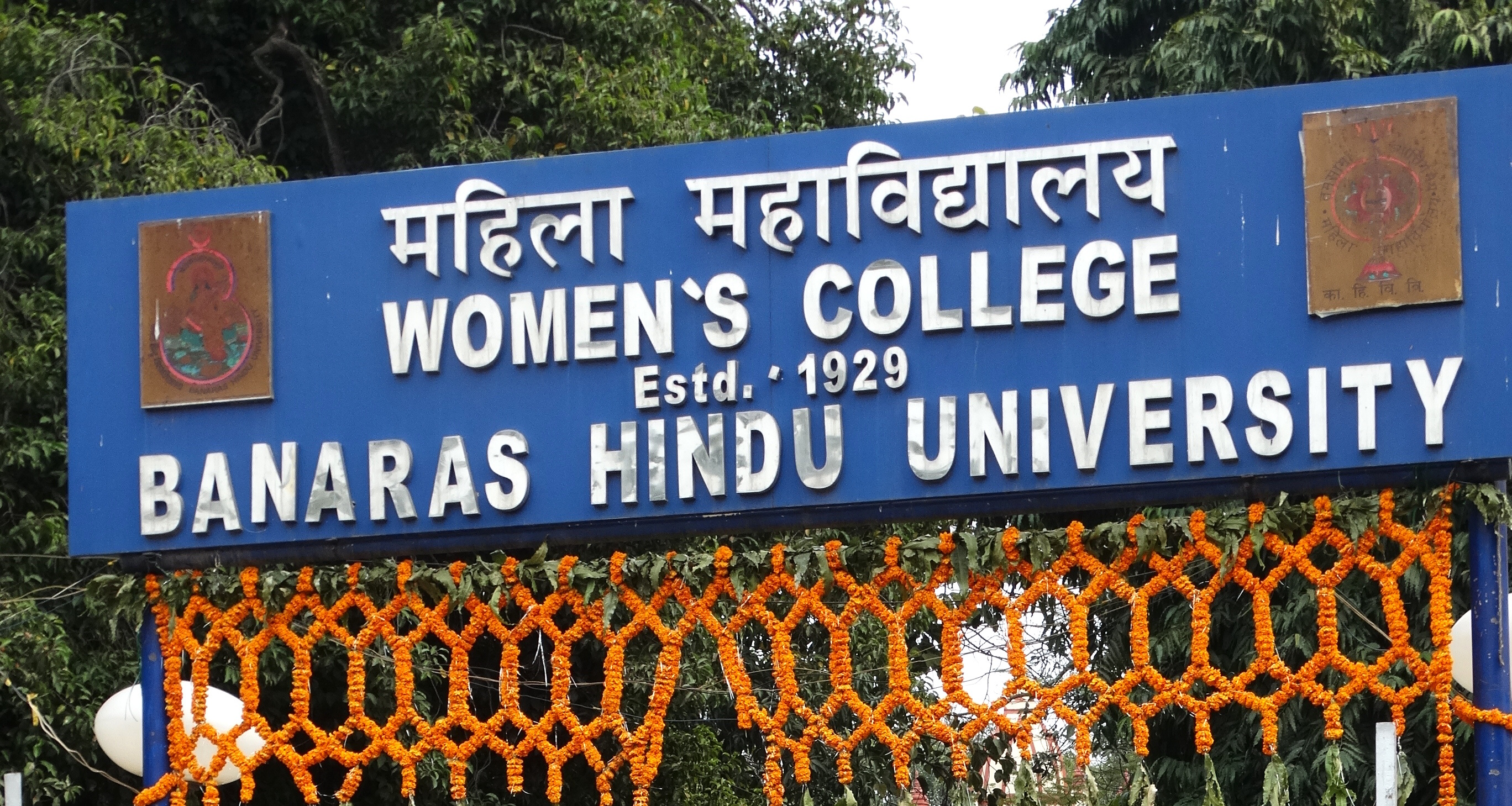
- Mahila Maha Vidyalaya
- Other name: Women's College
- Type: Public women's college
- Established: 1929
- Parent institution: Banaras Hindu University
- Academic affiliations: Banaras Hindu University
- Principal: Rita Singh
- Location: Varanasi, Uttar Pradesh, India; 25.275614°N 83.001071°E
- Campus: Urban
- Language: English & Hindi
- Website: Official website

Mahila Maha Vidyalaya (MMV), also known as Women's College, Banaras Hindu University, is a women's college in the Banaras Hindu University, Varanasi, India which offers undergraduate, postgraduate and doctoral courses in various subjects to women. It was founded in 1929 by Mahamana Pandit Madan Mohan Malaviya.

== Notable alumni ==
- Sumitra Kulkarni, Indian politician
- Vina Mazumdar, academic and founding Director of the Centre for Women's Development Studies (CWDS)
- Meenakshi Banerjee, cyanobacteriologist

== See also ==
- Banaras Hindu University
- List of educational institutions in Varanasi
