= Network analysis =

Network analysis can refer to:

- Network theory, the analysis of relations through mathematical graphs
  - Social network analysis, network theory applied to social relations
- Network analysis (electrical circuits)

== See also ==
- Network planning and design
