= Baochun Li =

Researcher and professor in computer engineering

Baochun Li from the University of Toronto, Ontario, Canada was named Fellow of the Institute of Electrical and Electronics Engineers (IEEE) in 2015 for contributions to application-layer network protocols and network coding.
