= Women's College of the University of Denver =

Colorado Women's College of The University of Denver
- Type: Private
- Established: 1908
- Affiliations: University of Denver
- Dean: Lynn Gangone
- Undergraduates: 304 (2011)
- Location: Denver, Colorado, USA; 39°40′50″N 104°57′53″W
- Campus: Urban
- Website: www.womenscollege.du.edu

Colorado Women's College (CWC) was one of eight undergraduate colleges at the University of Denver and the Rocky Mountain Region's only all-women's college. It was formerly the Colorado Women's College before merging with the University of Denver in 1982.

== History ==
The Colorado Women's College was founded in 1888 and opened its doors to its first students as a two-year college in 1909, with enrollment at 59 students its first year. Over the next ten years it changed into a four-year institution, and offered both BS and BA degrees.

The 1920s and the 1930s brought change to the campus as two more buildings, the Foote and Porter Halls, were constructed. Meanwhile, the Colorado Women's College once again became a two-year institution. In 1932, the college received accreditation by the North Central Association.

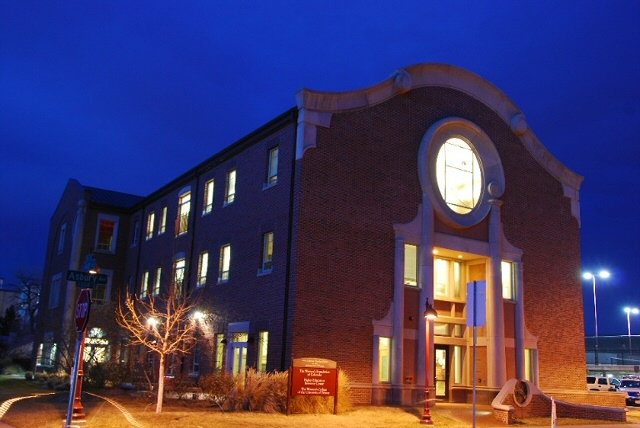
The Chambers Center

By 1967, enrollment at the Colorado Women's College reached over 1,000 students and it switched back to being a four-year institution. At around the same time the Colorado Women's College began a program targeting working women over the age of 25, which was a precursor to The Women's College of today. However, it wasn't until 1982, after a study conducted by both institutions, that the Colorado Women's College merged with the University of Denver to form The Weekend College. University of Denver housed The Weekend College on their campus as they incorporated it with their College of Business.

During the 1990s the Weekend College changed its name to its present-day name of The Women's College. This change coincided with The Women's College becoming an individual undergraduate college within the University of Denver's academic system. In 2004, it moved into the Merle Catherine Chambers Center for the Advancement of Women.

In 2015, the university ceased the college's degree-granting programs; in 2020, the college was disbanded and its remaining programs were reassigned to other university departments in the name of financial exigency.

== Merle Catherine Chambers Center for the Advancement of Women ==
Opened in 2004, the Merle Catherine Chambers Center for the Advancement of Women houses The Women's College of the University of Denver (until 2020), The Women's Foundation of Colorado, the Women in Engineering ProActive Network (WEPAN), and Higher Education Resource Services (HERS). Over 600 people contributed $9 million including a million dollar lead gift by Merle Chambers towards the construction of the center. The 32,000-square-foot (3,000 m^{2}) building has office spaces, multi-purpose meeting rooms, a technology center, and two gathering rooms to serve the needs of all the organizations.

== Academics ==
=== Bachelor degree programs ===
- Business Administration (BBA)
- Communication (BA)
- Information Technology Studies (BA)
- Law & Society (BA)

=== Minor programs ===
- Business Administration
- Communication
- Information Technology Studies
- Law & Society
- Gender and Women's Studies
- Leadership Studies

=== Certificate programs ===
- Community Based Research
- Conflict Management Studies
- Entrepreneurial Studies
- Information Technology Studies
- Gender & Women's Studies
- Leadership Studies
- Philanthropic Studies
- Writing

== Student organizations ==
- Book and Theater Club
- Lambda Pi Eta
- "Voices" Editorial Board
- Film Club
- Writer's Club
- Student Advisory Board (SAB)
- Business-Minded Women (BMW)
- DU Women in Technology (DUWIT)
- Women's Communication Network (WCN)
- Law and Society Student Association (LASSA)
- Sisterhood of Speakers (SOS)
- WebCentral TWC Online Student Community Group
- The Women's College Alumnae Association
