= List of electrical engineering journals =

List of notable electrical engineering journals

This is a list of electrical engineering journals which covers areas such as power systems, electronics, control systems, signal processing, photonics, communications, and more.

== Journals ==
- AEU: International Journal of Electronics and Communications
- Advances in Electrical and Computer Engineering
- Advances in Radio Science
- Alexandria Engineering Journal
- Applied Computational Electromagnetics Society Journal
- ACS Photonics
- Digital Signal Processing (journal)
- Energy (journal)
- Energy and Buildings
- ETransportation
- Electric Power Systems Research
- The Electrician
- Electromagnetics (journal)
- Electronics Letters
- Electronics (journal)
- Elektronika (journal)
- European Transactions on Telecommunications
- Frequenz
- Frontiers of Information Technology & Electronic Engineering
- IEEE Access
- IEEE Communications Magazine
- IEEE Electron Device Letters
- IEEE Journal of Quantum Electronics
- IEEE Journal of Selected Topics in Quantum Electronics
- IEEE Journal of Solid-State Circuits
- IEEE Journal on Flexible Electronics
- IEEE Magnetics Letters
- IEEE Microwave and Wireless Components Letters
- IEEE Photonics Journal
- IEEE Photonics Technology Letters
- IEEE Transactions on Aerospace and Electronic Systems
- IEEE Transactions on Antennas and Propagation
- IEEE Transactions on Automatic Control
- IEEE Transactions on Circuits and Systems I: Regular Papers
- IEEE Transactions on Circuits and Systems II: Express Briefs
- IEEE Transactions on Communications
- IEEE Transactions on Electromagnetic Compatibility
- IEEE Transactions on Electron Devices
- IEEE Transactions on Green Communications and Networking
- IEEE Transactions on Image Processing
- IEEE Transactions on Instrumentation and Measurement
- IEEE Transactions on Magnetics
- IEEE Transactions on Medical Imaging
- IEEE Transactions on Microwave Theory and Techniques
- IEEE Transactions on Power Electronics
- IEEE Journal on Selected Areas in Communications
- IEEE Transactions on Signal Processing
- IEEE Transactions on Terahertz Science and Technology
- IEEE Transactions on Wireless Communications
- IEEE/ACM Transactions on Networking
- IEEE Wireless Communications
- International Journal of Antennas and Propagation
- International Journal of Circuit Theory and Applications
- International Journal of Electronics
- International Journal of Numerical Modelling: Electronic Networks, Devices and Fields
- International Journal of RF and Microwave Computer-Aided Engineering
- Journal of Circuits, Systems, and Computers
- Journal of Communications
- Journal of Computational Electronics
- Journal of Electronic Imaging
- Journal of Infrared, Millimeter, and Terahertz Waves
- Journal of Lightwave Technology
- Journal of Materials Science: Materials in Electronics
- Journal of Microelectromechanical Systems
- Journal of Microwave Power and Electromagnetic Energy
- Journal of Optical Communications and Networking
- Journal of Power Sources
- Measurement Science and Technology
- Microelectronics International
- Microwave and Optical Technology Letters
- Nano Energy
- Nature Electronics
- Optical and Quantum Electronics
- Proceedings of the Institution of Electrical Engineers
- Progress in Electromagnetics Research
- Progress in Photovoltaics
- Radio Science
- Sensors (journal)
- Turkish Journal of Electrical Engineering and Computer Sciences
- Ultrasonics (journal)

== See also ==
- Electrical engineering
- Electrical engineering fields
- Institute of Electrical and Electronics Engineers
- List of electrical engineers
- List of free electronics circuit simulators and List of electrical engineering software
- List of Institution of Engineering and Technology academic journals
- List of IEEE conferences
- List of IEEE publications
- List of computer science journals
- List of engineering journals and magazines
- List of free and open-source EDA software
- List of scientific journals
- Lists of academic journals
- Timeline of electrical and electronic engineering

=== EE magazines ===
- Defense Electronics
- EDN (magazine)
- EE Times
- Electronic Design
