= List of IEEE publications =

List of publications of the Institute of Electrical and Electronics Engineers

The publications of the Institute of Electrical and Electronics Engineers (IEEE) constitute around 30% of the world literature in the electrical and electronics engineering and computer science fields, publishing well over 100 peer-reviewed journals. The content in these journals as well as the content from several hundred annual conferences are available in the IEEE's online digital library. The IEEE also publishes more than 750 conference proceedings every year. In addition, the IEEE Standards Association maintains over 1,300 standards in engineering.

Some of the journals are published in association with other societies, like the Association for Computing Machinery (ACM), the American Society of Mechanical Engineers (ASME), the Optical Society (OSA), and the Minerals, Metals & Materials Society (TMS).

== Journals ==
- IEEE Access
- Advanced Packaging, IEEE Transactions on
- Aerospace and Electronic Systems, IEEE Transactions on
- Affective Computing, IEEE Transactions on
- Antennas and Propagation, IEEE Transactions on
- Antennas and Wireless Propagation Letters, IEEE
- Applied Superconductivity, IEEE Transactions on
- Artificial Intelligence, IEEE Transactions on
- Audio and Electroacoustic, IEEE Transactions on
- Audio, Speech, and Language Processing, IEEE Transactions on
- Automatic Control, IEEE Transactions on
- Automatica Sinica, IEEE/CAA Journal of
- Automation Science and Engineering, IEEE Transactions on
- Autonomous Mental Development, IEEE Transactions on
- Big Data, IEEE Transactions on
- Biomedical and Health Informatics, IEEE Journal of
- Biomedical Circuits and Systems, IEEE Transactions on
- Biomedical Engineering, IEEE Reviews in
- Biomedical Engineering, IEEE Transactions on
- Biometrics Compendium, IEEE
- Biometrics, Behavior, and Identity Science, IEEE Transactions on
- Broadcasting, IEEE Transactions on
- Cable Television, IEEE Transactions on
- Circuits and Systems for Video Technology, IEEE Transactions on
- Circuits and Systems I: Regular Papers, IEEE Transactions on
- Circuits and Systems II: Express Briefs, IEEE Transactions on
- Circuits and Systems, IEEE Open Journal of
- Circuit Theory, IEEE Transactions on (originally named Circuit Theory, IRE Transactions on)
- Cloud Computing, IEEE Transactions on
- Cognitive and Developmental Systems, IEEE Transactions on
- Cognitive Communications and Networking, IEEE Transactions on
- Communications Letters, IEEE
- Communications, IEEE Journal on Selected Areas in
- Communications, IEEE Transactions on
- Components and Packaging Technologies, IEEE Transactions on
- Computational Biology and Bioinformatics, IEEE Transactions on
- Computational Intelligence and AI in Games, IEEE Transactions on
- Computational Social Systems, IEEE Transactions on
- Computer Architecture Letters, IEEE
- Computer-Aided Design of Integrated Circuits and Systems, IEEE Transactions on
- Computers, IEEE Transactions on
- Consumer Electronics, IEEE Transactions on
- Control Systems Technology, IEEE Transactions on
- Dependable and Secure Computing, IEEE Transactions on
- Device and Materials Reliability, IEEE Transactions on
- Dielectrics and Electrical Insulation, IEEE Transactions on
- Display Technology, Journal of
- Earth Observations and Remote Sensing, IEEE Journal of Selected Topics in Applied
- Education, IEEE Transactions on
- Electrical and Computer Engineering, Canadian Journal of
- Electromagnetic Compatibility, IEEE Transactions on
- Electromagnetic Science
- Electromagnetics, RF and Microwaves in Medicine and Biology, IEEE Journal of
- Electron Device Letters, IEEE
- Electron Devices, IEEE Transactions on
- Electronic Materials, IEEE/TMS Journal of
- Electronics Packaging Manufacturing, IEEE Transactions on
- Embedded Systems Letters, IEEE
- Emerging and Selected Topics in Circuits and Systems, IEEE Journal of
- Emerging Topics on Computing, IEEE Transactions on
- Energy Conversion, IEEE Transactions on
- Engineering Management, IEEE Transactions on
- Evolutionary Computation, IEEE Transactions on
- Flexible Electronics, IEEE Journal on
- Fuzzy Systems, IEEE Transactions on
- Games, IEEE Transactions on
- Geoscience and Remote Sensing Letters, IEEE
- Geoscience and Remote Sensing, IEEE Transactions on
- Haptics, IEEE Transactions on
- Image Processing, IEEE Transactions on
- Industrial Electronics, IEEE Transactions on
- Industrial Informatics, IEEE Transactions on
- Industry Applications, IEEE Transactions on
- Information Forensics and Security, IEEE Transactions on
- Information Technology in Biomedicine, IEEE Transactions on
- Information Theory, IEEE Transactions on
- Instrumentation and Measurement, IEEE Transactions on
- Intelligent Transportation Systems, IEEE Transactions on
- Knowledge and Data Engineering, IEEE Transactions on
- Latin America Transactions, IEEE
- Learning Technologies, IEEE Transactions on
- Lightwave Technology, Journal of
- Magnetics, IEEE Transactions on
- Magnetics Letters, IEEE
- Materials for Electron Devices, IEEE Transactions on
- Manufacturing Technology, IEEE Transactions on
- Mechatronics, IEEE/ASME Transactions on
- Medical Imaging, IEEE Transactions on
- Microelectromechanical Systems, Journal of
- Microwave and Wireless Components Letters, IEEE
- Microwave Theory and Techniques, IEEE Transactions on
- Mobile Computing, IEEE Transactions on
- Molecular, Biological and Multi-Scale Communications
- Multimedia, IEEE Transactions on
- Multiscale and Multiphysics Computational Techniques, IEEE Journal on
- Nanobioscience, IEEE Transactions on
- Nanotechnology, IEEE Transactions on
- Network and Service Management, IEEE Transactions on
- Network Science and Engineering, IEEE Transactions on
- Networking, IEEE/ACM Transactions on
- Neural Networks and Learning Systems, IEEE Transactions on
- Neural Systems and Rehabilitation Engineering, IEEE Transactions on
- Nuclear Science, IEEE Transactions on
- Oceanic Engineering, IEEE Journal of
- Optical Communications and Networking, Journal of
- Parallel and Distributed Systems, IEEE Transactions on
- Pattern Analysis and Machine Intelligence, IEEE Transactions on
- Photonics Journal, IEEE
- Photonics Technology Letters, IEEE
- Photovoltaics, IEEE Journal of
- Plasma Science, IEEE Transactions on
- Power Delivery, IEEE Transactions on
- Power Electronics Letters, IEEE
- Power Electronics, IEEE Transactions on
- Power Systems, IEEE Transactions on
- Proceedings of the IEEE
- Professional Communication, IEEE Transactions on
- Project Safety Engineering, IEEE Journal on
- Quantum Electronics, IEEE Journal of
- Quantum Electronics, IEEE Journal of Selected Topics in
- Quantum Engineering, IEEE Transactions on
- Radiation and Plasma Medical Sciences, IEEE Transactions on
- Reliability, IEEE Transactions on
- Robotics, IEEE Transactions on
- Semiconductor Manufacturing, IEEE Transactions on
- Sensors Journal, IEEE
- Services Computing, IEEE Transactions on
- Signal Processing Letters, IEEE
- Signal Processing, IEEE Journal of Selected Topics in
- Signal Processing, IEEE Transactions on
- Smart Grid, IEEE Transactions on
- Software Engineering, IEEE Transactions on
- Solid-State Circuits, IEEE Journal of
- Sustainable Energy, IEEE Transactions on
- Systems Journal, IEEE
- Systems, Man and Cybernetics, IEEE Transactions on
  - Systems, Man and Cybernetics, Part A, IEEE Transactions on
  - Systems, Man and Cybernetics, Part B, IEEE Transactions on
  - Systems, Man and Cybernetics, Part C, IEEE Transactions on
- Terahertz Science and Technology, IEEE Transactions on
- Ultrasonics, Ferroelectrics, and Frequency Control, IEEE Transactions on
- Vehicular Technology, IEEE Transactions on
- Very Large Scale Integration (VLSI) Systems, IEEE Transactions on
- Visualization and Computer Graphics, IEEE Transactions on
- Wireless Communications Letters, IEEE
- Wireless Communications, IEEE Transactions on

== Magazines ==
- Aerospace & Electronics Systems Magazine, IEEE
- Annals of the History of Computing, IEEE
- Antennas & Propagation Magazine, IEEE
- Circuits & Devices Magazine, IEEE
- Circuits and Systems Magazine, IEEE
- Communications Magazine, IEEE
- Communications Surveys and Tutorials, IEEE
- Computer
- Computer Graphics and Applications, IEEE
- Computational Intelligence magazine, IEEE
- Computing in Science & Engineering
- Consumer Electronics Magazine, IEEE
- Control Systems Magazine, IEEE
- Design & Test of Computers, IEEE
- Distributed Systems Online, IEEE
- Electrical Insulation Magazine, IEEE
- Engineering in Medicine & Biology Magazine, IEEE
- Engineering Management Review, IEEE
- Industry Applications Magazine, IEEE
- Industrial Electronics Magazine, IEEE
- Instrumentation & Measurement Magazine, IEEE
- Intelligent Systems, IEEE
- Intelligent Transportation Systems Magazine, IEEE
- Internet Computing, IEEE
- IT Professional
- Micro, IEEE
- Microwave Magazine, IEEE
- MultiMedia, IEEE
- Nanotechnology Magazine, IEEE
- Network, IEEE
- Pervasive Computing, IEEE
- Potentials, IEEE
- Pulse, IEEE
- Power & Energy Magazine, IEEE
- Robotics & Automation Magazine, IEEE
- Security & Privacy Magazine, IEEE
- Signal Processing Magazine, IEEE
- Software, IEEE
- Solid State Circuits Magazine, IEEE
- Spectrum, IEEE
- Technology & Society Magazine, IEEE
- Vehicular Technology Magazine, IEEE
- Wireless Communications, IEEE
- Women in Engineering Magazine, IEEE

== Other ==
- Communications and Networks, Journal of, by the Korean Institute of Communications Sciences (KICS) and technically cosponsored by the IEEE Communications Society

== See also ==
- Category:IEEE conferences, many with published proceedings.
- List of American Society of Mechanical Engineers academic journals
- List of American Society of Civil Engineers academic journals
- List of computer magazines and Lists of academic journals
- List of electrical engineering journals
