= Jianwei =

Jianwei is a Chinese name. Notable people with the name include:

== First name ==
- Jianwei Huang (born 1978), Chinese computer scientist

== Surname ==
- Huang Jianwei:
  - Jag Huang, or Huang Jianwei, Taiwanese actor
  - Europa Huang, or Huang Jianwei, Taiwanese singer-songwriter
  - Jianwei Huang, Chinese engineering researcher and educator
- Liu Jianwei (born 1963), Chinese novelist
- Pan Jianwei (born 1970), Chinese academic administrator and quantum physicist
- Song Jianwei (born 1992), Chinese volleyball player
- Wang Jianwei, installation artist
- Wang Jianwei (general), lieutenant general

== See also ==
- Battle of Jianwei, a battle between the contending states of Shu Han and Cao Wei
