= Kaveh Pahlavan =

- کاوه پهلوان
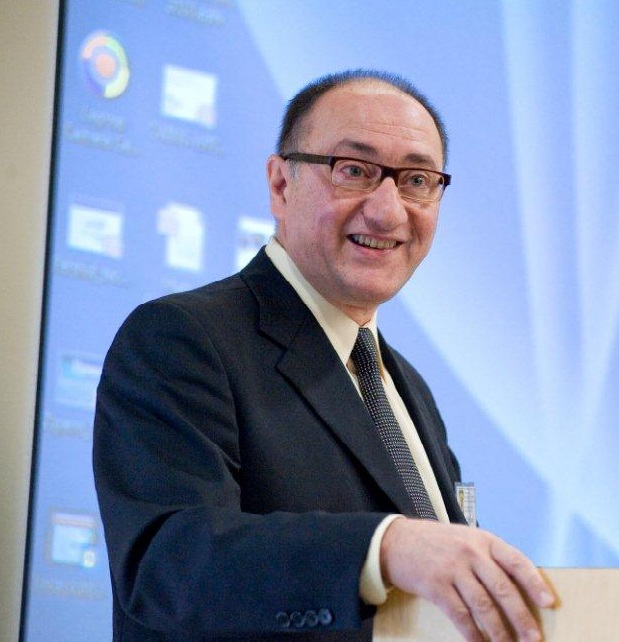
- Born: March 16, 1951; Tehran, Pahlavi Iran
- Died: November 2, 2024 (aged 73)
- Education: University of Tehran; Worcester Polytechnic Institute
- Known for: Research in Wi-Fi, Indoor Geolocation, and Body Area Network
- Scientific career
- Fields: Electrical and computer engineering, computer science, wireless networks
- Workplaces: Worcester Polytechnic Institute; University of Science and Technology Beijing, R.I. China; Skyhook Wireless, Boston; University of Oulu, Finland; Northeastern University, Boston

Kaveh Pahlavan (Persian: کاوه پهلوان born in Tehran, Pahlavi Iran), was a Professor of Electrical and Computer Engineering and Computer Science and the director of the Center for Wireless Information Network Studies (CWINS), Worcester Polytechnic Institute, Worcester, Massachusetts. Pahlavan started doing research on Wi-Fi when it was in its infancy, and has worked on wireless indoor geolocation, and Body Area Networking.

He contributed to numerous technical publications and holds a number of patents in these areas. His current area of research is opportunistic application of RF signals from wireless devices for gesture and motion detection as well as authentication and security.

== Education and career ==
Pahlavan received his BS/MS degree in electrical engineering from the University of Tehran in 1975, and his PhD degree from the Worcester Polytechnic Institute, Worcester, Massachusetts in 1979.

He began his academic career as an assistant professor at the Northeastern University, Boston, in 1979, before joining the faculty at the Worcester Polytechnic Institute (WPI) in 1985. At WPI he founded the world's first academic research program in wireless local area networks (WLAN), commercially known as Wi-Fi (1985). He has been a visiting professor at the University of Oulu, Finland (1995-2007), where he also spent his sabbatical leave in 1999. He has spent his other sabbatical leaves at Olin College and Harvard University in 2004 and 2011 respectively.

He was the chief technical adviser of Skyhook Wireless in Boston between 2004 and 2014. WINDATA was one of the pioneers in design of WLAN and Skyhook is the pioneer of Wi-Fi positioning systems. Pahlavan has also acted as a consultant to many firms in the wireless industry, including Nokia, Apple, DEC, Honeywell, Electrobit, JPL and NTT. He also led the US team for review of the National R&D Programs, sponsored by the Finnish Academy and TEKES (2000, 2003).

He was elected as a fellow of the IEEE (1996) for contributions to data communication with particular emphasis on wireless office information networks, was selected as a member of the Evolution of Untethered Communications Committee, National Research Council (1997), was the first Fulbright-Nokia scholar (2000), and was awarded the WPI's Board of Trustees' Outstanding Research and Creative Scholarship Award (2011).

Pahlavan was the founding editor-in-chief of the International Journal of Wireless Information Networks, a member of the advisory board of IEEE Wireless Communications.

== Books ==
Pahlavan co-authored several books including:

- Understanding Communications Networks – for Emerging Cybernetics Applications Forthcoming, Kaveh Pahlavan, River Publishers, the Netherlands, ISBN 978-87-7022-586-1, 978-87-7022-392-8, 612 pages, March 2021.
- Indoor Geolocation Science and Technology At the Emergence of Smart World and IoT, K. Pahlavan, River Publishers, the Netherlands, ISBN 978-87-7022-051-4, 471 pages, Hardcover, January 2019.
- Principles of Wireless Access and Localization, K. Pahlavan and P Krishnamurthy, John Wiley and Sons, ISBN 978-0-470-69708-5, 720 pages, November 2013.
- Networking Fundamentals – Personal, Local and Wide Area Communications, K. Pahlavan and P. Krishnamurthy, John Wiley and Sons, ISBN 0-470-99289-1, Hardcover, 638 pages, March 2009.
- Wireless Information Networks - 2nd Edition, K. Pahlavan and Allen H. Levesque, Wiley - Interscience, ISBN 0-471-72542-0, Hardcover, 722 pages, September 2005.
- Principles of Wireless Networks - A Unified Approach, K. Pahlavan and P. Krishnamurthy, Prentice Hall, ISBN 0-13-093003-2, Hardcover, 584 pages, January 2002.
- Wireless Information Networks, K. Pahlavan and A. Levesque, John Wiley and Sons, Hardcover, 572 pages, ISBN 0-471-10607-0, April 1995.
- R&D Programmes in Electronics and Telecommunication, ETX, TLX, INWITE and Telectronics, A. Salo, K. Pahlavan, and J.P. Salmenkaita Academy of Finland and TEKES, 2000
- Wireless Network Deployments (edited book), R. Ganesh and K. Pahlavan, Kluwer Academic Publishers, 2000
- Broadband Satellite Communications for Internet Access Sastri L. Kota, Kaveh Pahlavan, Pentti A. Leppänen, Springer, 1 edition (November 1, 2003), ISBN 1-4020-7659-2, Hardcover 456 pages
- Emerging Location Aware Broadband Wireless Ad Hoc Networks, Rajamani Ganesh, S. L. Kota, Kaveh Pahlavan, Springer, October 2004 329 pages, ISBN 0-387-23070-X
- The Evolution of Untethered Communications, K. Pahlavan (committee member), National Academy Press, 1997 (committee report), ISBN 0-309-05946-1
- Wireless Multimedia Network Technologies (edited book), R. Ganesh, K. Pahlavan and Z. Zvonar, Kluwer Academic Publisher, 1999, ISBN 0-7923-8633-7

== Personal life ==
As a student in Iran, Pahlavan played in the University of Tehran Volleyball Team, which won two Iranian National Volleyball College Championships in 1971 and 1972. In 1973, sponsored by the University of Tehran, he participated in the Summer Universiade in Moscow, where his team lost every match except those played against Soviet Union female Volleyball team. He also played for Peykan/Shahbaz Volleyball Club (1969–72), and was invited to the Iranian National Volleyball Team in 1972. In the United States he received an award in Argentine Tango Dancing with his wife (2011–present).

Pahlavan studied history, philosophy, and Persian poetry. In 2011, he managed the English translation of Behrouz Gharibpour's musical, Puppet Opera of Rumi.

== See also ==
- List of Iranian Americans
- Modern Iranian scientists, scholars, and engineers
- Worcester Polytechnic Institute
