= Boon Ooi =

Malaysian-American academic researcher

Boon S. Ooi is a Malaysian–American academic researcher. He is the Future Chip Constellation Chair Professor at Rensselaer Polytechnic Institute in Troy, New York, United States, and a Al- Khawarzmi Distinguished Professor of Electrical and Computer Engineering at King Abdullah University of Science and Technology (KAUST) in Saudi Arabia. He was faculty member at Nanyang Technological University (Singapore) from 1996 to 2000 and at Lehigh University (Pennsylvania, USA) from 2003 to 2009. He served as Director of KACST-Technology Innovation Center at KAUST from 2012 to 2020.

== Education ==
Ooi received his early education in Kedah and Penang, Malaysia, before earning his BEng and PhD degrees in electronics and electrical engineering from the University of Glasgow in Scotland, UK, in 1992 and 1995, respectively.

== Career ==
Research

His research lab focuses on the development of high-speed optoelectronics for optical fiber, and optical wireless communications. He has made significant contributions broadband emitters, and underwater photonics. Ooi has published more than 400 peer-reviewed journal papers and holds more than 40 issued US Patents. His research interests include high-speed optoelectronics, optical wireless communications, and distributed fiber optic sensors.

Professional Engagements

Ooi has served as Associate Editor of the Optics Express, Senior Editor of the IEEE Photonics Journal. Since 2022, he has been Editor-in-Chief of the IEEE Photonics Technology Letters, and an Editorial Board Member of the Proceedings of the IEEE. He has also served on IEEE Fellow Committee, IEEE Nick Holonyak, Jr. Medal for Semiconductor Optoelectronic Technologies Committee, IEEE Photonics Award Committee, SPIE Fellow Selection Committee., APS-DLS Fellowship Committee, and Chaired the IEEE Photonics Society Distinguished Lecturer Award Committee.

== Recognition ==
Ooi is the recipient of the Optica/OSA Sang Soo Lee Award, the Khalifa International Award, and several IEEE and OSA paper awards.

Ooi is a Fellow of the U.S. National Academy of Inventors (NAI), the Institute of Electrical and Electronics Engineers (IEEE), the American Physical Society (APS), the Optica, the International Society for Optics and Photonics (SPIE), and the Institute of Physics.
