= M. Saif Islam =

M. Saif Islam সাইফ ইসলাম
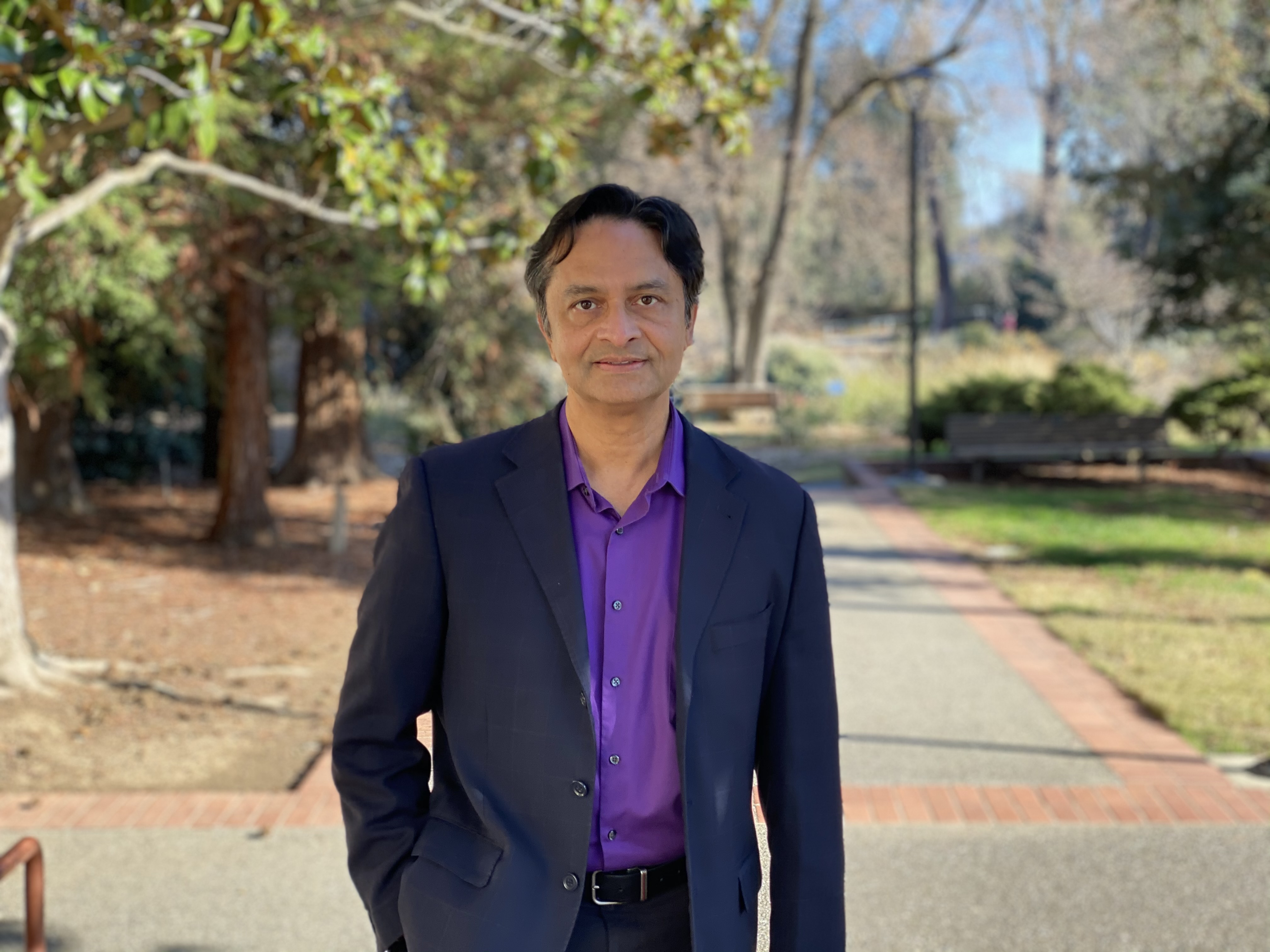

Academic background
- Education: BSc, Physics, 1994, Middle East Technical University; MSc., Physics, 1996, Bilkent University; MSc., Electrical Engineering, 1999, Ph.D., Electrical Engineering, 2001, University of California, Los Angeles
- Website: https://www.ece.ucdavis.edu/~saif/

M. Saif Islam is a Bangladeshi-American engineering professor of Electrical and Computer Engineering at the University of California, Davis.

== Early life and education ==
Islam earned his Bachelor of Science degree from Middle East Technical University and his first Master's degree from Bilkent University. Islam then traveled to the United States and received his PhD degree in Electrical Engineering from University of California, Los Angeles.

== Career ==
Upon completing his formal education, Islam remained in California and worked for the Optical Networking Research group of JDS Uniphase Corporation and the Quantum Science Research group of the Hewlett-Packard Laboratories during 2001–04. Subsequently, he accepted a faculty position at the University of California, Davis in 2004. As a professor in the Department of Electrical and Computer Engineering, Islam and his research team demonstrated the first 3D transistor array based on horizontally suspended silicon nano-bridges. He co-founded two start-up companies based on his inventions with the support of UC Davis, UC Office of the President, and Nevada Institute for Renewable Energy Commercialization (NIREC). He was elected a Fellow of the National Academy of Inventors (NAI) for his role as the co-founder of Atocera, a start-up that plans to bring its silicon surgical and razor blades to market as a less expensive alternative to ceramic and diamond blades. Atocera received Sacramento Regional Innovation Award for Advanced Manufacturing in 2018. He also demonstrated the conversion of vertically oriented light waves into an ensemble of laterally oriented collective guided light beams in semiconductor thin films by integrating a 2D periodic array of nanoscale holes and implemented such slowly propagating trapped-light to enhance photon material interaction in ultrafast and highly efficient photodetectors.

Islam has authored and co-authored more than 250 scientific papers, chaired 33 scientific conferences and symposiums sponsored by MRS, SPIE, and IEEE; and holds 42 US, and international patents as an inventor/co-inventor. He received NSF Faculty Early Career Award, Outstanding Junior Faculty Award, and Mid-Career Research Faculty Award, IEEE Professor of the Year, and the University of California, Davis Academic Senate Distinguished Teaching Award- the highest teaching honor the university bestows on its faculties.

In 2018, Islam was elected to three academic societies; the Engineering Section of the American Association for the Advancement of Science (AAAS); the Optical Society of America (OSA) and Society of Photo-Optical Instrumentation Engineers (SPIE). The following year, he was also elected to the Institute of Electrical and Electronics Engineers (IEEE) for the development of novel sensors and ultra-fast photodetectors.

Islam served as the Chair of Department of Electrical and Computer Engineering of UC Davis during 2017–20 and as the Director of the Northern California Nanotechnology Center during 2012–15. He served as an Associate Editors for IEEE Photonics Journal and IEEE Transactions on Nanotechnology. In 2020, Islam was appointed from associate editor to Senior Editor of the journal IEEE Access.
