= Jianwei Huang =

Chinese engineering researcher

- 黄建伟
- Born: 1978; 48 years ago Nanjing, Jiangsu, China
- Education: Northwestern University (MSc., PhD); Southeast University (BSc.)
- Known for: Game theory, Economics, Network Science, Wireless Network, Smart Grid
- Awards: IEEE Marconi Prize Paper Award in Wireless Communications, IEEE Fellow, Thomson Reuters Highly Cited Researcher in Computer Science
- Scientific career
- Workplaces: The Chinese University of Hong Kong, Shenzhen
- Doctoral advisor: Michael L. Honig and Randall A. Berry
- Website: jianwei.cuhk.edu.cn

Jianwei Huang (黄建伟, born 1978) is a Chinese computer scientist and electrical engineer. He is a Presidential Chair Professor and Associate Vice President (Institutional Development) of The Chinese University of Hong Kong, Shenzhen. He is also an adjunct professor in the Department of Information Engineering at the Chinese University of Hong Kong. He is a guest professor of Southeast University.

== Education and career ==
Jianwei Huang was born in 1978 in Nanjing, Jiangsu, China. He attended Nanjing Foreign Language School during 1990–1996, and served as the President of the school's Student Union in 1995. He entered Southeast University in 1996, served as the Vice President (1996–1998) and President (1999) of the university's student union, and received his Bachelor of Engineering degree from the Department of Radio Engineering in 2000. He entered the Department of Electrical Engineering & Computer Science, Northwestern University in 2001, and received the master's degree in 2003 and the Ph.D. degree in 2005.

From 2005 to 2007, he worked as a postdoctoral research associate at the Department of Electrical Engineering, Princeton University. He joined the Department of Information Engineering at the Chinese University of Hong Kong as an assistant professor in 2007, and he was promoted to associate professor in 2013 and Full Professor in 2017. He is leading the Network Communications and Economics Lab (NECL). He joined The Chinese University of Hong Kong, Shenzhen, in Jan. 2019, as a Presidential Chair Professor.

== Research ==
Huang's current research interests include both the fundamentals and the applications of network economics, including User-Provided Networks, Mobile Crowd Sensing, Mobile Data Offloading, WiFi Economics, Cognitive Radio and Dynamic Spectrum Sharing, and Smart Grid Economics.

He is the co-author of several books: "Wireless Network Pricing," "Monotonic Optimization in Communication and Networking Systems," "Cognitive Mobile Virtual Network Operator Games," "Social Cognitive Radio Networks," and "Economics of Database-Assisted Spectrum Sharing". He is the co-author of six ESI Highly Cited Papers in Computer Science. His Google Scholar citations have exceeded 13400 in July 2021.

== Honors and awards ==
Huang's paper on auction based spectrum sharing was among the Best Readings of Economics of Cognitive Radio Networks. In 2011, he received the prestige IEEE Marconi Prize Paper Award in Wireless Communications. He and his collaborators were the recipients of Best (Student) Paper Awards in many international conferences, such as IEEE WiOpt 2013/2014/2015, IEEE SmartGridComm 2012, WiCON 2011, IEEE Globecom 2010, APCC 2009.

He received the Chinese University of Hong Kong Young Researcher Award for 2014–2015 and IEEE ComSoc Asia-Pacific Outstanding Young Researcher Award in 2009. During 2015–2018, he serves as a Distinguished Lecturer of IEEE Communications Society.

At the age of 37, "for contributions to resource allocation in wireless systems", he was elevated to be an IEEE Fellow in November 2015 (Class of 2016). He is one of the youngest IEEE Fellows elevated in 2015 worldwide. In 2016 and 2017, he was selected as a Thomson Reuters Highly Cited Researcher in Computer Science.

== Services ==
Huang has served as the Editor-in-Chief of IEEE Transactions on Network Science and Engineering, an editor of IEEE Transactions on Mobile Computing, an editor of IEEE/ACM Transactions on Networking, an editor of IEEE Transactions on Cognitive Communications and Networking, an editor of IEEE Transactions on Wireless Communications, an editor of IEEE Journal on Selected Areas in Communications – Cognitive Radio Series, an editor and an associate editor-in-chief of IEEE Communications Society Technology News. He has served as a guest editor of IEEE Transactions on Smart Grid special issue on "Big Data Analytics for Grid Modernization" (2016), IEEE Network special issue on "Smart Data Pricing" (2016), IEEE Journal on Selected Areas in Communications special issues on "Game Theory for Networks" (2016), "Economics of Communication Networks and Systems" (2012), and "Game Theory in Communication Systems" (2008), and IEEE Communications Magazine feature topic on "Communications Network Economics" (2012).

Huang has served as chair (2016–2018) and vice chair (2014–2016) of IEEE Communications Society Cognitive Network Technical Committee, chair (2012–2014) and vice chair (2010–2012) of IEEE Communications Society Multimedia Communications Technical Committee, a steering committee member of IEEE Transactions on Multimedia (2012–2014) and IEEE International Conference on Multimedia & Expo (2012–2014). He has served as the Conference or Symposium TPC co-chair of IEEE ICC 2020, IEEE WiOpt 2017 and 2012, IEEE SDP 2016 and 2015, IEEE ICCC 2015 and 2012, NetGCoop 2018 and 2014, IEEE SmartGridComm 2014, IEEE GLOBECOM 2013 and 2010, IWCMC 2010, and GameNets 2009.

He is the recipient of IEEE ComSoc Multimedia Communications Technical Committee Distinguished Service Award in 2015 and IEEE GLOBECOM Outstanding Service Award in 2010.
