= Carmen Menoni =

Argentinian scientist

Carmen S. Menoni
- Born: Rosario, Santa Fe
- Education: National University of Rosario; Colorado State University
- Scientific career
- Workplaces: Colorado State University
- Thesis: The influence of pressure on germanium and indium-phosphide. (1987)

Carmen S. Menoni is an Argentine-American physicist who is the University Distinguished Professor at Colorado State University. Her research considers oxide materials for interference coatings and spectrometry imaging. She is a Fellow of the Institute of Electrical and Electronics Engineers, American Physical Society, Optica, and SPIE. Menoni served as the President of the IEEE Photonics Society from 2020 to 2021.

== Early life and education ==
Menoni is from Rosario, Santa Fe, Argentina. She became interested in mathematics and physics as a young girl. She studied electrical engineering at the National University of Rosario, where she completed an undergraduate research project with the National Atomic Energy Commission. Inspired by her introduction to materials science, Menoni decided to follow a research career with optical materials. She moved to the United States as a graduate student, where she joined Colorado State University to study structure-property relationships in Germanium and Indium phosphide.

== Research and career ==
In 1991, Menoni joined the faculty at Colorado State University as a teaching assistant. She led the National Science Foundation centre for Extreme Ultraviolet (EUV) Science and Technology with her husband, Jorge Rocca. At Colorado State Menoni investigated the physics of semiconductors and optically active materials. In the 1990s, Menoni established XUV Lasers, a spin-out company that sought to commercialize her innovations in laser science.

Menoni studied multi-layer oxide materials that can act as anti-reflective coatings for high power lasers. In 2008, she developed a table-top microscope that uses extreme ultraviolet lasers and sophisticated lasers to image nanoscale objects. The laser pulse, which had around a nanosecond duration, could image structures with a spatial resolution of ≈ 0.05 μm. This discovery resulted in Menoni winning the R&D Mag 100 Award. The anti-reflection coatings developed by Menoni were used in the LIGO gravitational wave detector. She produces the anti-reflection coatings through ion beam sputtering.

Menoni was promoted to University Distinguished Professor in 2014, and elected President of the IEEE Photonics Society in 2020.

== Awards and honors ==
- 2008 R&D 100 Award
- 2009 Elected Fellow of Optica
- 2009 Elected Fellow of the American Physical Society
- 2009 SPIE Women in Optics Planner
- 2010 Elected Fellow of the Institute of Electrical and Electronics Engineers
- 2012 Colorado State University Scholarship Impact Award
- 2014 Elected Fellow of SPIE
- 2016 Colorado State University Distinguished Alumni Employee
- 2020 Elected President of the IEEE Photonics Society
- 2024 Joseph Fraunhofer Award/Robert M. Burley Prize

== Selected publications ==
- Jing Zhu Hu; Larry D. Merkle; Carmen S. Menoni; Ian L. Spain (1 October 1986). "Crystal data for high-pressure phases of silicon". Physical Review B. 34 (7): 4679–4684. Bibcode:1986PhRvB..34.4679H. doi:10.1103/physrevb.34.4679. ISSN 0163-1829. PMID 9940261. Wikidata Q31914730.
- Matthew D Seaberg; Daniel E Adams; Ethan L Townsend; et al. (1 November 2011). "Ultrahigh 22 nm resolution coherent diffractive imaging using a desktop 13 nm high harmonic source". Optics Express. 19 (23): 22470–22479. Bibcode:2011OExpr..1922470S. doi:10.1364/oe.19.022470. ISSN 1094-4087. PMID 22109124. Wikidata Q34080699.
- Carmen S. Menoni; Jing Zhu Hu; Ian L. Spain (1 July 1986). "Germanium at high pressures". Physical Review B. 34 (1): 362–368. Bibcode:1986PhRvB..34..362M. doi:10.1103/physrevb.34.362. ISSN 0163-1829. PMID 9939270. Wikidata Q77977538.

== Personal life ==
Menoni met her husband, laser physicist Jorge J. Rocca, as an undergraduate student at the National University of Rosario.
