= Stefano Montanari =

Italian musician and conductor (born 1969)

- Born: 1969; Alfonsine, Emilia-Romagna, Italy
- Occupation: Musician
- Years active: 1995–
- Musical career
- Genres: Classical
- Instruments: Violin; keyboard
- Labels: Arts, Astrée, Bottega Discantica, Decca, Denon, Erato, Foné, Frequenz, Naïve, Oiseau Lyre, Opus 111 (it), Symphonia, Tactus, Thymallus, Virgin
- Awards: Diapason d'Or

Stefano Montanari (born 1969) is an Italian violinist, keyboardist, and conductor. Principal conductor of the Orchestra del Teatro Petruzzelli in Bari, he is a regular guest conductor at leading houses domestically and internationally, including the Vienna State Opera, Paris Opera, Bolshoi, and Royal Opera House, Covent Garden, while also continuing his activities as a soloist.

== Biography ==
Born in Alfonsine in the province of Ravenna in 1969—Montanari was 48 in June 2017—he graduated in violin and piano from the Accademia musicale di Firenze, continuing his studies there with a diploma in chamber music under the supervision of Pier Narciso Masi, followed by a diploma as a solo violinist under Carlo Chiarappa at the Conservatorio della Svizzera italiana in Lugano.

From 1995 to 2012 he was violin soloist and concertmaster with the Accademia Bizantina (it), under Ottavio Dantone. He has taught at the conservatories in Lugano, Bergamo, Cesena, Parma, Pesaro, and Piacenza, and at the Civica scuola di musica Claudio Abbado in Milan, and is author of Metodo di violino barocco (Baroque Violin Method), published by Carisch.

As conductor, he made his debut at the Vienna State Opera with The Barber of Seville, at the Royal Opera House with Così fan tutte, and at the Staatsoper Unter den Linden with Giulio Cesare. Since 2023, he has been principal conductor of the Orchestra del Teatro Petruzzelli in Bari.

== Recordings ==
Montanari has recorded with Arts, Astrée, Bottega Discantica, Decca, Denon, Erato, Foné, Frequenz, Naïve, Oiseau Lyre, Opus 111 (it), Symphonia, Tactus, Thymallus, and Virgin. His Decca album Purcell: O Solitude with Andreas Scholl and the Accademia Bizantina was nominated for a Grammy, while he won a Diapason d'Or for his recording of Corelli's Op. 5 Sonatas, as well Midems in 2007 and 2010.
