= Cincotti =

Cincotti is an Italian surname. Notable people with the name include:

- Carmen Cincotti (born 1993), American competitive eater
- Gabriella Cincotti, Italian optical engineer
- Peter Cincotti (born 1983), American singer-songwriter
