= John Choma =

John Choma may refer to:

- John Choma (professor) (died 2014), American professor of electrical engineering
- John Choma (American football) (born 1955), American football player
