= Nearest neighbor value interpolation =

Image interpolation method

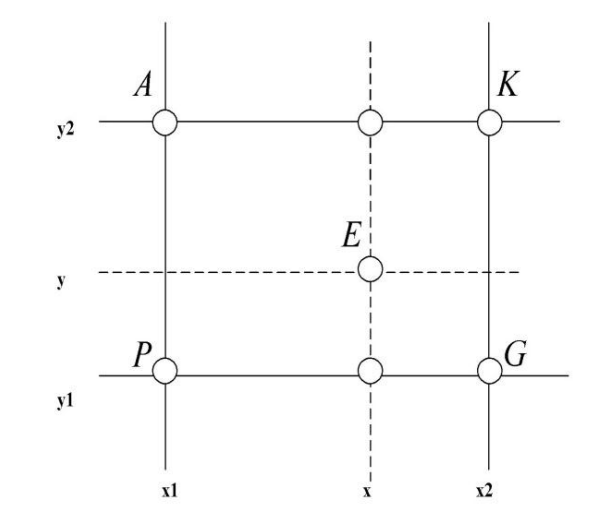
Four neighbor locations around an empty location E

In mathematics applied to computer graphics, nearest neighbor value interpolation is an advanced method of image interpolation. This method fills the empty location with pixel value corresponding to the smallest absolute difference when a set of four known pixels or neighbors has no mode.

Proposed by Olivier Rukundo in his PhD dissertation, the preliminary work presented at the fourth International Workshop on Advanced Computational Intelligence, was based only on the pixel value corresponding to the smallest absolute difference to achieve high resolution and visually pleasant image.

As of 2025, the nearest neighbor value interpolation work has been widely cited in the scientific community, with over 300 citations in Google Scholar, along over 100 citations in the Web of Science database. The method has been referenced in multiple peer-reviewed journal articles spanning fields such as image processing, signal processing, deep learning and medical imaging. Some notable studies that have cited or discussed this approach include:

- Capsule Network With Multiscale Feature Fusion for Hidden Human Activity Classification – IEEE Transactions on Instrumentation and Measurement, Vol. 72, 2023.
- Spectral Graph Learning With Core Eigenvectors Prior via Iterative GLASSO and Projection – IEEE Transactions on Signal Processing, Vol. 72, 2024.
- Learning Shape-Biased Representations for Infrared Small Target Detection – IEEE Transactions on Multimedia, Vol. 26, 2024.
- High-Resolution 3D Abdominal Segmentation With Random Patch Network Fusion – Medical Image Analysis (journal), Volume 69, April 2021.
