= Melvin M. Weiner =

American electrical engineer and inventor

- Picture of Melvin Weiner in 1969.
- Born: December 5, 1933
- Died: February 12, 2016 (aged 82)

Melvin M. Weiner (December 5, 1933 – February 12, 2016) was an American electrical engineer, scientist, author, and inventor. He authored three books and 36 refereed papers. He was also the holder of five patents. He was the first to reduce pass-bands and stop-bands in photonic crystals to practice. Weiner was the founder-chairman of the Motor Vehicle Safety Group. He was also a member and a national director of Eta Kappa Nu, the honor society of the Institute of Electrical and Electronics Engineers.

== Education ==
Weiner received S.B. and S.M. degrees with honors in electrical engineering from Massachusetts Institute of Technology. He was a member of Eta Kappa Nu, the honor society of the Institute of Electrical and Electronics Engineers. In 1969, he was elected to be a national director of Eta Kappa Nu

== Jewish life ==
Melvin Weiner was an Orthodox Jew. He would often lecture regarding his insights into the 613 commandments. He focused on their connections to the practices of the Ancient Egyptians, theorizing that many of the commandments were made in opposition to them.

== Motor Vehicle Safety Group ==
Weiner was the founder-chairman of the Motor Vehicle Safety Group contributing to the establishment of the current National Highway Traffic Safety Administration. Weiner also contributed to making the car bumper commonplace.

== Photonic crystals ==
The pass-bands and stop-bands in photonic crystals were first reduced to practice by Melvin M. Weiner who called those crystals "discrete phase-ordered media." He achieved those results by extending Darwin's dynamical theory for x-ray Bragg diffraction to arbitrary wavelengths, angles of incidence, and cases where the incident wavefront at a lattice plane is scattered appreciably in the forward-scattered direction.

== Works ==
=== Patents ===
- Solar Pumped Laser, US patent 3,297,958
- Solar Thernionic Converter US Patent 3,467,840
- Systems and Components for the Use of Electromagnetic Waves in Discrete, Phase Ordered Media US Patent 4,079,340
- Unstable Optical Resonator with Off-Axis Non-Centered Obscuration US Patent 4,079,340
- Electron Stream Deflection System, US patent 3,280,361

=== Books ===
- Monopole Elements on Circular Ground Planes
- Monopole Antennas
- Adaptive Antennas and Receivers
- Weiner also wrote chapter 4 in Progress in Electromagnetics Research (PIER 8) "Performance of Ground-Based High-Frequency Receiving Arrays with Electronically Small Ground Planes"

=== Papers ===
Weiner authored thirty-six refereed papers and one-hundred-thirty-five technical reports. Publications include:

- "Ferrite Reciprocal Phase Shift Properties (at 200–400 MHz)," Proceedings of the 1959 Electronic Components Conference, Philadelphia, p. 26, May 1959 (with K. Teragawa and W. Fitzgerald).
- "A New Method of Electronic Scanning Using a Combination Parallel Plate Transmission Line Feed," Proceedings, Electronic Scanning Symposium, Air Force Cambridge Research Center, Lexington, MA, April 29 – I May 1958 (talk given by G. Ploussios); see also "An Electronic Scanning Antenna System," AFCRC-TR-59-100 (Chu Associates, Littleton, MA), January 1959 (with G. Ploussios), NTIS AD 304191.
- "Light Gathering Properties of Optical Systems with Extended Sources," J. Opt. Soc. Amer. 54, 1109 ( 1964).
- "Propagation of the Quasi-TEM Mode in Ferrite-Filled Coaxial Line," IEEE Trans. on Microwave Theory and Techniques MTT-4, 49 (1966).
- "Directional Traffic Flow " Traffic Quarterly 20, 589 (1966).
- "Specular Reflections in Scintillation Frustums and Cylinders " IEEE Trans. of Nuclear Science NS-14, 686 (1967).
- "Transient TEM Waves in Unbounded Radial Line " Radio Science 2, 1517 (1967).
- "Atmospheric Turbulence in Optical Surveillance Systems" Applied Optics 6, 1984 (1967).
- "Differences Between the Lowest Order Mode and Quasi-TEM Mode in Ferrite-Filled Coaxial Line " Proc. of the IEEE (letter) 55, 1740 (1967).
- "Analysis of Cockcroft-Walton Voltage Multipliers with an Arbitrary Number of Stages" Rev. of Scientific Instruments 40, 330 (1969).
- "Magnetostrictive Offset .and Noise in Flux Gate Magnetometers," IEEE Trans. on Magnetics MAG-5, 98 (1969).
- "Wave Propagation in Phase-Ordered Media, " The Bridge of Eta Kappa Nu Association 67, August 3, 1971).
- "Multiple Scattering of E-M Waves in Isotropic Phase-Ordered Media," Bull. Am. Phys. Soc., Series II, 1425 (1971).
- "Bibliography of Papers, 1963–1973, Motor Vehicle Safety Group " ASME Publication 73-1CT-35, Intersociety Conference of Transportation, September 1973.
- "Useful Beam Quality Design Curves for Unstable Resonators," Opt. Eng. 13, 87 (1974).
- "Spatially Dispersive Transmission Bands at Small Grazing Angles of Incidence," Optics News, p. 23, Sept. 1975
- "Collecting Capability of An Optical System "Appl. Optics, 15, 838 (1976).
- "Fraunhofer Diffraction Patterns from Uniformly Illuminated Square Output Apertures with Non-centered Square Obscurations," Appl. Optics 15, 2228 (1976). (with G. Sutton and S. Mani)
- "Far Field Energy in the Geometric Mode Limit of Loaded Unstable Resonators with Centered or Corner Obscurations," Appl. Optics 16 1790 (1977)
- "Composite One- and Two-Pass Gain Saturation in the Geometric Mode Limit of Unstable Resonators," IEEE, J. Quantum Electronics (Letters) QE-13, 803 (1977).
- "Modes of Empty Off-Axis Unstable Resonators with Rectangular Mirrors," Appl. Optics 18, 1828 (1979)
- "Use of the Longley-Rice and Johnson-Gierhart Tropospheric Radio Propagation Programs, 0.02–20 GHz," IEEE J. of Selected Areas in Communications SAC-4, 297 (1986).
- "Monopole Element at the Center of a Circular Groundplane whose Radius is Small or Comparable to a Wavelength," IEEE Trans. on Antennas and Propagation AP-35, 488 (1987) also The Reflector 35, No. 6, 20 (1987). See also Proceedings, Progress in Electromagnetics Research Symposium (PIERS 1989) Boston, MA., July 25–26, 1989, p. 216.
- "Noise Factor of a Receiving System with Arbitrary Antenna Impedance Mismatch," IEEE Trans. on Aerospace and Electronic Systems AES-24, 1233 (1988), also MITRE Journal 1989, 191–202 (1989).
- "Tuning Stability of a Digitally-Tuned, Electrically-Short Monopole Element on Disk Groundplanes of Different Radii," J. of Electromagnetic Waves and Applications, Vol. 5, No. 11, pp. 1199–1215, (1991); also Proceedings, Progress in Electromagnetic Research Symposium (Piers 1989), Boston, MA. July 25–26, 1989, p. 217.
- "Noise Factor and Antenna Gains in the Signal/Noise Equation for Over-the-Horizon Radar," IEEE Trans. on Aerospace and Electronics Systems AES-27, No. 6, pp. 886–890 (1991); "Addendum," AES-30, No. 2, p. 648 (1994); also MITRE Journal 1992, pp. 129¬143 (1992).
- "Electrically Small, Quarter-Wave, and Resonant Monopole Elements with Disk Ground Planes in Free Space," Proceedings, Progress in Electromagnetics Research Symposium (PIERS 1991), Cambridge, MA., July 1–5, 1991, p. 690.
- "Input Impedance and Gain of Monopole Elements with Disk Ground Planes on Flat Earth" Proceedings, Progress in Electromagnetics Research Symposium (PIERS 1991), Cambridge, MA., July 1–5, 1991, p. 691 (with S. Zamoscianyk and G. J. Burke).
- "Radiation Efficiency and Input Impedance of Monopole Elements with Radial-Wire Ground Planes in Proximity to Earth," Electronics Letters, Vol. 28, No. 16, pp. 1550–1551 (1992); "Reply to J. R. Wait," Electronics Letters, Vol. 28, No. 25, p. 2329 (1992).
- "Radiation Efficiency and Directivity of Monopole Elements with Disk Ground Planes on Flat Earth," Electronics Letters, Vol. 28, No. 25, pp. 2282–2283 (1992).
- Influence of Non-Homogeneous Earth on the Performance of High-Frequency Receiving Arrays with Electrically-Small Ground Planes," Radio Science, Vol. 29, No. 1, pp. 55–71 (1994).
- "Validation of the Numerical Electromagnetic Code (NEC) for Antenna Wire Elements in Proximity to Earth," Applied Computational Electromagnetics Society Journal, Vol. 28, No. 2, pp. 44–71 (1993).
