= Don Jones (wireless health) =

American businessman

Don Jones (also known as Donald Jones) is Vice President of Global Strategy and Market Development at Qualcomm Life, and is considered a pioneer in the Wireless Health field. Jones also serves on the boards of the American Telemedicine Association, the Alliance Healthcare Foundation, and the Wireless Life Sciences Alliance, which Jones also co-founded. In 2010, Jones was named to Sanofi-Aventis Pharmaceuticals’ Consumer Products Innovations Board.

== Education ==
Jones received his bachelor's degree in Biology and Bio-Engineering from the University of California, San Diego, before going on to earn a Juris Doctor from the University of San Diego and a Master of Business Administration (MBA) from the University of California at Irvine.

== Career ==
Before joining Qualcomm to head up its Wireless Health initiative, Jones developed and grew various healthcare enterprises for 22 years. He was Chief Operating Officer of MedTrans for 8 years, and grew the company from $4.5 million to $1.2 billion, which then became American Medical Response (AMR), the world's largest emergency medical services provider. While at MedTrans, he founded EMME in 1993. EMME is a leader in pre-hospital medical care and is the largest subscription based health service in Mexico. At HealthCap, a venture capital backed startup that quickly became “the second largest provider of women’s healthcare in the United States,” he was Senior Vice President of Marketing.

In the early 1980s, Jones developed the $3 billion critical care transportation sector. In 1996, Jones led AMR into emergency physician practice management. His strategy involved the acquisition of EMCARE, the largest US emergency medicine practice. He also developed the launch of the American Medical Pathways for AMR, which won a $600 million healthcare call center contract. Jones also founded Golden Hour Data Systems, an aeromedical IT supplier.

Jones has been involved in more than 130 acquisitions, including the Medtrans and EMCARE rollups.

In 2005, Jones founded the Wireless-Life Sciences Alliance (WLSA), the world's first institute focused on accelerating the convergence of the wireless and health care industries. In this role, he started the annual Wireless Health conferences in 2010.

Jones was also named one of the Top Disruptive Forces in Health IT by Fierce Health IT in 2010.

At Qualcomm Life, Jones once led the development of wireless technologies and platforms in the health, fitness and life sciences markets.

== Honors ==
- 1998: Director of the National Highway and Transportation Safety Administration (NHTSA) asks Jones to write the EMS Implementation Guide for the Future
- 2000: Jones becomes the Journal of Emergency Medical Services’ (JEMS) One of the 20 Most Influential People in EMS
- 2010: Jones is named a Finalist in the “Biotech, Tech and Defense” division of San Diego's Top Influentials by the San Diego Source
- 2010: Jones receives the title of a “Disruptive Force in Health IT” from Fierce Health IT for his innovative outlook on the future of healthcare. Fierce Health It quotes Jones as saying, “50 percent of primary care does not have to be delivered face-to-face. Why leave your home? Why leave your desk when you don’t have to?”

== See also ==
- National Institutes of Health
- Continua Health Alliance
- Scripps Genomic Health Initiative
- The Scripps Research Institute
- Telehealth
- World Economic Forum
