= Development and Application Systems Conference =

The International Conference on DEVELOPMENT AND APPLICATION SYSTEMS (DAS) is a regional leading international academic conference organized every two years by the Faculty of Electrical Engineering and Computer Science, Ştefan cel Mare University of Suceava, Romania, attracting every edition more than 150 participants from more than 15 countries. It is normally held in May.

The aim of the Conference is to bring together scientists, engineers, manufacturers and users from all over the world in order to provide and exchange information on recent developments and future trends in systems, process control and automation, communications and computer networks, electronics and computer aided engineering, software engineering and information technology. All papers are written in English using the template provided on the website. Papers are peer reviewed by an international scientific committee using the OpenConf web-based conference management software system. All presented papers are published on-line and in the Conference Proceedings. Hard copies are distributed to authors upon arrival. Selected papers are also published in Advances in Electrical and Computer Engineering an ISI Thomson Web of Science Indexed Journal.

The International Computers Contest for Students Hard&Soft is organized in the same period as the Conference. The competition task is focused on topical areas of engineering that require a close collaboration between hardware and software designers and enable teams to demonstrate a broad spectrum of skills from hardware construction to high level software programming.

== History ==
The first DAS Conference was held in 1992, in Suceava, Romania.
