= IEEE Transactions on Network Science and Engineering =

- Discipline: Network science
- Language: English
- Edited by: Jianwei Huang

Publication details
- Publisher: IEEE Communications Society
- Frequency: Quarterly
- Impact factor: 5.033 (2021)

Standard abbreviations
- ISO 4: IEEE Trans. Netw. Sci. Eng.
- MathSciNet: IEEE Trans. Network Sci. Eng.

Indexing
- ISSN: 2327-4697

Links
- Journal homepage

IEEE Transactions on Network Science and Engineering is a quarterly peer-reviewed scientific journal published by the IEEE Communications Society. It covers the theory and applications of network science and networked systems. The editor-in-chief is Jianwei Huang (The Chinese University of Hong Kong, Shenzhen).

It is one of the highest quality and most selective journals in the field of network science. According to the Journal Citation Reports, the journal has a 2021 impact factor of 5.033.
