= Hon Ki Tsang =

Hon Ki Tsang (Chinese: 曾漢奇) is the Dean of the Faculty of Engineering of the Chinese University of Hong Kong and the Wei Lun Professor of Electronic Engineering at The Chinese university of Hong Kong. His research expertise is in photonic integrated circuits and silicon photonics.

Tsang took a gap year after graduating from high school, during which he worked for GEC Plessey Telecommunications. Tsang studied at the University of Cambridge, where he completed a bachelor's degree and doctorate, both in engineering. Upon completing his studies in 1991, Tsang became a postdoctoral researcher at the University of Bath. He returned to Hong Kong in 1993, for a lectureship at the Chinese University of Hong Kong. Three years later, Tsang was named an associate professor. Between 2002 and 2003, Tsang worked for Bookham Technology. Upon Tsang's return to academia, CUHK appointed him to a full professorship.

Tsang is a Fellow of the IEEE and the Optical Society now rebranded as Optica. He is the Editor-in-Chief of the IEEE Journal of Quantum Electronics. Tsang is also a FIDE Chess master.
