= International Journal of Wireless Information Networks =

- Discipline: Wireless networks
- Language: English

Publication details
- History: 1994-present
- Publisher: Springer Science+Business Media
- Frequency: Quarterly

Standard abbreviations
- ISO 4: Int. J. Wirel. Inf. Netw.

Indexing
- CODEN: IJWNEY
- ISSN: 1068-9605 (print); 1572-8129 (web)
- LCCN: 94641850
- OCLC no.: 27870247

Links
- Journal homepage; Online access

The International Journal of Wireless Information Networks is a quarterly peer-reviewed scientific journal covering research on wireless networks, including sensor networks, mobile ad hoc networks, wireless personal area networks, wireless LANs, indoor positioning systems, wireless health, body area networking, cyber-physical systems, and RFID techniques. The journal is abstracted and indexed in Scopus.
