= IEEE Transactions on Advanced Packaging =

- Discipline: Multi-chip modules, wafer-scale integration
- Language: English
- Edited by: Ganesh Subbarayan

Publication details
- Former names: IEEE Transactions on Components and Packaging Technologies, IEEE Transactions on Electronics Packaging Manufacturing
- History: 1999–2010
- Publisher: IEEE Components, Packaging, and Manufacturing Technology Society
- Frequency: Quarterly
- Impact factor: 1.276 (2010)

Standard abbreviations
- ISO 4: IEEE Trans. Adv. Packag.

Indexing
- CODEN: ITAPFZ
- ISSN: 1521-3323
- LCCN: 99111625
- OCLC no.: 39742480

Links
- Journal homepage

IEEE Transactions on Advanced Packaging was a quarterly peer-reviewed scientific journal published by the IEEE Components, Packaging & Manufacturing Technology Society and the IEEE Photonics Society. It covered research on the design, modeling, and applications of multi-chip modules and wafer-scale integration. It was established in 1999 and ceased publication in 2010. The last editor-in-chief was Ganesh Subbarayan (Purdue University). According to the Journal Citation Reports, the journal had a 2010 impact factor of 1.276.
