= Huang Jianwei =

Huang Jianwei or Jianwei Huang may refer to:

- Jag Huang, or Huang Jianwei, Taiwanese actor
- Europa Huang, or Huang Jianwei, Taiwanese singer-songwriter
- Jianwei Huang, Chinese engineering researcher and educator
