= John Choma (professor) =

American electrical engineer

John Choma was Professor and Chair of Electrical Engineering-Electrophysics at the University of Southern California.

Choma held B.S., M.S., and Ph.D. degrees in electrical engineering from the University of Pittsburgh. His graduate theses were:

- "Design of a Transistor Phasemeter," M.S. Thesis, University of Pittsburgh, 1965.
- "Stability Analysis of Class C Transistor Amplifiers," Ph. D. Dissertation, University of Pittsburgh, 1969.

Choma joined the USC faculty in 1980. He taught undergraduate and graduate courses in electrical circuit theory, filters, and analog integrated electronics, and advised industry in subjects relating to broadband analog and high-speed digital integrated circuit analysis, design, and modeling.

He died on August 10, 2014.

== Publications ==
Choma was the author or co-author of some several hundred journal and conference papers and the presenter of dozens of invited short courses, seminars, and tutorials. He authored or co-authored several books in the field of analog circuits and network theory, including:

- The Wiley Interscience text on electrical network theory, "Electrical Networks: Theory and Analysis"
- Co-author with Professor Wai-Kai Chen of the text "Feedback Networks: Theory and Circuit Applications"
- Co-author with Dr. Greg Rollins of the chapter 8, "Radiation Effects on Semiconductors", of "Space Communications and Nuclear Scintillation"
- An area editor of the IEEE/CRC Press Handbook of Circuits and Filters.

== Professional Society Activities ==
Professor Choma has served professional societies in the capacities of:

- The IEEE Circuits and Systems Society as a member of its Board of Governors, its Vice President for Administration, and its President
- An Associate Editor and Editor–In–Chief of the IEEE Transactions on Circuits and Systems, Part II.
- Associate Editor of the Journal of Analog Integrated Circuits and Signal Processing
- A former Regional Editor of the Journal of Circuits, Systems, and Computers.

His IEEE awards and honors include:

- Fellow, IEEE, awarded 1 January 1991 by the IEEE Circuits and Systems Society; citation reads: "For contributions to circuit analyses and the modeling of wideband analog circuits and systems"
- IEEE Prize Paper Award, awarded on 25 May 1994 by the IEEE Microwave Theory and Techniques Society for the paper (co-authored by P. C. Grossman): "Large Signal Modeling of HBT's, Including Self-Heating And Transit Time Effects,"
- IEEE Circuits and Systems Society Education Award, 1999, presented at the 1999 IEEE International Symposium On Circuits and Systems, Orlando, 1 June 1999.
- Golden Jubilee Medal, awarded 6 December 1999 by the IEEE Circuits and Systems Society; citation reads: "In recognition of outstanding contributions to the society"
- IEEE Millennium Medal, awarded 24 January 2000 by the IEEE; citation reads: "In recognition and appreciation of valued services and contributions"
- IEEE Circuits and Systems Society Meritorious Service Award, 2000, presented at the 2000 IEEE International Symposium On Circuits and Systems, Geneva, Switzerland, 30 May 2000; citation reads: "For leadership services as administrative Vice–President, President, and CAS Transactions Editor, and for contributions to CAS educational programs, including technical short courses and specialized workshops in state-of-the-art and emerging technologies."
- Editor, IEEE Transactions on Circuits and Systems, July 1995 to July 1997.
