= Paul R. Berger =

American electrical engineer

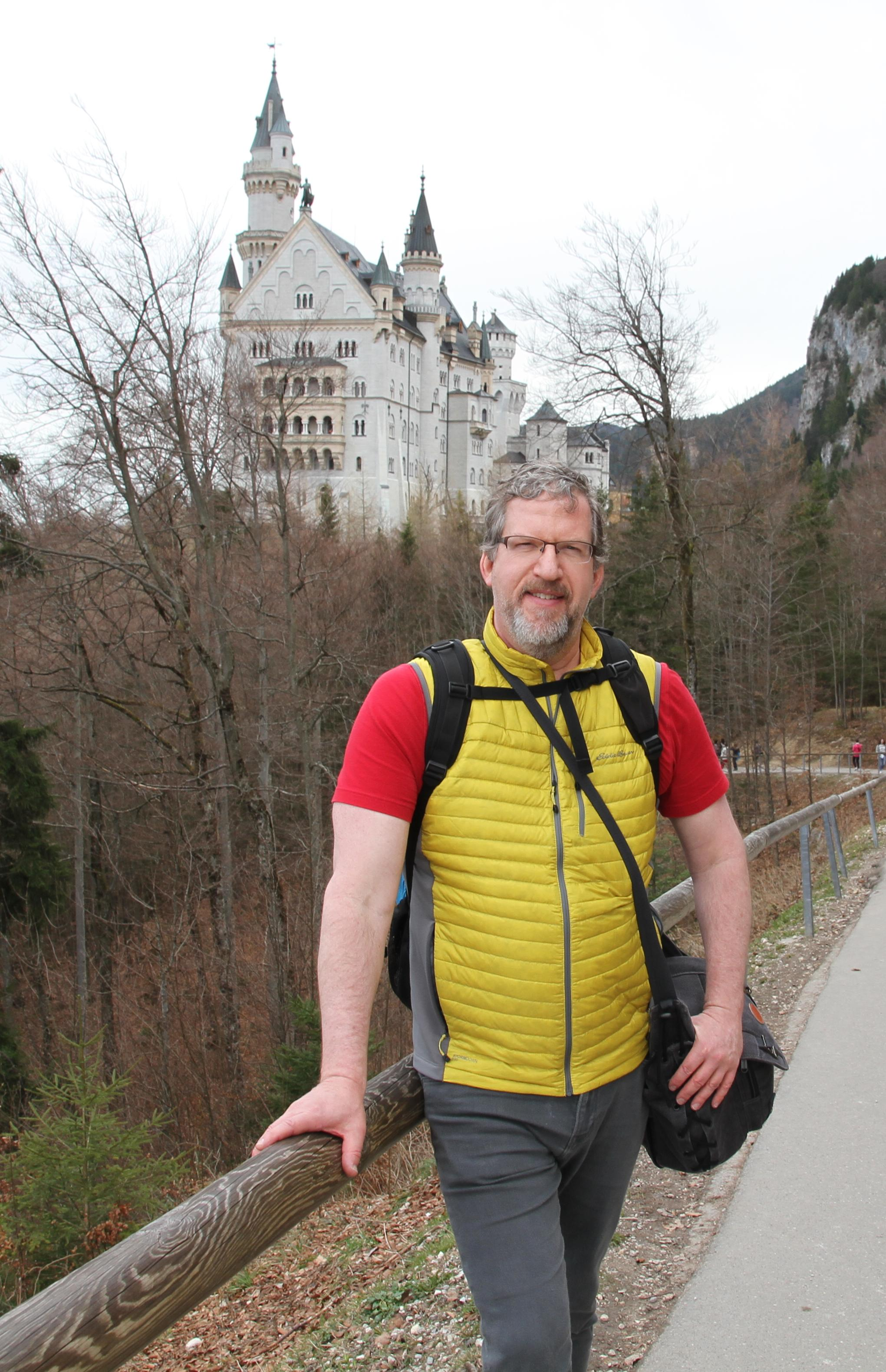
- Born: May 8, 1963 (age 63)
- Citizenship: American
- Occupation: Professor
- Known for: Self-assembled quantum dots; Quantum tunneling devices; Flexible electronics
- Title: Professor of Electrical and Computer Engineering
- Board member of: IEEE Electron Device Society; IEEE Brain; IEEE Quantum
- Awards: Fellow of the IEEE; Senior Member of The Optical Society; Member of IEEE Electron Devices Society Board of Governors

Academic background
- Education: B.S., Engineering Physics (1985); M.S., Electrical and Computer Engineering (1987); Ph.D., Electrical and Computer Engineering (1990)
- Alma mater: University of Michigan
- Thesis: Molecular Beam Epitaxy of Strained Heterostructures and their Application to Optoelectronic Devices (1990)
- Doctoral advisor: Pallab K. Bhattacharya

Academic work
- Institutions: Ohio State University
- Website: Ohio State University: Electrical and Computer Engineering

Paul R. Berger (born 8 May 1963) is a professor in electrical and computer engineering at Ohio State University and physics (by courtesy), and a distinguished visiting professor (Docent) at Tampere University in Finland, recognized for his work on self-assembled quantum dots under strained-layer epitaxy, quantum tunneling based semiconductor devices and solution processable flexible electronics.

Berger was named a Fellow of the Institute of Electrical and Electronics Engineers (IEEE) in 2011, and was elected into the IEEE Electron Devices Society board of governors in 2019. Berger was general chair of the 2021 IEEE International Flexible Electronics Technology Conference (IFETC) in August 2021, which pivoted from Columbus, Ohio to fully virtual. Also in 2021, Berger was selected as the founding editor-in-chief of the new IEEE Journal on Flexible Electronics (J-FLEX), and editor-in-chief for 2023–2024, which was renewed for 2025-2027.

Prof. Berger has also led many humanitarian engineering projects related to solar power world wide, including Haiti, Tanzania and Colombia, South America.

== Education ==
Born in Midwestern United States, but raised in the Greater Boston, Massachusetts area, Berger attended Phillips Academy in Andover,_Massachusetts. Berger received his B.S. in engineering physics, M.S in electrical and computer engineering, and Ph.D in electrical and computer engineering, all from University of Michigan, Ann Arbor campus in 1985, 1987 and 1990, respectively, under the supervision of Pallab Bhattacharya.

In 1987, Berger discovered the self-assembly of III-V semiconductor quantum dots during molecular-beam epitaxy strain engineering with Bhattacharya for the formation of high-quality quantum dot laser device manufacturing. This method has made optical communication and optical networking practical for many applications, including optical data links in enterprise networks and data centers.

== Career ==
In 1998, as part of a Quantum MOS team under a DARPA Ultra project, Berger invented Si/SiGe resonant interband tunneling diodes, the first viable Si-based negative differential resistance with the potential of being fully integrated into the mainstream Si CMOS integrated circuits technology. And in 2011, Berger was elevated to IEEE Fellow for "contributions to the understanding, development, and fabrication of silicon-based resonant interband tunneling devices and circuits."

In 1999, Berger entered the field of solution-processable flexible electronics with sabbatical visits to the Max Planck Institute for Polymer Research in Mainz, Germany and Cambridge Display Technology, then in Cambridge, England, where he generated patents on organic light-emitting diodes (OLED).

== Awards ==
- National Science Foundation CAREER Award (1996)
- DARPA ULTRA Sustained Excellence Award (1998)
- Faculty Diversity Excellence Award (2009)
- Outstanding Engineering Educator for State of Ohio (2014)
- Fulbright-Nokia Distinguished Chair in Information and Communications Technologies Award (2020),
- IEEE Region-2 Outstanding Engineering Educator Award (2023),
