= Tarek El-Bawab =

Egyptian-American engineer and academic

Tarek S. El-Bawab
- Born: Cairo, Egypt
- Education: Ain Shams University, American University in Cairo, University of Essex, Colorado State University
- Known for: Telecommunication and network engineering education; Program development; IEEE service; Academic publishing
- Notable work: Telecommunication engineering education initiative and leading the IEEE Communications Society’s movement based upon it (2008–2015); Editor-in-Chief of IEEE Communications Magazine (2017–2021)
- Honors: First recipient of the IEEE Communications Society Education Award (2015); Fellow of the IEEE (2022)
- Scientific career
- Fields: Electrical engineering, Telecommunications
- Workplaces: American University of Nigeria, Nile University, Jackson State University, Alcatel

Tarek S. El-Bawab is an Egyptian-American engineer, academic, and researcher known for his work in telecommunications and network engineering, with contributions to education, curriculum development, research, and publishing in the field. He has held leadership roles in both industry and academia in the United States, Egypt, and Nigeria. El-Bawab served in various capacities within the Institute of Electrical and Electronics Engineers, Inc. (IEEE) and the IEEE Communications Society (ComSoc), including as Editor-in-Chief of IEEE Communications Magazine from December 2017 to 2021. He is the only person to have held the editor-in-chief position for more than two terms since the magazine's founding in 1963. He is also a student of history and has addressed matters of public and societal interest in some of his publications.

== Education ==
El-Bawab earned a B.Sc. in Electrical Engineering (Communications and Electronics) and a B.A. in History from Ain Shams University in Cairo, Egypt. He completed an M.Sc. in Solid State Science at The American University in Cairo in 1989, followed by an M.Sc. in Telecommunication and Information Systems at the University of Essex in the United Kingdom in 1994. He received a Ph.D. in Electrical Engineering from Colorado State University in the United States in 1997.

== Career ==
El-Bawab spent the first part of his career in the telecommunications and transit industries before transitioning to academia in 2005. That year, he joined Jackson State University in Mississippi as an associate professor, later becoming a full professor of electrical and computer engineering. His move to Jackson State ultimately played a central role in shaping his academic contributions, particularly to telecommunication and network engineering education, their standards, and accreditation criteria. He has also been active in the academic publishing industry in recent years.

While at Jackson State, El-Bawab led an initiative to incorporate network-specific provisions into the ABET accreditation criteria for electrical, computer, and telecommunications engineering programs. This effort, supported by the IEEE Communications Society (ComSoc), contributed to revisions of the ABET (Accreditation Board for Engineering and Technology) criteria in 2015, which included updated language related to communications and telecommunications engineering. In recognition of this work, he received the inaugural IEEE Communications Society Education Award in 2015.

El-Bawab has been involved in curriculum and program development, standards education, and textbooks editorship in telecommunications and network engineering. In 2022, he was named an IEEE Fellow for his contributions to education in the field, with his elevation recommended by the IEEE Communications Society.

In 2015, El-Bawab became Editor of the series Textbooks in Telecommunication Engineering: Era of the Internet and Network Science/Engineering, published by Springer Nature. In this role, he has overseen the development of more than 40 textbooks and textbook projects, with a significant portion of this work completed between 2022 and 2025 during a period of full-time focus on the project.

From 2020 to 2022, he served as professor and founding dean of the School of Engineering at the American University of Nigeria in Yola. Prior to that, he was professor and dean of the School of Engineering and Applied Sciences at Nile University in Giza, Egypt, from 2019 to 2020.

Before his academic career, El-Bawab worked for seven years at Alcatel USA (later Alcatel-Lucent and now part of Nokia), where he served as senior research scientist and group leader at the Corporate Research Center in Plano, Texas, and later as project manager in the Network Strategy Group of the Chief Technology Officer’s Organization. Earlier in his career, he held positions in the Middle East as a field engineer, systems design engineer, and project manager.

=== IEEE ===
El-Bawab has held various leadership roles within IEEE and the IEEE Communications Society. These include serving on the IEEE Educational Activities Board (2016–2017), the IEEE Thesaurus Editorial Advisory Board (from 2021), and the ComSoc Board of Governors (2014–2015, 2018–2019, 2020–2021). He has also served as ComSoc Director of Industry Communities (2020–2021), Director of Standards Development (2018–2019), and Director of Conference Operations (2014–2015), as well as Chair of the Technical Committee on Transmission, Access, and Optical Systems (2010–2014).

== Research and publications ==
El-Bawab’s research has focused on telecommunications, optical networks, network architectures, performance analysis, electronic and photonic technologies, and discipline-based education research (DBER). He has authored over 80 scholarly publications and patents, and has led research projects in both academic and industrial settings.

From 2000 to 2008, he organized and chaired the International Workshop on Optical Networking Technologies (IWONT), held in conjunction with the IEEE International Conference on Communications (ICC) and the IEEE Global Communications Conference (GLOBECOM). He has also held leadership roles in technical conferences and delivered invited talks at international events. In 2015 and 2016, he served as a review panelist for the National Science Foundation (NSF). From 2017 to 2021, he served as Editor-in-Chief of the IEEE Communications Magazine.

== Recognitions and honors ==
In 2015, Tarek El-Bawab was named the first recipient of the IEEE Communications Society Education Award.

He served as an IEEE Distinguished Lecturer in 2016–2017 and again in 2018–2019.

In 2022, El-Bawab was elevated to the grade of Fellow of the IEEE for his contributions to telecommunications engineering education. He is also a member of IEEE-HKN (Eta Kappa Nu) and a Fellow of the Asia-Pacific Artificial Intelligence Association (AAIA).

== Selected publications ==
- Wei Jiang, Qiuheng Zhou, Jiguang He, Mohammad Asif Habibi, Sergiy Melnyk, Mohammed El-Absi, Bin Han, Marco Di Renzo, Hans Dieter Schotten, Fa-Long Luo, Tarek S. El-Bawab, Markku Juntti, Mérouane Debbah, and Victor C. M. Leung. "Terahertz communications and sensing for 6G and beyond: A comprehensive review." IEEE Communications Surveys & Tutorials 26, no. 4 (2024): 2326–2381.
- Tarek S. El-Bawab. "Network engineering versus climate change." IEEE Communications Magazine 59, no. 3 (2021): 4–5.
- Tarek S. El-Bawab. "Toward access equality: Bridging the digital divide." IEEE Communications Magazine 58, no. 12 (2020): 6–7.
- Tarek S. El-Bawab and Frank Effenberger. "Project ISTEE: Integrating standards into telecommunication engineering education, the quest to advance standards education in STEM." In 2016 IEEE Conference on Standards for Communications and Networking (CSCN), 123–128. IEEE, 2016.
- Tarek S. El-Bawab. "Telecommunication engineering education (TEE): Making the case for a new multidisciplinary undergraduate field of study." IEEE Communications Magazine 53, no. 11 (2015): 35–39.
- Frank Effenberger and Tarek S. El-Bawab. "Passive optical networks (PONs): Past, present, and future." Optical Switching and Networking 6, no. 3 (2009): 143–150.
- Tarek S. El-Bawab. Optical Switching. Springer, 2006. ISBN 978-0-387-26141-9.
- Saravut Charcranoon, Tarek S. El-Bawab, Jong-Dug Shin, and Hakki C. Cankaya. "Framework for operation and maintenance (OAM) in optical burst switched networks." Journal of Network and Systems Management 13, no. 4 (2005): 387–408.
- Anshul Agrawal, Tarek S. El-Bawab, and Lev B. Sofman. "Comparative account of bandwidth efficiency in optical burst switching and optical circuit switching networks." Photonic Network Communications 9, no. 3 (2005): 297–309.
- Tarek S. El-Bawab. "On the potential of optical switching in communication networks." In Optical Transmission Systems and Equipment for WDM Networking II, Proc. SPIE 5247 (2003): 111–114.
- Tarek S. El-Bawab and Jong-Dug Shin. "Optical packet switching in core networks: Between vision and reality." IEEE Communications Magazine 40, no. 9 (2002): 60–65.
- Tarek S. El-Bawab. "An almost-all-optical core: Motivations and candidate technologies." In Technologies, Protocols, and Services for Next-Generation Internet, Proc. SPIE 4527 (2001): 172–176.
- HyunChin Kim and Tarek S. El-Bawab. "Enhancement of node-induced crosstalk by nonlinear effects in non-zero dispersion shifted fiber rings with optical add/drop multiplexers." Fiber and Integrated Optics 20, no. 6 (2001): 625–635.
- Tarek S. El-Bawab, HyunChin Kim, and Lakshman Tamil. "Design considerations for transmission systems in optical metropolitan networks." Optical Fiber Technology 6 (2000): 213–229.
- Tarek S. El-Bawab and Anura P. Jayasumana. "Modeling and performance analysis of a symmetric fast-circuit switched robust-WDM LAN with the AR/LTP protocol." Journal of Lightwave Technology 17, no. 6 (1999): 973–988.
