= Sorin Coțofană =

Sorin Coțofană is a Quantum & Computer engineering Professor at Delft University of Technology. He was named a Fellow of the Institute of Electrical and Electronics Engineers (IEEE) in 2017 for contributions to nanocomputing architectures and paradigms.

== Education and career ==
Coțofană earned his M.Sc. degree in computer science from Politehnica University of Bucharest, Romania in 1984. He then moved to the Netherlands where he studied electrical engineering at Delft University of Technology, graduating with a Ph.D. in 1998.

From 2008 to 2014, Coțofană was an as associate editor of IEEE Transactions on Nanotechnology, during which time (from 2009 to 2011) he also worked as an associate editor for IEEE Transactions on Circuits and Systems I. In 2013, he became the IEEE Nano Council CASS representative (a position he left in 2014) as well as a member of the Nano IEEE CASS Technical Committee, which he left in 2015. In 2014 he became a member of the Steering Committee member for IEEE Transactions on Multi-Scale Computing Systems, and in 2016 he joined the IEEE Journal on Emerging and Selected Topics in Circuits and Systems Senior Editorial Board. He left the role in 2017, and then left the Steering Committee member for IEEE Transactions on Multi-Scale Computing Systems the next year. From 2019 to 2021 he was as a CASS Distinguished Lecture.
