= Petar Popovski =

Electrical engineer at Aalborg University

- Born: 1973 (age 52–53)
- Website: https://petarpopovski.es.aau.dk/

Petar Popovski is an electrical engineer at Aalborg University in Denmark. He was named a Fellow of the Institute of Electrical and Electronics Engineers (IEEE) in 2016 for his work in network coding and multiple access methods in wireless communications. He did BSc and MSc at the Ss. Cyril and Methodius University in Skopje and PhD at Aalborg University.
