= IEEE Transactions on Terahertz Science and Technology =

- Discipline: Terahertz science, technology, instruments, applications
- Language: English
- Edited by: Nuria Llombart

Publication details
- History: 2011-present
- Publisher: IEEE Microwave Theory and Techniques Society
- Frequency: Bimonthly
- Impact factor: 3.2 (2022)

Standard abbreviations
- ISO 4: IEEE Trans. Terahertz Sci. Technol.

Indexing
- CODEN: ITTSBX
- ISSN: 2156-342X
- LCCN: 2010204537
- OCLC no.: 646065946

Links
- Journal homepage; Online access; Online archive

IEEE Transactions on Terahertz Science and Technology is a bimonthly peer-reviewed scientific journal published bimonthly by IEEE. Sponsored by the IEEE Microwave Theory and Technology Society, it covers terahertz science, technology, instruments, and applications, with a focus on the frequency bands in between 300 GHz to 10 THz. Its editor-in-chief is Nuria Llombart (Delft University of Technology).

According to the Journal Citation Reports, the journal has a 2022 impact factor of 3.2.
