= Sanjay Shakkottai =

Sanjay Shakkottai is the Temple Foundation Endowed Professor No. 3 at the Department of Electrical and Computer Engineering at the University of Texas at Austin. Prior to joining the faculty at the University of Texas at Austin, Shakkottai obtained his Ph.D. in 2002 from the University of Illinois at Urbana–Champaign. He was named Fellow of the Institute of Electrical and Electronics Engineers (IEEE) in 2014 for contributions to the modeling, design, and analysis of wireless networks.
