= International Journal of Numerical Modelling: Electronic Networks, Devices and Fields =

- Discipline: Numerical modeling, electrical engineering
- Language: English
- Edited by: Giovanni Crupi

Publication details
- History: 1988–present
- Publisher: Wiley-Blackwell
- Frequency: Bimonthly
- Impact factor: 2 (2025)

Standard abbreviations
- ISO 4: Int. J. Numer. Model.: Electron. Netw. Devices Fields

Indexing
- ISSN: 0894-3370 (print); 1099-1204 (web)
- LCCN: 2001212313
- OCLC no.: 807074597

Links
- Journal homepage; Online access; Online archive

International Journal of Numerical Modelling: Electronic Networks, Devices and Fields is a peer-reviewed scientific journal published bimonthly by Wiley-Blackwell. It covers research on the applications of numerical and computational methods on electrical engineering problems, with a focus on electronic circuits and electromagnetic fields. It was established in 1988 and its editor-in-chief is Giovanni Crupi (University of Messina).

== Abstracting and indexing ==
The journal is abstracted and indexed in:

- Current Contents/Electronics & Telecommunications Collection
- Current Contents/Engineering, Computing & Technology
- EBSCO databases
- Ei Compendex
- Inspec
- ProQuest databases
- Science Citation Index Expanded
- Scopus
- Zentralblatt Math

According to the Journal Citation Reports, the journal has a 2025 impact factor of 2.
