= Gabriella Cincotti =

Italian optical engineer

Gabriella Cincotti is an Italian optical engineer whose research has included the development of photonic devices and their application in medical imaging. She is a professor of engineering at Roma Tre University, in the Department of Civil, Computer Science and Aeronautical Technologies Engineering, and the editor-in-chief of the IEEE Photonics Journal.

Cincotti was named a Fellow of the Optical Society of America (now Optica) in 2014. She was named an IEEE Fellow in 2021, "for contributions to planar photonic devices and beam diffraction in anisotropic media".
