= Wireless health =

Integration of wireless technology into traditional medicine

Wireless health is the integration of wireless technology into traditional medicine, such as diagnosis, monitoring and treatment of illness, as well as other tools that can help individuals improve their personal health and wellbeing. Wireless health differs from mHealth in that wireless health solutions will not always be mobile and mobile health solutions will not always be wirelessly enabled. Mobile broadband connectivity is useful in reaching new patients in remote areas while improving productivity and convenience through data transmission.

== Enabling Technologies ==
3G, 4G, Bluetooth low energy, and other radios such as BodyLAN (BodyLAN is a low-power wireless networking protocol that transmits data from medical and fitness devices), ANT+ (ANT+ is a wireless networking protocol that allows communication between multiple sensors and devices, designed for wireless sensor networks that require low-energy consumption and low data transmission.), Zarlink, etc.

== Examples ==
- Cardionet's 3G-enabled wireless service line, Mobile Cardiac Outpatient Telemetry (MCOT) allows for immediate arrhythmia detection.
- Dexcom makes glucose sensing technologies with an FDA-approved product that enables users to manage diabetes with real-time glucose information and trends that can detect potentially dangerous glucose levels.
- A&D makes connected activity monitors, weight scales and blood pressure monitors with software to gather and analyze personal health data.
- Entra Health Systems makes integrated bluetooth-enabled, WiFi, and Cellular blood glucose meters that work with an online data collection network to upload and report patient blood glucose readings.
- A weight management system consisting of an armband and an online Activity Manager that automatically tracks activity and sleep. Used in combination with a food log, the system provides a complete picture of the three components of weight loss: calories in, calories out and sleep quality.

== See also ==
- Mhealth
- Telehealth
- Telemedicine
- Ehealth
- West Wireless Health Institute
- Continua Health Alliance
- Don jones (wireless health)
