= IEEE MultiMedia =

- Discipline: Multimedia
- Language: English
- Edited by: Shu-Ching Chen

Publication details
- History: 1994–present
- Publisher: IEEE Computer Society
- Frequency: Quarterly
- Impact factor: 3.556 (2018)

Standard abbreviations
- ISO 4: IEEE Multimed.

Indexing
- ISSN: 1070-986X
- OCLC no.: 28524907

Links
- Journal homepage

IEEE MultiMedia is a quarterly peer-reviewed scientific journal published by the IEEE Computer Society and covering multimedia technologies. Topics of interest include image processing, video processing, audio analysis, text retrieval and understanding, data mining and analysis, and data fusion. It was established in 1994 and the current editor-in-chief is Shu-Ching Chen (Florida International University). The 2018 impact factor was 3.556.
