= Nuria Llombart =

Terahertz antenna researcher

Nuria Llombart Juan is an electrical engineer who studies quasioptics, antennas for terahertz radiation, and their applications including 3D imaging and submillimeter astronomy. Educated in Spain and Germany, she works in the Netherlands as a professor in the Department of Microelectronics at the Delft University of Technology.

== Education and career ==
Llombart earned a master's degree in 2002 and a Ph.D. in 2006 from the Technical University of Valencia, including study as a visiting student at the University of Erlangen–Nuremberg.

During her doctoral studies, she worked in the Security and Safety Institute of the Netherlands Organisation for Applied Scientific Research in The Hague. After postdoctoral research at the California Institute of Technology from 2007 until 2010, and as a Ramón y Cajal fellow in optics at the Complutense University of Madrid from 2010 until 2012, she returned to the Netherlands in 2012, taking a position at the Technical University of Delft. She became a full professor there in 2018.

== Recognition ==
Llombart was the recipient of the 2014 IEEE Antenna and Propagation Society Lot Shafai Mid-Career Distinguished Achievement Award, "for her original contributions to terahertz antennas and quasi-optical systems, academic leadership, and proven role model for women in antenna engineering". She was named an IEEE Fellow, in the 2020 class of fellows, "for contributions to millimeter and submillimeter wave quasi-optical antennas".
