= Defense Electronics =

American trade magazine

- Categories: Business magazine
- First issue: 1978 (as RF Design)
- Company: Penton Media
- Country: US
- Language: English
- Website: Defense Electronics Magazine
- ISSN: 0278-3479

Defense Electronics (formerly RF Design) is a Penton Media trade magazine that covers radio frequency design.

RF Design was started in 1978 ISSN 0163-321X and was published by Penton Media on a quarterly basis.
