= Digital Signal Processing (journal) =

Digital Signal Processing is a monthly peer-reviewed open access scientific journal covering all areas of signal processing. It as established in 1991 and published by Academic Press, now Elsevier. The editor-in-chief is Ercan E. Kuruoglu (ISTI-CNR, Pisa, Italy).

== Abstracting and indexing ==
The journal is abstracted and indexed in:

- Current Contents/Engineering, Computing & Technology
- Engineering Index Monthly
- EBSCOhost
- INSPEC
- Science Citation Index
- Scopus

According to the Journal Citation Reports, the journal has a 2014 impact factor of 1.495.
