= IEEE Design & Test =

- Language: English
- Edited by: Joerg Henkel

Publication details
- Former names: IEEE Design & Test of Computers
- History: 1984–present
- Publisher: IEEE (USA)
- Frequency: Bi-monthly
- Impact factor: 1.14 (2013)

Standard abbreviations
- ISO 4: IEEE Des. Test

Indexing
- ISSN: 2168-2356
- OCLC no.: 57216796

Links
- Journal homepage; Online access

IEEE Design & Test, or simply Design & Test, is a magazine cosponsored by the Council on EDA, Circuits and Systems Society, and the Solid State Circuits Society of the IEEE offering original works describing the models, methods and tools used to design and test microelectronic systems from devices and circuits to complete systems-on-chip and embedded software. The magazine focuses on current and near-future practice, and includes tutorials, how-to articles, and real-world case studies. The magazine seeks to bring to its readers not only important technology advances but also technology leaders, their perspectives through its columns, interviews and roundtable discussions. Topics include semiconductor IC design, semiconductor intellectual property blocks, design, verification and test technology, design for manufacturing and yield, embedded software and systems, low-power and energy efficient design, electronic design automation tools, practical technology, and standards. Technical articles are peer reviewed.

IEEE Design & Test is a bimonthly publication. It was published as IEEE Design & Test of Computers between 1984 and 2012.

The current editor is Partha Pratim Pande of Washington State University.

== See also ==
- IEEE Council on Electronic Design Automation
- Council on EDA
- Circuits and Systems Society
- IEEE Solid State Circuits Society
- IEEE Transactions on Computer-Aided Design of Integrated Circuits and Systems
