= Advances in Electrical and Computer Engineering =

- Discipline: Engineering
- Language: English
- Edited by: Adrian Graur

Publication details
- History: 2001–present
- Publisher: Ștefan cel Mare University of Suceava (Romania)
- Impact factor: 0.650 (2018)

Standard abbreviations
- ISO 4: Adv. Electr. Comput. Eng.

Indexing
- ISSN: 1582-7445 (print); 1844-7600 (web)
- OCLC no.: 909879598

Links
- Journal homepage

Advances in Electrical and Computer Engineering is a peer-reviewed scientific journal published by the Ștefan cel Mare University of Suceava since 2001. As of 2019, the editor-in-chief is Adrian Graur. The journal covers research on all aspects of electrical and computer engineering. Extended versions of selected papers presented at the Development and Application Systems Conference are published in this journal.

== Abstracting and indexing ==
The journal is abstracted and indexed in:

- Science Citation Index Expanded
- Scopus
- Inspec
- ProQuest databases
- EBSCO databases

According to the Journal Citation Reports, the journal has a 2018 impact factor of 0.650, and a 5 years impact factor of 0.639.
