= OpenConf =

- Original author(s): Robert H'obbes' Zakon
- Written in: PHP
- Type: abstract management, peer review, event management
- License: Commercial proprietary software
- Website: openconf.com

OpenConf is an abstract management and peer-review web application used extensively by conferences and journals across a wide set of industries. The software is available both for download and cloud-based, with translations in over a dozen languages for author and reviewer interfaces.

Originally developed for use by conferences only, OpenConf has been adapted for use by journals, workshops, symposia, grants and competitions, with thousands of installations in over one hundred countries.

OpenConf is available in multiple editions including Community, Plus and Pro. The Community Edition is freely available for users able to support themselves without external assistance, and as a base application for third-party research.

Developed using PHP and a MySQL database backend, the downloaded version of OpenConf may be run in various platforms, including Linux, Mac OS X, and Windows. An HTML5 compliant mobile app is also included for use by event participants accessing an event's program.

== See also ==
- Abstract management
- Academic conference
- Peer Review
