= Alexandria Engineering Journal =

- Discipline: Engineering, applied science, engineering mathematics
- Language: English
- Edited by: Nabil Abbasy

Publication details
- History: 2000–present
- Publisher: Elsevier on behalf of the Faculty of Engineering, Alexandria University
- Frequency: Monthly
- Open access: Yes
- Impact factor: 6.4 (2025)

Standard abbreviations
- ISO 4: Alex. Eng. J.

Indexing
- ISSN: 1110-0168 (print); 2090-2670 (web)
- LCCN: 90660131
- OCLC no.: 708235255

Links
- Journal homepage; Online archive

The Alexandria Engineering Journal is a peer-reviewed and open-access scientific journal that covers experimental, theoretical, and computational aspects in the field of engineering and applied science. It is published monthly by Elsevier on behalf of the Faculty of Engineering, Alexandria University. Its current the editor-in-chief is Nabil Abbasy (Alexandria University).

== Sections ==
The journal is organized in five sections:

- Chemical Engineering and Applied Sciences
- Civil and Architecture Engineering
- Electrical Engineering, Computer Science and Nuclear Engineering
- Environmental Engineering
- Mechanical, Production, Marine and Textile Engineering

== Abstracting and indexing ==
The journal is abstracted and indexed in:

- Current Contents/Engineering, Computing & Technology
- Directory of Open Access Journals
- Ei Compendex
- Inspec
- Science Citation Index Expanded

According to the Journal Citation Reports, the journal has a 2025 impact factor of 6.4. Scopus coverage of the journal was discontinued in 2026.
