= IEEE Journal of Electromagnetics, RF and Microwaves in Medicine and Biology =

- Discipline: Electromagnetics, microwave engineering, biomedical engineering
- Language: English
- Edited by: Y. X. Guo

Publication details
- History: 2017-present
- Publisher: IEEE
- Frequency: Quarterly
- Impact factor: 3.2 (2024)

Standard abbreviations
- ISO 4: IEEE J. Electromagn. RF Microw. Med. Biol.

Indexing
- ISSN: 2469-7249 (print); 2469-7257 (web)
- LCCN: 2015203420
- OCLC no.: 1368509132

Links
- Journal homepage; Online access; Online archive

IEEE Journal of Electromagnetics, RF and Microwaves in Medicine and Biology is a quarterly peer-reviewed scientific journal published by the IEEE. It was co-founded in 2017 by IEEE Microwave Theory and Technology Society, IEEE Antennas and Propagation Society and IEEE Engineering in Medicine and Biology Society. The journal covers the advances in biomedical applications of radio-frequency and microwave engineering. Its editor-in-chief is Y. X. Guo (National University of Singapore).

According to the Journal Citation Reports, the journal has a 2024 impact factor of 3.2.
