= IT Professional (journal) =

Academic journal

- Language: English
- Edited by: Irena Bojanova

Publication details
- History: 1999–present
- Publisher: IEEE Computer Society (United States)
- Frequency: Bimonthly
- Open access: No
- Impact factor: 3.7 (2019)

Standard abbreviations
- ISO 4: IT Prof.

Indexing
- ISSN: 1520-9202 (print); 1941-045X (web)

Links
- Journal homepage

IT Professional is a bi-monthly peer-reviewed magazine published by the IEEE Computer Society for the developers and managers of enterprise information systems. Coverage areas include emerging technologies, Web services, Internet security, data management, enterprise architectures and infrastructures, software development, systems integration, and wireless networks. The magazine was established in January 1999 and celebrated twenty years in 2019. IT Professional has a 2019 impact factor of 3.7.

== Editors-In-Chief ==
The following individuals are or have been editor-in-chief of the magazine:

- Irena Bojanova, 2018–2022
- San Murugesan, 2014–2017
- Simon Y. Liu, 2010–2013
- Arnold Bragg, 2006–2009
- Frank E. Ferrante, 2002–2005
- Wushow (Bill) Chou, 1999–2001
