= Microelectronics International =

- Discipline: Microelectronics
- Language: English
- Edited by: John Atkinson

Publication details
- Former name(s): Hybrid Circuits
- History: 1982-present
- Publisher: Emerald Group Publishing
- Frequency: Quarterly
- Impact factor: 0.758 (2020)

Standard abbreviations
- ISO 4: Microelectron. Int.

Indexing
- CODEN: MIINF2
- ISSN: 1356-5362
- LCCN: 97660985
- OCLC no.: 758108851

Links
- Journal homepage

Microelectronics International is a peer-reviewed scientific journal. It is published quarterly by Emerald Group Publishing, and the editor is John Atkinson. It covers research on miniaturized electronic devices, microcircuit engineering, semiconductor technology, and systems engineering. Publishing formats include original technical papers, research papers, case studies, reviews, and book reviews. The journal was established in 1982 as Hybrid Circuits (ISSN 0265-3028).

== Abstracting and indexing ==
This journal is abstracted and indexed in the following databases:

- Science Citation Index
- Current Contents/Engineering, Computing, and Technology
- Materials Science Citation Index
- Technology Research Database
- Engineering Research Database
- High Technology Research Database with Aerospace
- Materials Research Database with METADEX
- Inspec
- ProQuest Science Journals
- Recent Advances in Manufacturing Database
- Referativny Zhurnal
- Scopus
