= Junshan Zhang =

Electrical engineer

Junshan Zhang from the Arizona State University, Tempe, AZ was named Fellow of the Institute of Electrical and Electronics Engineers (IEEE) in 2012 for contributions to cross-layer optimization of wireless networks.

== Education ==
- Ph.D., electrical engineering, Purdue University, 2000
- M.S., statistics, University of Georgia, 1996
- B.S., electrical engineering, HUST – China, 1993,
