= Herbert Winful =

Ghanaian-American engineering professor (born 1952)

Herbert Graves Winful
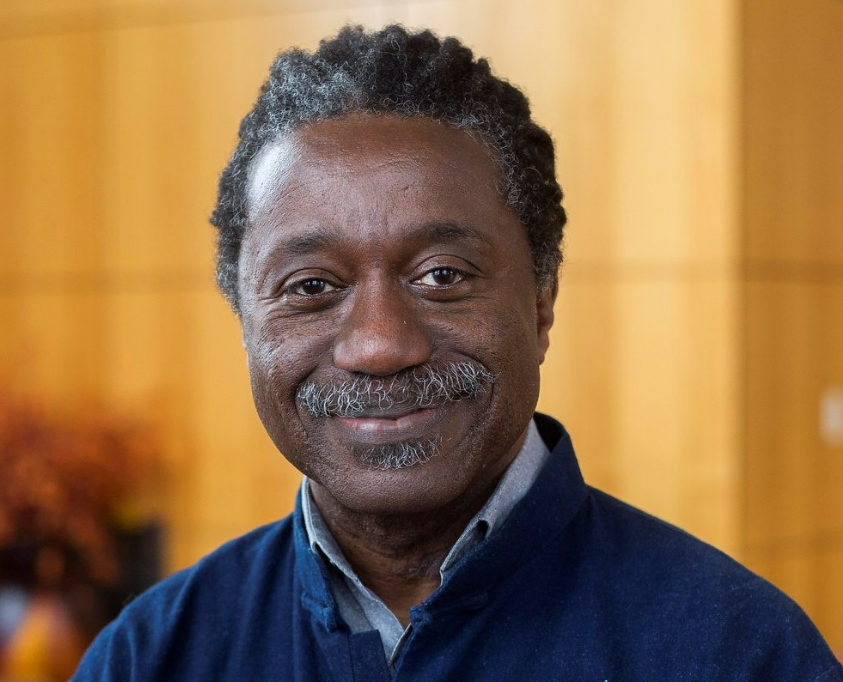
- Portrait of Herbert Winful, Professor at University of Michigan
- Born: 3 December 1952 (age 73); London, England
- Education: St Augustine's College; Massachusetts Institute of Technology (BSc); University of Southern California (MSc) (PhD)
- Employer: University of Michigan
- Awards: Quantum Electronics Award (2020)
- Scientific career
- Thesis: Optical bistability in periodic structures and in four-wave mixing processes (1980)
- Doctoral advisor: John Marburger
- Website: winful.engin.umich.edu

Herbert Graves Winful (born 3 December 1952) is a Ghanaian-American engineering professor, whose honours include in 2020 the Quantum Electronics Award. He is the Joseph E. and Anne P. Rowe Professor of Electrical Engineering, Arthur F. Thurnau Professor of Electrical Engineering and Computer Science, and a Professor of Physics at the University of Michigan.

== Early years and education ==
Winful was born in London, England, to Margaret Ferguson Graves, a teacher, and Herbert Francis, an engineer. Winful grew up in Cape Coast, Ghana, where he attended Catholic Jubilee School and St Augustine's College. In 1975 he earned a BS in electrical engineering from the Massachusetts Institute of Technology (MIT) (where he was mentored by Hermann A. Haus), followed by an M.S. in Electrical Engineering (1977) and a PhD in 1981 from the University of Southern California. His thesis was titled "Optical bistability in periodic structures and in four-wave mixing processes" and his doctoral advisor was John Marburger.

From 1980 to 1986, Winful was a Principal Member of Technical Staff at GTE Laboratories in Waltham, Massachusetts, conducting research in fiber optics and semiconductor laser physics.

== Career ==
In 1987 Winful took up the post of associate professor in the Electrical Engineering and Computer Sciences (EECS) department at the University of Michigan, and was promoted to become a full professor in 1992, then a year later promoted to an endowed professorship as Thurnau Professor.

As noted by Anis Haffar: "His many contributions to photonics and quantum electronics include pioneering work on nonlinear optical periodic structures; the nonlinear dynamics of coherently coupled laser arrays; the physics of quantum tunneling time; polarization instabilities and distributed-feedback fiber Raman lasers."

A close colleague at the University of Michigan was Gérard Mourou, who in 2018 was co-winner of the Nobel Prize in Physics for the invention of a technique known as Chirped Pulse Amplification.

Having published more than 130 journal articles and supervised the research of PhD students, Winful is himself the recipient of many awards, most recently the 2020 IEEE Photonics Society Quantum Electronics Award, which he was given "for pioneering the field of nonlinear optical periodic structures and for foundational contributions to nonlinear dynamics of semiconductor laser arrays".

Among his other distinctions are the EECS Outstanding Achievement Award, the College of Engineering Teaching Excellence and Service Excellence Awards, the Provost's Teaching Innovation Prize, the Amoco/University of Michigan Teaching Excellence Award, the State of Michigan Teaching Excellence Award, and the Raymond J. and Monica E. Schultz Outreach and Diversity Award, as well as twice voted Professor of the Year in Electrical Engineering and Computer Science, and named the Tau Beta Pi Outstanding Professor in the College of Engineering.

In January 2021, he was a recipient of the University of Michigan North Campus Deans' MLK Spirit Award, given to those "who exemplify the leadership and vision of Dr. Martin Luther King Jr."

In November 2022, Winful was inducted as a Fellow of the Ghana Academy of Arts and Sciences (GAAS).

== Family and personal life ==
Winful's mother was the headmistress of St. Michael's School in Cape Coast, and his father was a civil engineer who worked on the Akosombo Dam during its construction and later become executive secretary of the Volta River Authority.

Winful is also a musician, during his Cape Coast school days playing rhythm guitar in a pop band, as well as organ in church. He continues to play the piano recreationally — including the music of Bach, Chopin and Brahms, as well as his own compositions — and has said: "It is my greatest joy, next to my work." Winful performed one of his own original compositions at a party attended by some two hundred people in celebration of Gérard Mourou's 2018 Nobel win, and also honoured Mourou with the gift of a piece of Kente cloth.

== Selected honours and recognition ==
- Member, The Electromagnetics Academy
- Presidential Young Investigator, 1987
- Fellow, Optical Society of America, 1990
- Teaching Excellence Award, College of Engineering, 1990
- Professor of the Year, EECS Department, 1991
- State of Michigan Teaching Excellence Award, 1991
- Professor of the Year, EECS Department, 1993
- Fellow of the Institute of Electrical and Electronics Engineers, 1994
- Faculty Advisor of the Year, 1993–1994
- Tau Beta Pi Outstanding Professor Award, 1993–1994
- Amoco/University Faculty Teaching Award, 1993–1994
- Fellow of the American Physical Society, 2002
- Director for Education and Outreach for the Center for Ultrafast Optical Science (CUOS)
- Lead for University of Michigan's role in USAID's Excellence in Higher Education for Liberian Development (EHELD)
- Institute of Electrical and Electronics Engineers (IEEE) Photonics Society Quantum Electronics Award, 2020
- North Campus Deans' MLK Spirit Award, 2021
- Fellow, Ghana Academy of Arts and Sciences, 2022
- Harold R. Johnson Diversity Service Award, 2021
- College of Engineering Raymond J. and Monica E. Schultz Outreach and Diversity Award, 2021

== Publications ==
=== Selected articles ===
- (With D. T. Walton) "Passive Mode Locking with an Active Nonlinear Directional Coupler: Positive Group-Velocity Dispersion", Optics Letters, 18, 720–722 (1 May 1993).
- (With S. Feng and R. W. Hellwarth) "Gouy Shift and Temporal Reshaping of Focused Single-cycle Electromagnetic Pulses", Optics Letters., 23, 385 (1998).
- (With S. Hunsche, S. Feng, A. Leitenstorfer, E. P. Ippen, and M. C. Nuss) "Spatiotemporal Focusing of Single-cycle Light Pulses", submitted to Optics Letters (1998).
- (With S. Feng and R. W. Hellwarth) "Spatiotemporal Evolution of Single-cycle Electromagnetic Pulses", submitted to Physical Review E (1998).
- (With S. Feng) "Fields of Single-cycle Terahertz Pulses Generated by a Loop Antenna", in CLEO '98 Proceedings (May 1998).
- "Physical mechanism for apparent superluminality in barrier tunneling", in Conference on Lasers and Electro-Optics/Quantum Electronics and Laser Science Conference, Technical Digest (Optical Society of America, 2003), paper QFA5. DOI: 10.1109/QELS.2003.238281.
- Winful, Herbert G. (2005). "Apparent superluminality and the generalized Hartman effect in double-barrier tunneling". Physical Review E. 72 046608. doi:10.1103/PhysRevE.72.046608.
- Winful, Herbert G. (2006). "Tunneling time, the Hartman effect, and superluminality: A proposed resolution of an old paradox". Physics Reports. 436: 1–69. doi:10.1016/j.physrep.2006.09.002.
- Winful, Herbert G. (2003). "Nature of 'Superluminal' Barrier Tunneling". Physical Review Letters. 90 023901. doi:10.1103/PhysRevLett.90.023901.
- "Compressing light and sound through chirpedpulse stimulated brillouin scattering", Optics Infobase Conference Papers (2013).
- Winful, HG (2013). "Chirped Brillouin dynamic gratings for storing and compressing light". Opt Express. 21: 10039–47. doi:10.1364/OE.21.010039. PMID 23609709.
- Dong, Mark; Winful, Herbert G. (2016). "Unified approach to cascaded stimulated Brillouin scattering and frequency-comb generation". Physical Review A. 93 043851. arXiv:1512.06740. doi:10.1103/PhysRevA.93.043851.
