= Scripps Genomic Health Initiative =

The Scripps Genomic Health Initiative (SGHI) is a large scale study aimed at understanding how personal genetic testing influences and improves health.

Led by Dr. Eric Topol, director of the San Diego–based Scripps Translational Science Institute, the 20-year initiative will determine whether patients make an effort to improve their lifestyle and get regular checkups after learning their genetic predisposition for many common diseases. Researchers will also assess the psychological impact of genomic testing, and whether those who do it are able to prevent or delay disease by taking action after getting their results.

The study was launched in October 2008 and will follow more than 10,000 adults. A consortium of health care, technology and research leaders have joined forces in the first-of-its-kind research study, including genetic test provider Navigenics Inc., Affymetrix and Microsoft Corp.

Study participants receive a scan of their genome and a detailed analysis of their genetic risk for more than 20 health conditions that may be changed by lifestyle, including type 2 diabetes, Alzheimer's disease, heart attack, obesity, and several types of cancer.

Said Peter Neupert, corporate VP for the Health Solutions Group at Microsoft:

"Personalized medicine stands to change the way people approach their health and wellness, as well as open up new genetic research opportunities."

== See also ==
- Full Genome Sequencing
- Genetic testing
- Personal genomics
- Navigenics
- Affymetrix
- Microsoft
- Eric Topol
