= IEEE Transactions on Games =

- Discipline: Computer science
- Language: English

Publication details
- Publisher: IEEE

Standard abbreviations
- ISO 4: IEEE Trans. Games

Indexing
- ISSN: 2475-1502 (print); 2475-1510 (web)

Links
- Journal homepage

IEEE Transactions on Games is a quarterly journal of the IEEE Computational Intelligence Society that publishes peer-reviewed articles covering scientific, technical, and engineering aspects of games. The editor-in-chief is Magy Seif El-Nasr.

== History ==
The journal started as IEEE Transactions on Computational Intelligence and AI in Games in 2009, and was renamed to IEEE Transactions on Games in 2017.

== Conferences ==
The annual IEEE Conference on Games (CoG) is held in various locations around the world. In 2022, CoG was hosted in Beijing, China, through a virtual conference from 21-24 August.
