= IEEE Journal on Multiscale and Multiphysics Computational Techniques =

- Discipline: Computational electromagnetics, computational physics
- Language: English
- Edited by: Dan Jiao

Publication details
- History: 2016-present
- Publisher: Institute of Electrical and Electronics Engineers
- Frequency: Continuous
- Impact factor: 1.8 (2023)

Standard abbreviations
- ISO 4: IEEE J. Multiscale Multiphysics Comput. Tech.

Indexing
- ISSN: 2379-8793
- LCCN: 2015202300
- OCLC no.: 1368509132

Links
- Journal homepage; Online access; Online archive

IEEE Journal on Multiscale and Multiphysics Computational Techniques is a peer-reviewed scientific journal published by the Institute of Electrical and Electronics Engineers. It was co-founded in 2016 by the IEEE Microwave Theory and Technology Society, IEEE Antennas and Propagation Society, and IEEE Electromagnetic Compatibility Society. The journal covers the advances in computational electromagnetics, computational physics and applications of numerical methods in electrical engineering. Its editor-in-chief is Dan Jiao (Purdue University).

According to the Journal Citation Reports, the journal has a 2023 impact factor of 1.8.
