= Journal of Computational Electronics =

Scientific journal on numerical modeling

- Discipline: Numerical modeling, electronics engineering
- Language: English
- Edited by: Massimo V. Fischetti; Stephen Goodnick

Publication details
- History: 2002–present
- Publisher: Springer Science+Business Media
- Frequency: Bimonthly
- Impact factor: 2.1 (2024)

Standard abbreviations
- ISO 4: J. Comput. Electron.

Indexing
- ISSN: 1569-8025 (print); 1572-8137 (web)
- LCCN: 2004255476
- OCLC no.: 51062353

Links
- Journal homepage; Online access; Online archive

Journal of Computational Electronics is a peer-reviewed scientific journal published bimonthly by Springer Science+Business Media. It covers research on the applications of numerical and computational methods on electronics engineering problems, including those related to device simulation in photonics, VLSI, MEMS and microwave engineering. It was established in 2002 and its editors-in-chief are Massimo V. Fischetti (University of Texas at Dallas) and Stephen Goodnick (Arizona State University).

== Abstracting and indexing ==
The journal is abstracted and indexed in:

- Current Contents/Electronics & Telecommunications Collection
- Current Contents/Engineering, Computing & Technology
- EBSCO databases
- Ei Compendex
- Inspec
- ProQuest databases
- Science Citation Index Expanded
- Scopus

According to the Journal Citation Reports, the journal has a 2024 impact factor of 2.1.
