= IEEE Journal on Flexible Electronics =

Scientific journal

- Discipline: Semiconductors Materials and Devices, Sensors, Circuits
- Language: English
- Edited by: Paul R. Berger

Publication details
- History: 2022–present
- Publisher: IEEE Sensors Council, IEEE Electron Devices Society, and IEEE Circuits and Systems
- Frequency: Monthly
- Open access: Hybrid

Standard abbreviations
- ISO 4: IEEE J. Flex. Electron.

Indexing
- ISSN: 2768-167X
- OCLC no.: 1250384560

Links
- Journal homepage; Online access

The IEEE Journal on Flexible Electronics is a monthly peer-reviewed scientific journal covering research on sensors, electronic devices, and circuits. It is published by the IEEE Sensors Council, IEEE Electron Device Society, and IEEE Circuits and Systems. The founding editors-in-chief were Paul R. Berger (Ohio State University and Tampere University) and Ravinder Dahiya (Northeastern University). Since 2023 Berger is sole editor.

== Abstracting and indexing ==
The journal is abstracted and indexed in:

- Ei Compendex,
- Inspec,
- Scopus
