= Journal of Circuits, Systems, and Computers =

- Discipline: Engineering, Computer science
- Language: English
- Edited by: Wai-Kai Chen

Publication details
- History: 1991
- Publisher: World Scientific (Singapore)
- Frequency: 8/year

Standard abbreviations
- ISO 4: J. Circuits Syst. Comput.

Indexing
- ISSN: 0218-1266 (print); 1793-6454 (web)

Links
- Journal homepage

The Journal of Circuits, Systems and Computers was founded in 1991 and is published eight times annually by World Scientific. It covers a wide range of topics regarding circuits, systems and computers, from basic mathematics to engineering and design.

The editor-in-chief of the journal is Professor Wai-Kai Chen and the five regional editors include Piero Malcovati from the University of Pavia, Emre Salman from Stony Brook University, Masazaku Sengoku from Niigata University, Zoran Stamenkovic from IHP GmbH, and Tongquan Wei from East China Normal University.

== Abstracting and indexing ==
The journal is abstracted and indexed in:

- SciSearch
- Scopus
- ISI Alerting Services
- Current Contents/Engineering, Computing & Technology
- Mathematical Reviews
- Inspec
- io-port.net
- Compendex
- Computer Abstracts
