= IEEE Journal on Selected Areas in Communications =

- Discipline: Telecommunication
- Language: English
- Edited by: Petar Popovski

Publication details
- History: 1983-present
- Publisher: Institute of Electrical and Electronics Engineers
- Frequency: Monthly
- Impact factor: 13.081 (2021)

Standard abbreviations
- ISO 4: IEEE J. Sel. Areas Commun.

Indexing
- CODEN: ISACEM
- ISSN: 0733-8716
- LCCN: 83643067
- OCLC no.: 311074712

Links
- Journal homepage; Online access

The IEEE Journal on Selected Areas in Communications is a monthly peer-reviewed scientific journal published by the IEEE Communications Society that focuses on telecommunications. The journal was established in 1983 and the editor-in-chief is Petar Popovski (Aalborg University). According to the Journal Citation Reports, the journal has a 2021 impact factor of 13.081.
