= IEEE Transactions on Wireless Communications =

- Discipline: Wireless communications
- Language: English
- Edited by: Junshan Zhang

Publication details
- History: 2002–present
- Publisher: Institute of Electrical and Electronics Engineers
- Frequency: Monthly
- Impact factor: 10.4 (2022)

Standard abbreviations
- ISO 4: IEEE Trans. Wirel. Commun.

Indexing
- CODEN: ITWCAX
- ISSN: 1536-1276 (print); 1558-2248 (web)
- LCCN: 2001211742
- OCLC no.: 47360896

Links
- Journal homepage; Online access

IEEE Transactions on Wireless Communications is a monthly peer-reviewed scientific journal published by the IEEE Communications Society. It covers all areas of wireless communication systems and networks. It was established in 2002 and its editor-in-chief is Junshan Zhang (Arizona State University).

According to the Journal Citation Reports, the journal has a 2022 impact factor of 10.4.
