= IEEE Journal of Selected Topics in Quantum Electronics =

- Discipline: Quantum electronics
- Language: English
- Edited by: José Capmany

Publication details
- History: 1995-present
- Publisher: IEEE Photonics Society
- Frequency: Bimonthly
- Impact factor: 5.4 (2024)

Standard abbreviations
- ISO 4: IEEE J. Sel. Top. Quantum Electron.

Indexing
- ISSN: 1077-260X
- OCLC no.: 30748662

Links
- Journal homepage; Online access

The IEEE Journal of Selected Topics in Quantum Electronics is a bimonthly peer-reviewed scientific journal published by the IEEE Photonics Society. It covers research on quantum electronics. The editor-in-chief is José Capmany (Universitat Politècnica de València). According to the Journal Citation Reports, the journal has a 2024 impact factor of 5.1.

== See also ==
- IEEE Journal of Quantum Electronics
