= IEEE Transactions on Circuits and Systems I: Regular Papers =

- Discipline: Electrical and electronic engineering
- Language: English
- Edited by: Jose M. de la Rosa

Publication details
- History: 1952–present
- Publisher: IEEE Circuits and Systems Society
- Frequency: Monthly
- Impact factor: 5.1 (2022)

Standard abbreviations
- ISO 4: IEEE Trans. Circuits Syst. I: Regul. Pap.

Indexing
- ISSN: 1549-8328 (print); 1558-0806 (web)
- LCCN: 2004242052
- OCLC no.: 499768034

Links
- Journal homepage; Online access; Online archive

IEEE Transactions on Circuits and Systems I: Regular Papers (sometimes abbreviated IEEE TCAS-I) is a monthly peer-reviewed scientific journal covering the theory, analysis, design, and practical implementations of electrical and electronic circuits, and the application of circuit techniques to systems and to signal processing. It is published by the IEEE Circuits and Systems Society. The journal was established in 1952 and the editor-in-chief is Jose M. de la Rosa (Instituto de Microelectrónica de Sevilla).

According to the Journal Citation Reports, the 2022 impact factor of the journal is 5.1.

== Title history ==
Adapted from IEEE Xplore.

- 1992–2003: IEEE Transactions on Circuits and Systems I: Fundamental Theory and Applications
- 1974–1991: IEEE Transactions on Circuits and Systems
- 1963–1973: IEEE Transactions on Circuit Theory
- 1954–1962: IRE Transactions on Circuit Theory
- 1952–1954: Transactions of the IRE Professional Group on Circuit Theory

== Editors-in-chief ==
The following people are or have been editor-in-chief:

- 2024-present: Jose M. de la Rosa (Instituto de Microelectrónica de Sevilla)
- 2020–2023: Weisheng Zhao (Beihang University)
- 2015–2019: Andreas Demosthenous (University College London)
- 2014–2015: Shanthi Pavan (Indian Institute of Technology)
- 2012–2013: Gabriele Manganaro (MediaTek)
- 2010–2011: Wouter A. Serdijn (Delft University of Technology)
- 2008–2009: Gianluca Setti (University of Ferrara)
- 2006–2007: Sankar Basu (National Science Foundation)
- 2004–2005: Keshab K. Parhi (University of Minnesota)
- 2001–2003: Tamás Roska (SZTAKI)
- 1999–2001: M.N.S. Swamy (Concordia University)
- 1997–1999: Pier Paolo Civalleri (Politecnico di Torino)
- 1995–1997: Josef Nossek (Technical University of Munich)
- 1993–1995: Martin Hasler (EPFL)
- 1991–1993: Wai-Kai Chen (University of Illinois)
