= IEEE/ACM Transactions on Networking =

- Discipline: Communication networks
- Language: English
- Edited by: Eytan Modiano

Publication details
- History: 1993–present
- Publisher: Institute of Electrical and Electronics Engineers and Association for Computing Machinery
- Frequency: Bimonthly
- Impact factor: 3.7 (2022)

Standard abbreviations
- ISO 4: IEEE/ACM Trans. Netw.

Indexing
- CODEN: IEANEP
- ISSN: 1063-6692 (print); 1558-2566 (web)
- LCCN: 93648908
- OCLC no.: 26108948

Links
- Journal homepage; Online access

IEEE/ACM Transactions on Networking is a bimonthly peer-reviewed scientific journal covering communication networks. It is published by the IEEE Communications Society, the IEEE Computer Society, and the ACM Special Interest Group on Data Communications. The current editor-in-chief is Sanjay Shakkottai (University of Texas). The previous editor-in-chief was Ness B. Shroff (Ohio State University). According to the Journal Citation Reports, the journal had a 2016 impact factor of 3.376.
