= Applied Computational Electromagnetics Society Journal =

The Applied Computational Electromagnetics Society Journal
- Discipline: Computational electromagnetics
- Language: English
- Edited by: Sami Barmada, Atef Elsherbeni

Publication details
- History: 1986–present
- Publisher: Applied Computational Electromagnetics Society, River Publishers
- Frequency: Monthly
- Open access: Yes
- Impact factor: 2.2 (2025)

Standard abbreviations
- ISO 4: Appl. Comput. Electromagn. Soc. J.

Indexing
- ISSN: 1054-4887 (print); 1943-5711 (web)
- LCCN: 2008201993
- OCLC no.: 1269198196

Links
- Journal homepage; Online access; Online archive

The Applied Computational Electromagnetics Society Journal, also known as ACES Journal, is a peer-reviewed open access scientific journal published monthly by The Applied Computational Electromagnetics Society and River Publishers. It covers fundamental and applied research on computational electromagnetics. It was established in 1986 and its editors-in-chief are Sami Barmada (University of Pisa) and Atef Elsherbeni (Colorado School of Mines).

== Abstracting and indexing ==
The journal is abstracted and indexed in:

- Current Contents/Electronics & Telecommunications Collection
- Current Contents/Engineering, Computing & Technology
- EBSCO databases
- Ei Compendex
- ProQuest databases
- Science Citation Index Expanded
- Scopus

According to the Journal Citation Reports, the journal has a 2025 impact factor of 2.2.
