= Frequenz =

- Discipline: Radio-frequency and microwave engineering, terahertz technology
- Language: English
- Edited by: Rolf Jakoby

Publication details
- History: 1947–present
- Publisher: De Gruyter
- Frequency: Monthly
- Impact factor: 0.9 (2025)

Standard abbreviations
- ISO 4: Frequenz

Indexing
- ISSN: 0016-1136 (print); 2191-6349 (web)
- LCCN: 2009251218
- OCLC no.: 320960523

Links
- Journal homepage; Online access; Online archive

Frequenz (German for "frequency") is a monthly peer-reviewed scientific journal published by De Gruyter. Established in 1947, it covers fundamental and applied research in radio-frequency engineering, microwave engineering and terahertz technology, as well as wireless communications. Its editor-in-chief is Rolf Jakoby (Technische Universität Darmstadt).

== Abstracting and indexing ==
The journal is abstracted and indexed in:

- Ei Compendex
- Inspec
- ProQuest databases
- Science Citation Index Expanded
- Scopus

According to the Journal Citation Reports, the journal has a 2025 impact factor of 0.9.
