= Journal of Microelectromechanical Systems =

Peer-reviewed scientific journal

- Discipline: MEMS, microtechnology
- Language: English
- Edited by: Gianluca Piazza

Publication details
- History: 1992-present
- Publisher: IEEE
- Frequency: Bimonthly
- Impact factor: 3.1 (2022)

Standard abbreviations
- ISO 4: J. Microelectromechanical Syst.

Indexing
- CODEN: JMIYET
- ISSN: 1057-7157 (print); 1941-0158 (web)
- LCCN: 92642366
- OCLC no.: 67166539

Links
- Journal homepage; Online access; Online archive

Journal of Microelectromechanical Systems is a peer-reviewed scientific journal published bimonthly by IEEE. It covers advances in MEMS and related microtechnologies. Published under the joint sponsorship of IEEE Electron Devices Society, IEEE Industrial Electronics Society, and IEEE Robotics and Automation Society, its editor-in-chief is Gianluca Piazza (Carnegie Mellon University).

== Abstracting and indexing ==
The journal is abstracted and indexed in:

- Current Contents/Engineering, Computing & Technology
- Ei Compendex
- Inspec
- ProQuest databases
- Science Citation Index Expanded
- Scopus

According to the Journal Citation Reports, the journal has a 2024 impact factor of 3.1.
