= IEEE Photonics Society =

Society in the US

The IEEE Photonics Society, formerly the IEEE Lasers and Electro-Optics Society (LEOS), is a society of the Institute of Electrical and Electronics Engineers (IEEE), focused on the scientific and engineering knowledge about the field of quantum electronics. In the hierarchy of IEEE, the Photonics Society is one of the close to 40 technical societies organized under the IEEE Technical Activities Board.

== Field of Interest ==
The society's website states that its Field of Interest "shall be lasers, optical devices, optical fibers, and associated lightwave technology and their applications in systems and subsystems in which quantum electronic devices are key elements. The society is concerned with the research, development, design, manufacture, and applications of materials, devices and systems, and with the various scientific and technological activities which contribute to the useful expansion of the field of quantum electronics and applications".

The Society supports publications, sponsors meetings, and other forms of information exchange.

== History ==
The foundation of the society was made in 1965 by establishing the IEEE Quantum Electronics Council (QEC). In 1977, under the leadership of Henry Kressel, the council became the IEEE Quantum Electronics and Applications Society (QEAS). On January 1, 1985, the society was renamed into IEEE Lasers and Electro-Optics Society (LEOS). On April 9, 2009, the society was again renamed, now into IEEE Photonics Society.

== Publications ==
The IEEE Photonics Society publishes a broad range of peer-reviewed publications, including:

- IEEE Journal of Quantum Electronics
- IEEE Journal of Selected Topics in Quantum Electronics
- IEEE/OSA Journal of Lightwave Technology, in conjunction with the Optical Society of America
- IEEE Photonics Technology Letters

== Awards ==
The Quantum Electronics Award is presented annually at the IEEE Photonics Conference to an individual to honour outstanding contributions to quantum electronics, in either or both of the fields of fundamental research or application. Established in 1978, the award consists of an honorarium of $4000 and a medal. Notable recent recipients have included Govind P. Agrawal (2012), Robert W. Boyd (2014), Richard M. Osgood Jr. (2015), Luigi Lugiato (2019) and Herbert Winful (2020).

== See also ==
- Optoelectronics
- SPIE
- List of physics awards
- IEEE Photonics Society
