= IEEE Transactions on Nanotechnology =

- Discipline: Nanotechnology
- Language: English
- Edited by: Sorin Coțofană

Publication details
- History: 2002—present
- Publisher: IEEE
- Impact factor: 2.5 (2024)

Standard abbreviations
- ISO 4: IEEE Trans. Nanotechnol.

Indexing
- CODEN: ITNECU
- ISSN: 1536-125X (print); 1941-0085 (web)
- LCCN: 1144849326
- OCLC no.: 2002227103

Links
- Journal homepage; Online access; Online archive

IEEE Transactions on Nanotechnology is a peer-reviewed scientific journal published by IEEE. Sponsored by IEEE Nanotechnology Council, the journal covers physical basis and engineering applications in nanotechnology. Its editor-in-chief is Sorin Coțofană (Delft University of Technology).

According to the Journal Citation Reports, the journal has a 2024 impact factor of 2.5.
