= IEEE Wireless Communications =

Scientific journal

- Discipline: Wireless, Mobile telephony
- Language: English
- Edited by: Yi Qian

Publication details
- History: 2002-present
- Publisher: IEEE Communications Society
- Frequency: Bimonthly
- Impact factor: 11.979 (2020)

Standard abbreviations
- ISO 4: IEEE Wirel. Commun.

Indexing
- CODEN: IWCEAS
- ISSN: 1536-1284
- LCCN: 2001211743
- OCLC no.: 424000866

Links
- Journal homepage; Online access

IEEE Wireless Communications is a bimonthly scientific journal published by the IEEE Communications Society. Papers highlight such topics as portable telephones, communicating palmtop computers, protocols, messaging, communications, and personalized traffic filtering. It also covers such policy issues as spectrum allocation, industry structure, and technology evolution.

The current editor is Yi Qian of University of Nebraska–Lincoln, USA. It is abstracted and indexed in most of the major bibliographic databases. According to the Journal Citation Reports, the journal has a 2020 impact factor of 11.979.
