= IEEE Transactions on Instrumentation and Measurement =

- Discipline: Electronic instrumentation and measurement techniques
- Language: English
- Edited by: Roberto Ferrero

Publication details
- Former names: IRE Transactions on Instrumentation; Transactions of the IRE Professional Group on Instrumentation
- History: 1963-present
- Publisher: IEEE Instrumentation and Measurement Society
- Frequency: Monthly
- Impact factor: 7 (2025)

Standard abbreviations
- ISO 4: IEEE Trans. Instrum. Meas.

Indexing
- CODEN: IEIMAO
- ISSN: 0018-9456 (print); 1557-9662 (web)
- LCCN: 57049803
- OCLC no.: 755663642

Links
- Journal homepage; Online access; Online archive

IEEE Transactions on Instrumentation and Measurement is a bimonthly peer-reviewed scientific journal published by the IEEE Instrumentation and Measurement Society. It covers the theory, design and use of electronic instrumentation and measurement techniques. Its editor-in-chief is Roberto Ferrero of the (University of Liverpool).

The journal was established in 1963 as the IRE Transactions on Instrumentation by Institute of Radio Engineers. According to the Journal Citation Reports, the journal has a 2025 impact factor of 7.
