= IEEE Communications Magazine =

- Language: English
- Edited by: Tarek El-Bawab

Publication details
- History: 1979–present
- Publisher: IEEE Communications Society
- Frequency: Monthly
- Impact factor: 11.05 (2019)

Standard abbreviations
- ISO 4: IEEE Commun. Mag.

Indexing
- ISSN: 0163-6804

Links
- Journal homepage; Online access

The IEEE Communications Magazine is a monthly magazine published by the IEEE Communications Society dealing with all areas of communications including light-wave telecommunications, high-speed data communications, personal communications systems (PCS), ISDN, and more. It includes special features, technical articles, book reviews, conferences, short courses, standards, governmental regulations and legislation, new products, and Society news. The magazine is published as IEEE Communications Magazine since 1979, replacing the IEEE Communications Society Magazine (1977–1978) and the Communications Society (1973–1976). According to the Journal Citation Reports, the magazine has a 2013 impact factor of 4.460. It is abstracted and indexed in most of the major bibliographic databases. The current editor-in-chief is Tarek S. El-Bawab.

== Editors ==
- Tarek S. El-Bawab (Jackson State University), 2018–present
- Osman Gebizlioglu (Huawei Technologies), 2015–2017
- Sean Moore (Centripetal Networks), 2013–2014
- Steve Gorshe (PMC-Sierra, Inc.), 2010–2012
- Nim K. Cheung (Telcordia Tech., Inc.), –2009
