= IEEE Photonics Technology Letters =

Semi-monthly peer-reviewed scientific journal

- Discipline: Engineering, Photonics
- Language: English
- Edited by: Boon S. Ooi

Publication details
- History: 1989–present
- Publisher: IEEE Photonics Society
- Frequency: Semi-monthly
- Open access: Hybrid
- Impact factor: 2.486 (2020)

Standard abbreviations
- ISO 4: IEEE Photonics Technol. Lett.

Indexing
- CODEN: IPTLEL
- ISSN: 1941-0174 (print); 1041-1135 (web)
- LCCN: 97659100
- OCLC no.: 67167020

Links
- Journal homepage; Online archive

IEEE Photonics Technology Letters is a semi-monthly peer-reviewed scientific journal which focuses on the theory, design, fabrication, and performance of lasers and optical devices as well as optical fibre technologies. It is published by the IEEE Photonics Society and was established in 1989. The editor-in-chief is Boon S. Ooi (King Abdullah University of Science and Technology).

== Abstracting and indexing ==
The journal is abstracted and indexed in:

- Current Contents/Electronics & Telecommunications Collection
- Current Contents/Engineering, Computing & Technology
- Current Contents/Physical, Chemical & Earth Sciences
- Ei Compendex
- Inspec
- ProQuest databases
- Science Citation Index Expanded
- Scopus

According to the Journal Citation Reports, the journal has a 2020 impact factor of 2.486.
