= IEEE Journal of Quantum Electronics =

- Discipline: Quantum electronics
- Language: English
- Edited by: Hon Ki Tsang

Publication details
- History: 1965-present
- Publisher: IEEE Photonics Society
- Frequency: Monthly
- Impact factor: 2.1 (2024)

Standard abbreviations
- ISO 4: IEEE J. Quantum Electron.

Indexing
- CODEN: IEJQA7
- ISSN: 0018-9197
- LCCN: 79640399
- OCLC no.: 4760477

Links
- Journal homepage; Online access

The IEEE Journal of Quantum Electronics is a peer-reviewed scientific journal covering optical, electrical, and electronics engineering, and some applied aspects of lasers, physical optics, and quantum electronics. It is published by the IEEE Photonics Society and was established in 1965. The editor-in-chief is Hon Ki Tsang (The Chinese University of Hong Kong). According to the Journal Citation Reports, the journal has a 2024 impact factor of 2.1.

== Abstracting and indexing ==
The journal is abstracted and indexed in:

- Science Citation Index
- Current Contents/Physical, Chemical & Earth Sciences
- Current Contents/Engineering, Computing & Technology

== See also ==
- IEEE Journal of Selected Topics in Quantum Electronics
