= IEEE Photonics Journal =

- Discipline: Photonics
- Language: English
- Edited by: Gabriella Cincotti

Publication details
- History: 2009-present
- Publisher: IEEE
- Frequency: Bimonthly
- Open access: Yes
- License: CC-BY 4.0
- Impact factor: 2.250 (2021)

Standard abbreviations
- ISO 4: IEEE Photonics J.

Indexing
- ISSN: 1943-0647 (print); 1943-0655 (web)
- LCCN: 2008213578
- OCLC no.: 232664463

Links
- Journal homepage; Online archive

IEEE Photonics Journal is a bimonthly peer-reviewed open access scientific journal published by the Institute of Electrical and Electronics Engineers (IEEE). It was established in 2009. The editor-in-chief is Gabriella Cincotti of Roma Tre University.

== Abstracting and indexing ==
The journal is abstracted and indexed in:

- PubMed
- Science Citation Index Expanded
- Scopus

According to the Journal Citation Reports, the journal has a 2021 impact factor of 2.250, ranking it 164th out of 276 journals in the category "Engineering, Electrical & Electronic" and 60th out of 101 journals in the category "Optics".
