= Peter Stoica =

Swedish academic (born 1949)

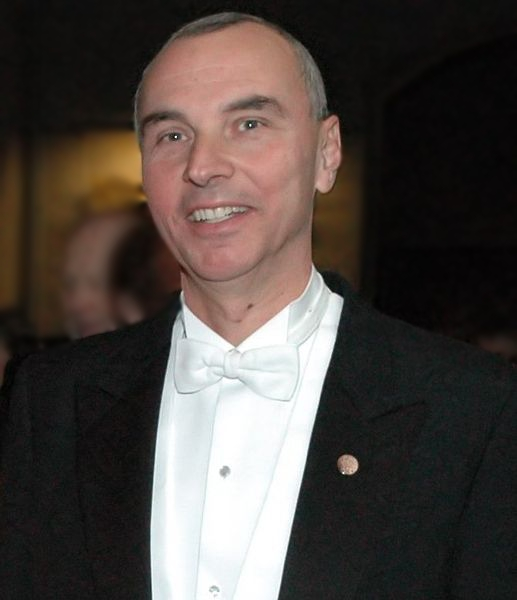
Peter Stoica in 2013

Peter (Petre) Stoica (born 23 July 1949) is a researcher and educator in the field of signal processing and its applications to radar/sonar, communications and bio-medicine. He is a professor of Signals and Systems Modeling at Uppsala University in Sweden, and a Member of the Royal Swedish Academy of Engineering Sciences, the United States National Academy of Engineering (International Member), the Romanian Academy (Honorary Member), the European Academy of Sciences, and the Royal Society of Sciences in Uppsala. He is also a Fellow of IEEE, EURASIP, IETI, NAAI, AIIA, AAIA and the Royal Statistical Society.

== Biography ==
Born in Râmnicu Vâlcea, Peter completed his secondary studies in his native city, after which he went to Bucharest, where he attended from 1967 to 1972 the Faculty of Automatic Control and Computer Science of Politehnica University of Bucharest. In 1979, he obtained the title of Doctor of Engineering in the automatic control specialty, with the thesis "Identification of Systems", and then became a professor at Politehnica University.

He is known for his theoretical contributions to system identification and modeling, spectral analysis, array signal processing, space-time coding, and waveform design for active sensing. His practical contributions include the areas of wireless communications, microwave imaging for breast cancer detection, radar/sonar systems, acoustic source mapping, landmine and explosive detection, and magnetic resonance spectroscopy and imaging. His books on System Identification, Spectral Analysis, and Space-Time Coding for Wireless Communications have been used in both undergraduate and graduate courses and are highly cited (his works rank in the top 1% by citations for the field of engineering). He has been included on the ISI list of the 250 most highly cited researchers in engineering in the world.

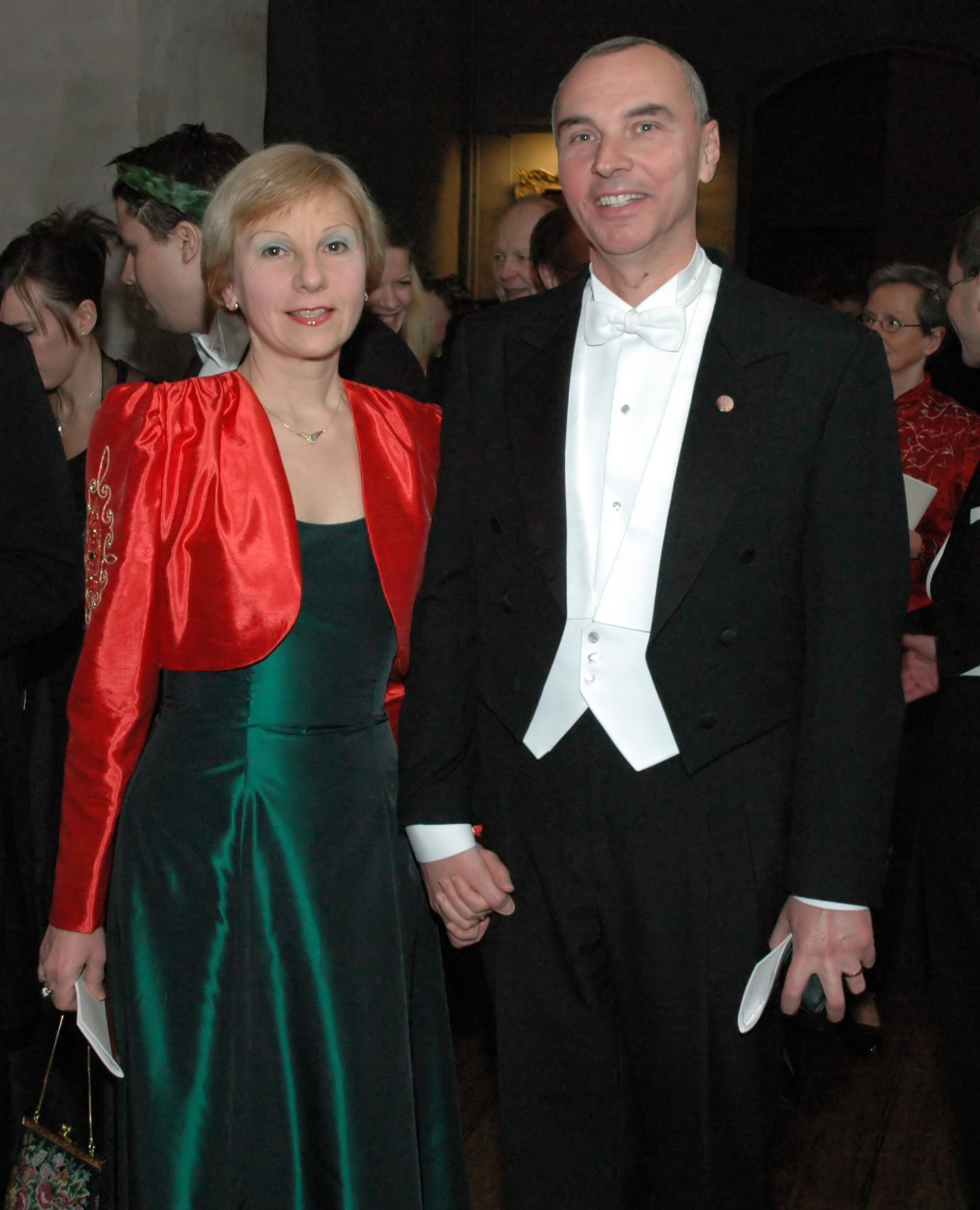
Anca-Juliana and Peter Stoica

Peter and his wife Anca-Juliana (a professor of software and system engineering, docent in the IT Dept of Uppsala University, and IEEE Life Senior Member) live in Uppsala, Sweden. The attached photo shows them during an awards ceremony at the Castle in Uppsala.

== Selected awards ==
- The IEEE ASSP Senior Award, 1989
- Honorary doctorate from the Faculty of Science and Mathematics at Uppsala University, Sweden 1993
- The Shannon-Nyquist Technical Achievement Award of the IEEE Signal Processing Society, 1996
- The IEEE W.R.G. Baker Award, 2000
- The IEEE Third Millennium Medal, 2000
- The EURASIP Individual Technical Achievement Award, 2002
- The Bjorkenska Prize, 2004
- The IEE Achievement Medal, 2005
- The Wiener Society Award of the IEEE Signal Processing Society, 2006
- The Barry Carlton Award of the IEEE Aerospace and Electronic Systems Society, 2008
- The IEEE Signal Processing Society Best Paper Award, 2013
- The EURASIP Athanasios Papoulis Award, 2016
- Rudbeck Gold Medal, 2016
- The IEEE Fourier Award for Signal Processing, 2018
- The C.F. Gauss Education Award of the IEEE Signal Processing Society, 2019
- The Sustained Impact Paper Award of the IEEE Signal Processing Society, 2022

== Selected publications ==
Listed below are some of 800 scientific papers and 30 books and book chapters he wrote.

1. T. Söderström and P. Stoica, System Identification. Prentice-Hall, London, United Kingdom, 1989 (Paperback Edition 1994, Polish Edition 1997, Chinese Edition 2017).
2. P. Stoica and R. Moses, Introduction to Spectral Analysis. Prentice-Hall, Englewood Cliffs, USA, 1997.
3. P. Stoica and A. Nehorai, Music, Maximum likelihood and the Cramér-Rao bound. IEEE Trans. Acoustics, Speech, Signal Processing, vol. ASSP-37, 720–741, 1989.
4. E Larsson and P Stoica, Space-Time Block Coding For Wireless Communications. Cambridge University Press, UK, 2003 (Chinese Edition, 2006).
5. P Stoica and R Moses, Spectral Analysis of Signals. Prentice Hall, NJ, 2005 (Chinese Edition, 2007).
6. H Sampath, P Stoica and A Paulraj, Generalized linear precoder and decoder design for MIMO channels using the weighted MMSE criterion. IEEE Trans Comm, vol 49, 2198–2206, 2001.
7. A Scaglione, P Stoica, S Barbarossa, G Giannakis and H Sampath. Optimal designs for space-time linear precoders and decoders. IEEE Trans Signal Processing, vol 50, 1051–1064, 2002.
8. J Li, P Stoica and Z Wang, On robust Capon beamforming and diagonal loading. IEEE Trans Signal Process, vol 51, 1702–1715, 2003.
9. J Li and P Stoica, MIMO radar with colocated antennas: review of some recent work. IEEE Signal Processing Mag., 106–114, September, 2007.
10. P. Stoica and A. Nehorai, Performance study of conditional and unconditional direction of arrival estimation. IEEE Trans. Acoust., Speech, Signal Process., vol. ASSP-38, 1783–1795, Oct. 1990.

Citation counts for the above publications can be found at Google Scholar.
