= IEEE Fourier Award for Signal Processing =

Technical award

- Awarded for: Contributions in the field of signal processing
- Presented by: Institute of Electrical and Electronics Engineers
- First award: 2015
- Website: IEEE Fourier Award for Signal Processing

The IEEE Fourier Award for Signal Processing is a Technical Field Award that is given by the Institute of Electrical and Electronics Engineers. This award is presented for contributions in the field of signal processing.

The award is named after Joseph Fourier, a French mathematician and physicist who is noted for the representation of periodic signals as linear superpositions of sine-wave basis functions known as the Fourier series, and applications of the Fourier Series to the analysis of vibration and heat transfer. The Fourier transform, which is widely used throughout electrical engineering and in particular signal processing, image processing, and communication theory, is also named in his honor.

The IEEE Fourier Award for Signal Processing may be presented to an individual or team of up to three people.

Recipients of the IEEE Fourier Award for Signal Processing receive a bronze medal, certificate, and honorarium.

== Recipients ==
- 2015: Georgios B. Giannakis
- 2016: Bede Liu
- 2017: Russell Mersereau
- 2018: Peter Stoica
- 2019: Alan C. Bovik
- 2020: Alfred O. Hero III
- 2021: K. J. Ray Liu
- 2022: Ali H. Sayed
- 2023: Rabab Ward
- 2024: Stéphane Mallat
- 2025: Björn Ottersten
- 2026: Nasir Ahmed
- 2027: Nicholas Dimitrios Sidiropoulos

== See also ==
- List of engineering awards
