= IEEE Donald G. Fink Prize Paper Award =

Technical award

- Awarded for: The most outstanding survey, review, or tutorial paper published in one of the IEEE publications between 1 January and 31 December of the preceding year
- Presented by: Institute of Electrical and Electronics Engineers
- First award: 1979
- Final award: 2016
- Website: IEEE Donald G. Fink Prize Paper Award

The IEEE Donald G. Fink Prize Paper Award was established in 1979 by the board of directors of the Institute of Electrical and Electronics Engineers (IEEE) in honor of Donald G. Fink. He was a past president of the Institute of Radio Engineers (IRE), and the first general manager and executive director of the IEEE. Recipients of this award received a certificate and an honorarium. The award was presented annually since 1981 and discontinued in 2016.

== Purpose ==
This award was given for "the most outstanding survey, review, or tutorial paper published in the IEEE Transactions, Journals, Magazines, or in the Proceedings of the IEEE between 1 January and 31 December of the preceding year". The award recipient was selected from the nominees by IEEE's Prize Papers/Scholarship Awards Committee and Awards Board.

== Recipients ==
The following people received the IEEE Donald G. Fink Prize Paper Award:

- 2016: Timothy York, Samuel B. Powell, Shenkui Gao, Lindsey Kahan, Tauseef Charanya, Debajit Saha, Nicholas W. Roberts, Thomas W. Cronin, Justin Marshall, Samuel Achilefu, Spencer P. Lake, Baranidharan Raman and Viktor Gruev
- 2015: Theodore S. Rappaport, Shu Sun, Rimma Mayzus, Hang Zhao, Yaniv Azar, Kevin Wang, George N. Wong, Jocelyn K. Schulz, Mathew Samimi and Felix Gutierrez, Jr.
- 2014: Dipankar Raychaudhuri and Narayan B. Mandayam
- 2013: Stefano Galli, Anna Scaglione and Zhifang Wang
- 2012: Kannan Krishnan
- 2011: Andreas F. Molisch, Larry J. Greenstein and Mansoor Shafi
- 2010: John W. Arthur
- 2009: Daniel J. Costello and G. David Forney, Jr.
- 2008: Yann Frauel, Thomas J. Naughton, Osamu Matoba, Enrique Tajahuerce and Bahram Javidi
- 2007: Michael Shur and Arturas Zukauskas
- 2006: Suhas N. Diggavi, Naofal Al-Dhahir, A. Stamoulis and A. R. Calderbank
- 2005: Oliver Brand, Christoph Hagleitner, Andreas Hierlemann and Henry Baltes
- 2004: Alan S. Willsky
- 2003: Sunil R. Das, C. V. Ramamoorthy, Mansour H. Assaf, Emil M. Petriu and Wen-Ben Jone
- 2002: Ted Painter and Andreas S. Spanias
- 2001: Xin Yao
- 2000: Ezio Biglieri, John Proakis and Shlomo Shamai
- 1999: Richard P. Wildes
- 1998: Francis T. S. Yu and Don A. Gregory
- 1997: Asad A. Abidi
- 1996: Ali H. Sayed and Thomas Kailath
- 1995: Nikil Jayant, James D. Johnston and Robert J. Safranek
- 1994: Andrew P. Sage
- 1993: Pravas R. Mahapatra and Dusan S. Zrni
- 1992: Anthony Ephremides and Sergio Verdú
- 1991: Tadao Murata
- 1990: G. David Forney, Jr.
- 1989: Karl Johan Åström
- 1988: Raymond L. Murray
- 1987: Shahid U. H. Qureshi
- 1986: Thomas H. Johnson
- 1985: Arnold Reisman
- 1984: Enders A. Robinson; Robert A. Scholtz (each for their own paper)
- 1983: Anil K. Jain
- 1982: Arun N. Netravali and John O. Limb
- 1981: Whitfield Diffie and Martin E. Hellman
