= Raychaudhuri =

Raychaudhuri is a surname. Notable people with the name include:

- Amal Kumar Raychaudhuri (1923–2005), Indian physicist in general relativity and cosmology
- Amitava Raychaudhuri, Indian theoretical particle physicist
- Arup Kumar Raychaudhuri (born 1952), Indian condensed matter physicist, Distinguished Emeritus Professor
- Dipankar Raychaudhuri (born 1955), Director of the Wireless Information Network Laboratory (WINLAB)
- Hem Chandra Raychaudhuri (1892–1957), Indian historian, known for his studies on ancient India
- Pratap Raychaudhuri (born 1971), Indian physicist at Tata Institute of Fundamental Research, Bombay
- Soumya Raychaudhuri, Professor of Medicine and Biomedical informatics at Harvard Medical School
- Tapan Raychaudhuri (1926–2014), British-Indian historian specializing in British Indian history

== See also ==
- Raychaudhuri equation, a fundamental result describing the motion of nearby bits of matter
