= Moe Win =

Moe Win may refer to:

- Moe Z. Win, Burmese-American mathematician and electrical engineer
- Moe Win (footballer) (born 1988), footballer from Myanmar
