= Sondhi =

Sondhi may refer to: Sondhi is a surname and clan of Jat Sikhs from Punjab, India. Sondhi only belongs to the Jat tribe.

== Surname ==
- Guru Dutt Sondhi (1890–1966), founder of the Asian Games Federation (AGF)
- Man Mohan Sondhi (1933–2018), speech processing researcher at Bell Labs
- Manohar Lal Sondhi (1933–2003), member of Lok Sabha
- Maya Sondhi (born c. 1983), British-Asian television actress
- Ranjit Sondhi, BBC Governor
- Shivaji Sondhi, Indian-born theoretical physicist

== Name ==
- Sondhi Limthongkul (born 1947), Thai media mogul and activist
- Sondhi Boonyaratkalin (born 1946), former Commander-in-Chief of the Royal Thai Army

== See also ==
- Sonthi (disambiguation)
