= Franz Hlawatsch =

Franz Hlawatsch (born 1959) is an Austrian Professor of electrical and electronic engineering at the Vienna University of Technology, Austria.

== Early life and career ==
Hlawatsch was educated at the Vienna University of Technology from which he obtained various degrees in engineering in 1983, 1988, and 1996 respectively. From 1983 to 1988 he worked as a consultant for Schrack AG, and from 1984 to 1985 for the AKG GesmbH. From 1991 to 1992 he was an Erwin Schrödinger Fellow and because of it, he spent a year in Rhode Island, United States at the Department of Electrical Engineeringg of the University of Rhode Island. From 1999 to 2001 Hlawatsch was a visiting professor at the Telecommunications for Space and Aeronautics, ENSEEIHT and Laboratory of Digital Sciences of Nantes.

Prof. Hlawatsch is an associate editor of the IEEE Transactions on Information Theory, the IEEE Transactions on Signal Processing and the IEEE Transactions on Signal and Information Processing over Networks.

== Awards ==
In 2012, Hlawatsch was named a Fellow of the Institute of Electrical and Electronics Engineers (IEEE) for contributions to time-frequency signal processing and in 2018 became a fellow of EUROSIP.
