= Georgios B. Giannakis =

American computer scientist (born 1958)

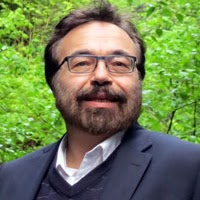
- Born: 27 February 1958 (age 68); Piraeus, Greece
- Education: University of Southern California; National Tech. Univ. of Athens
- Scientific career
- Fields: Statistical signal processing; Wireless communications; Network science; Data science
- Workplaces: University of Minnesota; University of Virginia
- Website: spincom.umn.edu

Georgios B. Giannakis (born 27 February 1958) is a Greek-American Computer Scientist, engineer and inventor. He has been an Endowed Chair Professor of Wireless Telecommunications, he was Director of the Digital Technology Center, and at present he is a McKnight Presidential Chair with the Department of Electrical and Computer Engineering at the University of Minnesota.

Giannakis is internationally known for his work in the areas of statistical signal processing, distributed estimation using sensor networks, wireless communications and cross-layer network designs, on topics such as auto-regressive moving average system identification using higher-order statistics, principal component filter banks, linear precoding, multicarrier modulation, ultra-wideband communications, cognitive radios, and smart grids. Seminal work includes the development of linear precoding wireless communication systems, which provided a unified approach for designing space–time block codes that achieve data high rates and reliability, and proposal of zero-padding as an alternative to the cyclic prefix for multi-carrier communication systems, which had impact in the multi-band ultra wide band standard. Current research focuses on big data, graph learning, and network science with applications to communication, and power networks with renewables.

Giannakis has left a substantial academic legacy as an advisor of more than 60 PhD and 35 MSc dissertations, as well as a mentor of more than 30 postdoctoral researchers at the University of Virginia and the University of Minnesota.

== Early life ==
Born in Piraeus and raised in Corinth, Greece, Giannakis received his MEng in Electrical and Mechanical Engineering from the National Technical University of Athens in 1981, his M.Sc. in Electrical Engineering from the University of Southern California in 1983, his M.Sc. in mathematics from the University of Southern California in 1986, and his PhD in Electrical Engineering from the University of Southern California also in 1986. After completing his Ph.D., he started his academic career at the University of Virginia in 1987 and moved to the University of Minnesota in 1999. As a professor, he built a distinguished research group making contributions in many areas including statistical signal processing, wireless communications, sensor and mobile ad hoc networks, and artificial intelligence (AI).

== Awards and honors ==
In 2023, Giannakis became an International Fellow of UK's Royal Academy of Engineering, and received the IEEE Women in Communications Engineering (WICE) Outstanding Mentorship Award. In 2022, he received the Distinguished Alumni Award from the Signal and Image Processing Institute at the University of Southern California; and the Faculty Award for Excellence in Postdoctoral Advising at the University of Minnesota. In 2021, Giannakis became a corresponding member of the Academy of Athens, Greece. In 2020, he was inducted as International Member of Academia Europaea. In the same year, he won the European Association for Signal Processing (EURASIP) "Athanasios Papoulis," Society Award, and was elected Fellow of the European Academy of Sciences. In 2019, he was the winner of the Institute for Electrical and Electronics Engineers (IEEE) Signal Processing "Norbert Wiener" Society Award; he was also named Fellow of the US National Academy of Inventors (NAI); and won the IEEE Communications Society Education Award. In 2018, he received honorary doctorate degrees from the University of Patras, and the University of Peloponnese, Greece. In 2016, Giannakis was appointed to the prestigious McKnight Presidential Endowed Chair at the University of Minnesota.; and from 2001 to 2008 he held the Endowed Chair in Wireless Telecommunications at the U. of Minnesota. In 2015, Giannakis became the inaugural recipient of the IEEE Technical Field Fourier Award for Signal Processing. From 2012 to 2017, he served as member of the Board of Regents, University of Patras, Greece. In 2008, Giannakis became Fellow of EURASIP, and in 2005 he received EURASIP's Technical Achievement Award. Earlier in 1997, he became Fellow of the IEEE, and in 2000 he received the Technical Achievement Award from the IEEE Signal Processing Society.

Giannakis is listed in the top 20 of ISI’s Highly Cited Researchers in ECE and Computer Science. His publications have received more than 100,475 citations with h-index=175. In Thomson Reuters "World’s Most Influential Scientific Minds" he ranks at the top 300 from all fields of Engineering, Informatics, and Computer Science.

Giannakis is also a co-author of eleven best journal paper awards including the IEEE Communications Society's Gugliermo Marconi Prize Paper Award for work on linear precoding, the 2003 IEEE Signal Processing Society's SP Magazine Best Paper Award for a paper on wireless multicarrier communication, an IEEE Signal Processing Society's Best Paper Award in 2001 for work on parallel factor analysis in sensor array processing, an IEEE Signal Processing Society's Best Paper Award, 2000 for work on designing filterbank precoders and equalizers.

== Invention and commercialization ==
Giannakis has 37 US and foreign patents issued in the fields of wireless communications (several related to the 4G LTE standard), cognitive radio sensing, signal processing, power system monitoring, and photovoltaic inverters in residential power distribution. Through those, he became a fellow of the US National Academy of Inventors. Giannakis’ standard essential patents for LTE and 5G were at the center of a litigation brought by the U. of Minnesota, which was settled with a significant amount in 2025 (highest received by the College of Science and Engineering at the University of Minnesota).

== Selected books and book chapters ==
- G. B. Giannakis, Y. Hua, P. Stoica, L. Tong, Editors, Signal Processing Advances in Wireless and Mobile Communications, Vol. 1: Trends in Channel Est. and Equalization, Prentice Hall, 2000.
- G. B. Giannakis, Y. Hua, P. Stoica, L. Tong, Editors, Signal Processing Advances in Wireless and Mobile Communications, Vol. 2: Trends in Single- and Multi-User Systems, Prentice Hall, Inc., 2000.
- G. B. Giannakis, Z. Liu, X. Ma, and S. Zhou, Space-Time Coding for Broadband Wireless Communications, John Wiley & Sons, Inc., 2007.
- V. Kekatos, G. Wang, H. Zhu, and G. B. Giannakis, "PSSE redux: Convex relaxation, decentralized, robust, and dynamic approaches", Chapter in Advances in Electric Power and Energy; M. El-Hawary Editor, 2018.
- G. Mateos and G. B. Giannakis, "Robust PCA by controlling sparsity in model residuals", Chapter in T. Bouwmans, E. Zahzah, and N. Aybat, Editors, CRC Press, 2017.
- G. B. Giannakis, G. Mateos, I. D. Schizas, H. Zhu, and Q. Ling, "Decentralized learning for wireless communications and networking", Chapter in Splitting Methods... by R. Glowinski, S. Osher, and W. Yin, Editors, NY, Springer, 2016.
- X. Ma and G. B. Giannakis, "Communicating over Wireless Doubly-Selective Channels", Chapter in Space-Time Wireless..., H. Boelcskei, D. Gesbert, C.B. Papadias and A.-J. van der Veen Eds., Cambridge U. Press, 2006.
- Z. Tian, T. Davidson, X. Luo, X. Wu and G. B. Giannakis, "Ultra-Wideband Pulse-Shaper Design", Chapter in UWB Wireless Communications, H. Arslan and Y. Chen, Wiley 2005.
- G. B. Giannakis, "Statistical Signal Processing", Chapter in DSP, V. K. Madisetti, D. Williams, Editors-in-Chief, CRC Press, 1998.
- G. B. Giannakis, "Trends in Spectral Analysis: Higher-Order and Cyclic Statistics", Chapter in Digital Signal Proc. Tech., P. Papamichalis and R. Kerwin, Eds., pp. 74–97, vol. CR57, 1995.

== Selected publications ==
- S. Gezici, Z. Tian, G. B. Giannakis, H. Kobayashi, A. V. Molisch, H. V. Poor and Z. Sahinoglu, "Localization via Ultra-Wideband Radios", IEEE Signal Processing Magazine, vol. 22, no. 4, pp. 70–84, July 2005.
- L. Yang, and G. B. Giannakis, "Ultra-Wideband Communications: An Idea whose Time has Come", IEEE Signal Processing Magazine, vol. 21, no. 6, pp. 26–54, November 2004.
- Q. Liu, S. Zhou, and G. B. Giannakis, "Cross-Layer Combining of Adaptive Modulation and Coding with Truncated ARQ over Wireless Links", IEEE Trans. on Wireless Communications, vol. 3, no. 5, pp. 1746–1755, September 2004.
- Z. Wang, and G. B. Giannakis, "A Simple and General Parameterization Quantifying Performance in Fading Channels", IEEE Transactions on Communications, vol. 51, no. 8, pp. 1389–1398, August 2003.
- P. Xia, and G. B. Giannakis, "Design and Analysis of Transmit-Beamforming based on Limited-Rate Feedback", IEEE Transactions on Signal Processing, vol. 54, no. 5, pp. 1853–1863, May 2006.
- G. B. Giannakis, P. Anghel and Z. Wang, "Generalized Multi-Carrier CDMA: Unification and Equalization", EURASIP Journal of Applied Signal Processing, pp. 743–756, February 2005.
- Y. Xin, Z. Wang, and G. B. Giannakis, "Space-Time Diversity Systems based on Linear Constellation Precoding", IEEE Transactions on Wireless Communications, vol. 2, no. 2, pp. 294–309, March 2003.
- N. D. Sidiropoulos, R. Bro, and G. B. Giannakis, "Parallel Factor Analysis in Sensor Array Processing", IEEE Transactions on Signal Processing, vol. 48, pp. 2377–2388, August 2000.
- Z. Wang and G. B. Giannakis, "Wireless Multicarrier Communications: Where Fourier Meets Shannon", IEEE Signal Processing Magazine, vol. 17, pp. 29–48, May 2000.
- A. Scaglione, G. B. Giannakis, and S. Barbarossa, "Redundant Filterbank Precoders and Equalizers Part I: Unification and Optimal Designs", IEEE Transactions on Signal Processing, vol. 47, pp. 1988– 2006, July 1999.
- M. K. Tsatsanis and G. B. Giannakis, "Principal component filter banks for optimal multiresolution analysis", IEEE Transactions on Signal Processing, vol. 43, pp. 1766–1777, August 1995.
- G. B. Giannakis and J. M. Mendel, "Identification of non-minimum phase systems using higher-order statistics", IEEE Transactions on Acoustics Speech and Signal Processing, vol. 37, pp. 360–377, March 1989.

== Selected patents ==
- G. B. Giannakis, and X. Ma, "Estimating Frequency-offsets and Multi-antenna Channels in MIMO-OFDM Systems", US Patent no. US 10,700,800 B2; issued June 30, 2020; impacted LTE (3GPP Tech. Spec.36.211, Sec.6.10).
- S. Dhople, G. B. Giannakis, and E. Dall’Anese, "Decentralized Optimal Dispatch of Photovoltaic Inverters in Power Distribution Systems", US Patent no. 10,139,800 B2, issued Nov. 27, 2018.
- G. B. Giannakis, and H. Zhu, "State Estimation of Electrical Power Networks using Semidefinite Relaxation", US Patent no. 9,863,985, issued January 9, 2018.
- G. B. Giannakis, E. Dall'Anese, J. A. Bazerque, H. Zhu, and G. Mateos, "Robust Parametric Power Spectrum Density Map Construction", US Patent no. 9,363,679, issued June 7, 2016; RF maps for wireless cognitive radios.
- G. B. Giannakis, G. Mateos, and J. A. Bazerque, "Non-parametric Power Spectral Density Map Construction", US Patent no. 9,191,831, issued November 17, 2015.
- G. B. Giannakis, Y. Xin, and Z. Wang, "Wireless communication system having linear encoder", US Patent no. RE45,230, issued Nov. 4, 2014; complex-field codes that combat fading effects to ensure fast-reliable wireless links.
- G. B. Giannakis, P. Xia and S. Zhou, "Bandwidth- and Power-Efficient Multi-Carrier Multiple Access for Uplink Broadband Wireless Communications", US Patent no. 7,672,384, issued March 2, 2010.
