= Kannan M. Krishnan =

- Occupations: Academic, author, entrepreneur, and artist
- Awards: Eli Franklin Burton Medal, Microscopy Society of America (1992); John Simon Guggenheim Foundation Fellowship (2004); Elected Member, Washington State Academy of Science (2009); Donald G. Fink Prize, IEEE (2012); Alexander von Humboldt Career Research Award, Alexander von Humboldt Foundation (2016)

Academic background
- Education: BTech in mechanical engineering MS in materials science & engineering PhD in material science & engineering
- Alma mater: Indian Institute of Technology, Kanpur; State University of New York, Stony Brook; University of California, Berkeley

Academic work
- Discipline: Materials scientist & engineer, physicist, bioengineer, and educator
- Institutions: University of Washington (UW); University of California, Berkeley (UCB)

Kannan M. Krishnan is an Indian-American academic, author and entrepreneur. He is a professor of materials science and engineering, an adjunct professor of physics, and an Associate Faculty of the South Asia Centre, at the University of Washington, Seattle (UW).

Krishnan has contributed to the field of biomedical nanomagnetics, especially the applications of tailored magnetic biomaterials in medicine, emphasizing imaging, and therapy, and including their commercialization and clinical translations. He was also the first to develop a patented material architecture for semiconductor-magnetic device integration. He also identified a new class of materials ––dilute magnetic dielectrics –– that are both ferromagnetic and insulating, and showed that the ferromagnetism in such materials is defect-mediated. He is also a well-recognized teacher, writing two textbooks, Fundamentals and Applications of Magnetic Materials (2016), and Principles of Materials Characterization and Metrology (2021), both published by Oxford University Press.

Krishnan is known in multiple disciplines for his scholarship, research, teaching, and mentoring. His awards include the TMS Weertman Educator Award (2024), Alexander von Humboldt Forschungspreis (2016), the TMS Distinguished Engineer/Scientist (2015), IEEE Fink Prize (2012), IEEE Magnetics Society Distinguished Lecturer (2009), Fulbright Specialist (2010), Guggenheim (2004) and Rockefeller (2008) Fellowships, the Burton Medal (MSA,1992), and the College of Engineering Outstanding Educator (UW, 2004).

Krishnan is an elected member of the Washington State Academy of Sciences, and Fellow of the American Association for the Advancement of Science, the American Physical Society, the Institute of Physics (London), and the Institute of Electrical and Electronics Engineers. He has served on the editorial boards of the Journal of Magnetism & Magnetic Materials, Journal of Materials Science, Acta Materialia, Journal of Physics D: Applied Physics, IEEE Magnetics Letters and Medical Physics. In 2010, along with two graduate students, he started a company, LodeSpin Labs, to develop tailored magnetic carriers for a range of biomedical applications.

== Education ==
Krishnan studied at Indian Institute of Technology, Kanpur, where he earned his Bachelor of Technology degree in Mechanical Engineering in 1978. He then pursued his Master of Science in Materials Science & Engineering from the State University of New York, Stony Brook in 1980, and completed his PhD in Materials Science & Engineering from the University of California, Berkeley in 1984, where he also minored in Physics and Mathematics.

== Career ==
After completing his PhD in 1984, Krishnan held various scientific and teaching positions at Lawrence Berkeley National Laboratory and UC Berkeley, before joining the University of Washington, in 2001, as the Campbell Chair Professor of Materials Sciences & Engineering and adjunct professor of physics. He has also held visiting appointments at multiple institutions including the Hitachi Central Research Laboratory (Japan), Tohoku University, University Klinikum-Eppendorf, Hamburg, University of São Paulo, University of Western Australia, University of Alexandria (Egypt), and the Indian Institute of Science.

In addition to his academic work, from 2010 to 2020, Krishnan founded LodeSpin Labs, a startup company to develop tailored magnetic nanoparticles for diverse biomedical applications. He holds five patents for his research.

== Research ==
Krishnan's academic scholarship and research spans three areas. First being Condensed Matter Physics and Materials Science & Engineering, with a focus on nanoscale magnetic and transport phenomena in reduced dimensions, including their inter-coupling, to develop new paradigms for materials & devices in the context of novel information (storage, processing, and logic) and energy technologies. Second, Bioengineering at the intersection of Magnetism, Materials, and Medicine with an emphasis on diagnostics, imaging, and therapy, alongside translational research and commercialization activities. And third, Materials Characterization and Metrology, addressing structure-property correlations using electrons, photons, and scanning probes.

=== Books ===
Krishnan's first book, Fundamentals and Applications of Magnetic Materials (2016), is an interdisciplinary textbook on magnetism, magnetic materials, and related applications. Written in a pedagogical style, its chapters progress from the physics of magnetism, to magnetic phenomena in materials, to size and dimensionality effects, to applications. The second half of the book offers interdisciplinary discussions of information technology, magnetoelectronics, and the future of biomedicine via recent developments in magnetism. The book also includes relevant details of the chemical synthesis of small particles and the physical deposition of ultra-thin films. In addition, the book presents details of characterization methods and summaries of representative families of materials, including tables of properties. CGS equivalents (to SI) are included throughout the book. The book has received reviews, including: "The breadth and depth of the work is impressive, there are numerous clear illustrations, and extensive references to research literature up to 2016... For a teacher of advanced classes who needs real-world applications, or for an early-stage researcher looking for a wider context, this is a rich source. As an up-to-date guide to the technology of magnetic materials it excels."; and "There are other books on similar topics, but this one is the most comprehensive in its wide and thorough coverage of applications ranging from magnetic storage to spintronics to bio-related applications... Despite the broad coverage of this book, most topics are discussed in depth... An excellent book for advanced undergraduate and graduate students, and researchers in the field."

Krishnan's second book, Principles of Materials Characterization and Metrology (2021), is based on the premise that characterization enables a microscopic understanding of the fundamental properties of materials (Science) to predict their macroscopic behavior (Engineering). It combines a discussion of the physical principles and practical application of various characterization techniques, using electrons, photons, neutrons and scanning probes. A review in Contemporary Physics stated "This is an excellent textbook for a course on the structural characterization of materials. It could also find a place on the bookshelf of an experienced materials scientist wanting to be brought up to date on new techniques and their applications."

=== Biomedical nanomagnetics ===
Krishnan pioneered the colloidal synthesis of Co nanoparticles (NPs) with size and shape control to tailor their magnetic properties, and extended this approach to synthesize phase-pure magnetite NPs, with near-ideal magnetization, by controlled oxidation during growth. He solved the problem of optimizing the a.c. magnetic response, in vivo, of iron-oxide NPs for any applied frequency: using Monte Carlo simulations he determined the optimal core size to be at the threshold of the superparamagnetic transition, synthesized the required NPs, and controlled their biocompatibility and inter-particle interactions with hydrophilic coatings of well-defined molecular size. With this approach, he pioneered the development of nanomagnetic tracers to achieve sub-mm resolution and nanogram sensitivity, in vivo, in Magnetic Particle Imaging (MPI) –– a new tracer-based, whole-body imaging technology with high contrast (no tissue background) and nanogram sensitivity.

=== Magnetic thin films and nanostructures ===
Krishnan's work in this area has led to the development of tunable mesoscale magnetic structures by nanoimprint lithography and ion-beam patterning technologies. In addition to fabricating elements with unique three-dimensional shapes, these patterned elements have provided fundamental insight into magnetic behavior at the nanoscale and the opportunity to design new architectures for magnetic quantum cellular automata –– a new approach to creating magnetic logic gates and computing without electrical current, artificial spin ice, and the emerging field of spin-orbitronics. His work has also led to significant new materials and structures, including the first development of a patented material architecture for semiconductor-magnetic device integration.

Krishnan synthesized and studied ferromagnetism in transition-metal-doped wide band-gap semiconducting oxides. He identified a class of new materials –– dilute magnetic dielectrics –– that are both ferromagnetic and insulating and showed that the ferromagnetism in such materials is defect-mediated. He also contributed to the understanding of transport mechanisms in colossal magnetoresistive oxides.

=== Materials characterization and metrology ===
Krishnan developed characterization methodologies for various materials, particularly using electron and photon probes. Early in his career, for his doctoral thesis at UC, Berkeley, he developed a technique, subsequently known as ALCHEMI, combining the theory of inelastic scattering of fast electrons with experimental measurements and demonstrated the applicability of this technique for determining the specific-site occupations of elements in a wide range of crystalline materials. He has also developed and applied numerous imaging, spectroscopy and scattering methods, including the use of advanced characterization tools for this purpose using electrons (holography and electron energy-loss spectroscopy), photons (synchrotron radiation), and scanning probes. His contributions in this field include the first direct evidence for block-by-block growth of high-temperature superconductor ultra-thin films, and studies of the scaling of interface roughness in magnetic superlattices at the atomic scale using element-specific energy filtered imaging.

== Awards and honors ==
- 1992 – Eli Franklin Burton Medal, Microscopy Society of America
- 2004 – UW College of Engineering Outstanding Educator Award, University of Washington
- 2004 – Guggenheim Fellowship, John Simon Guggenheim Memorial Foundation
- 2006 – Professor-at-large Award, University of Western Australia
- 2008 – Rockefeller Bellagio Residency Fellowship, Rockefeller Foundation
- 2009 – Distinguished Lecturer Award, IEEE Magnetics Society
- 2010 – Fulbright Specialist Award, University of Alexandria, Egypt
- 2012 – Donald G. Fink Prize, IEEE
- 2015 – FMD Distinguished Scientist/Engineer Award, The Minerals, Metals & Materials Society (TMS)
- 2015 – SUPA Visiting Professorship, University of Glasgow
- 2015 – Elected Member, Washington State Academy of Science
- 2016 – Alexander von Humboldt Career Research Award, Alexander von Humboldt Foundation
- 2016 – Brahm Prakash Visiting Professor, Indian Institute of Science, Bangalore, India
- 2024 – Julia and Hans Weertman Educator Award, The Minerals, Metals & Materials Soc. (TMS)

== Bibliography ==
=== Books ===
- Fundamentals and Applications of Magnetic Materials (2016), Oxford University Press, ISBN 978-0198862048
- Principles of Materials Characterization and Metrology (2021), Oxford University Press, ISBN 978-0198830269

=== Selected publications ===
- Puntes, V. F., Krishnan, K. M., & Alivisatos, A. P. (2001). Colloidal nanocrystal shape and size control: the case of cobalt. Science, 291(5511), 2115–2117.
- Puntes, V. F., Krishnan, K. M., & Alivisatos, P. (2001). Synthesis, self-assembly, and magnetic behavior of a two-dimensional superlattice of single-crystal ε-Co nanoparticles. Applied Physics Letters, 78(15), 2187–2189.
- Griffin, K. A., Pakhomov, A. B., Wang, C. M., Heald, S. M., & Krishnan, K. M. (2005). Intrinsic ferromagnetism in insulating cobalt doped anatase TiO 2. Physical Review Letters, 94(15), 157204.
- Krishnan, K. M., Pakhomov, A. B., Bao, Y., Blomqvist, P., Chun, Y., Gonzales, M., ... & Roberts, B. K. (2006). Nanomagnetism and spin electronics: materials, microstructure and novel properties. Journal of Materials Science, 41, 793–815.
- Gonzales-Weimuller, M., Zeisberger, M., & Krishnan, K. M. (2009). Size-dependant heating rates of iron oxide nanoparticles for magnetic fluid hyperthermia. Journal of Magnetism and Magnetic Materials, 321(13), 1947–1950.
- Krishnan, K. M. (2010). Biomedical nanomagnetics: a spin through possibilities in imaging, diagnostics, and therapy. IEEE Transactions on Magnetics, 46(7), 2523–2558.
- Goodwill, P. W., Saritas, E. U., Croft, L. R., Kim, T. N., Krishnan, K. M., Schaffer, D. V., & Conolly, S. M. (2012). X‐space MPI: magnetic nanoparticles for safe medical imaging. Advanced Materials, 24(28), 3870–3877.
- Arami, H., Khandhar, A., Liggitt, D., & Krishnan, K. M. (2015). In vivo delivery, pharmacokinetics, biodistribution and toxicity of iron oxide nanoparticles. Chemical Society Reviews, 44(23), 8576–8607.
- Hufschmid, R., Arami, H., Ferguson, R. M., Gonzales, M., Teeman, E., Brush, L. N., ... & Krishnan, K. M. (2015). Synthesis of phase-pure and monodisperse iron oxide nanoparticles by thermal decomposition. Nanoscale, 7(25), 11142–11154.
- Yu, E. Y., Bishop, M., Zheng, B., Ferguson, R. M., Khandhar, A. P., Kemp, S. J., ... & Conolly, S. M. (2017). Magnetic particle imaging: a novel in vivo imaging platform for cancer detection. Nano Letters, 17(3), 1648–1654.
