= Ali H. Sayed =

Brazilian electrical engineer

Ali Hussein Sayed
- Education: Electrical Engineering, University of São Paulo (BSc & MSc); Electrical Engineering, Stanford University (PhD)
- Known for: Research in electrical engineering
- Scientific career
- Workplaces: UCLA (distinguished professor and former chair of electrical engineering), IEEE (President of the IEEE Signal Processing Society), EPFL (dean of engineering)
- Thesis: Displacement structure in signal processing and mathematics (1992)
- Doctoral advisor: Thomas Kailath

Ali Hussein Sayed (born São Paulo, Brazil, to parents of Lebanese descent) is the dean of engineering at EPFL (École polytechnique fédérale de Lausanne), where he teaches and conducts research on Adaptation (Signal Processes), Learning, Statistical Signal Processing, and Signal Processing for Communications. He is the Director of the EPFL Adaptive Systems Laboratory. He has authored several books on estimation and filtering theories, including the textbook Adaptive Filters, published by Wiley & Sons in 2008. Professor Sayed received the degrees of Engineer and Master of Science in Electrical Engineering from the University of São Paulo, Brazil, in 1987 and 1989, respectively, and the Doctor of Philosophy degree in electrical engineering from Stanford University in 1992.

== Awards and honors ==
- Sayed was elected a member of the National Academy of Engineering in 2018 for contributions to the theory and applications of adaptive signal processing.
- Frederick Emmons Terman Award from the American Society for Engineering Education (2005).
- Distinguished Lecturer of the IEEE Signal Processing Society (2005).
- Kuwait Prize in Basic Sciences from the Kuwait Foundation for the Advancement of Sciences (2003).
- Fellow of the Institute of Electrical and Electronics Engineers (2001) for contributions to adaptive filtering and estimation algorithms.

His papers have received several awards:

- 2005 Co-author for "Young Author Best Paper Award" of Waleed M. Younis from the IEEE Signal Processing Society (together with Naofal Al-Dhahir).
- 2002 "Best Paper Award" from the IEEE Signal Processing Society.
- 1996 IEEE Donald G. Fink Prize Paper Award (together with Thomas Kailath).

He served as Editor-in-Chief of the IEEE Transactions on Signal Processing (2003–2005) and the EURASIP Journal on Advances in Signal Processing (2006–2007).

== Books ==
- Ali H. Sayed, Adaptive Filters, Wiley, NJ, 2008 (ISBN 978-0-470-25388-5).
- Ali H. Sayed, Fundamentals of Adaptive Filtering, Wiley, NJ, 2003 (ISBN 0-471-46126-1).
- Thomas Kailath, Ali H. Sayed, and Babak Hassibi, Linear Estimation, Prentice-Hall, NJ, 2000 (ISBN 978-0-13-022464-4).
- Thomas Kailath and Ali H. Sayed, editors, Fast Reliable Algorithms for Matrices with Structure, Society for Industrial & Applied Mathematics (SIAM), PA, 1999 (ISBN 0-89871-431-1).
- Babak Hassibi, Ali H. Sayed, and Thomas Kailath, Indefinite Quadratic Estimation and Control: A Unified Approach to H^{2} and H^{∞} Theories, Society for Industrial & Applied Mathematics (SIAM), PA, 1999 (ISBN 978-0-89871-411-1).
