= Jan P. Allebach =

American engineer, educator and researcher

Jan. P. Allebach
- Education: Princeton University, University of Delaware
- Known for: Contributions to imaging science
- Awards: Member, National Academy of Engineering; 2004 Electronic Imaging Scientist of the Year; 2013 Daniel E. Noble Award for Emerging Technologies; 2016 Edwin H. Land Medal; Society for Imaging Science and Technology Honorary Membership; Fellow, National Academy of Inventors; 2020 Johann Gutenberg Prize
- Scientific career
- Fields: Electronic imaging systems, image capture and rendering, color image processing, image quality, document imaging
- Workplaces: Purdue University, School of Electrical and Computer Engineering
- Thesis: Digital - Optical Signal Processing
- Doctoral advisor: Bede Liu

Jan P. Allebach is an American engineer, educator and researcher known for contributions to imaging science including halftoning, digital image processing, color management, visual perception, and image quality. He is Distinguished Professor Emeritus of Electrical and Computer Engineering at Purdue University.

== Career ==
Allebach earned a Bachelor of Science in Electrical Engineering from the University of Delaware in 1972, and a MSE and PhD in Electrical Engineering from Princeton University in 1975 and 1976 respectively. After receiving his PhD, he joined the Department of Electrical Engineering at the University of Delaware. In 1983, Allebach accepted a position with the School of Electrical Engineering at Purdue University. After more than 40 years of service, Allebach retired from the university in 2024.

Allebach is known for his contributions to digital halftoning, which is the process of rendering continuous-tone images with printing or display devices that can only directly represent a relatively small number of different output levels. Digital halftoning uses algorithms to generate a pattern of textures that have the appearance of continuous tones when perceived by the viewer at the appropriate distance, given the limited ability of the human visual system to resolve high spatial frequencies. In 1977 Allebach published a paper that provided a framework for understanding and developing screening-based digital halftoning algorithms. In 1979 he reported on the very first algorithm for computer-aided design of dither matrices. Such search-based methods are now routinely used for the design of halftone screens. After 1980, Allebach turned his attention elsewhere due to the lack of practical applications at that time for his halftoning work. He continued his investigation of the synthesis of digital diffractive elements (holograms). During this time, Allebach developed a novel search-based algorithm for the design of digital diffractive elements that he called Direct Binary Search or DBS. Building on this research, in 1992 Allebach and his student, Mostafa Analoui, reported the invention of the Direct Binary Search (DBS) digital halftoning algorithm. In the context of halftoning, DBS is a search-based algorithm that minimizes the total-squared error between the perceived continuous-tone image and the perceived halftone image. A key aspect of the algorithm is a mechanism for evaluating the effect on the error metric of trial changes to the halftone image. The model for the human visual system that is used to generate the perceived images is based on filtering the input image with a point-spread function that is derived from psychophysical measurements of the spatial contrast sensitivity of the human viewer. Eight years of further work led to the seminal publication on DBS by Allebach and his student, David Lieberman, in 2000. DBS is an iterative search-based algorithm, and thus is not practical for implementation as an embedded application in a printer. It is used as a tool for the design of other halftoning algorithms implemented in many printers.

In 2004, Allebach and his student, Pingshan Li, reported on the invention of the tone-dependent error diffusion (TDED) halftoning algorithm. The TDED halftoning algorithm is developed via an off-line process in which the error diffusion weights and thresholds are trained level-by-level to yield a halftone image at each level for which the 2D Fourier spectrum matches that produced by DBS. When applied to pictorial content, what results is an image that at a microscopic scale has colorant dots in locations that do not match the DBS reference image, but which at a macroscopic scale, has effectively the same visual quality as the DBS reference image. The TDED halftoning algorithm generates high quality halftone images with greater computational efficiency than the DBS halftoning algorithm. HP Inc. is assigned the patent for Tone Dependent Error Diffusion.

Allebach has extended his work with digital halftoning to the printing of color images with the use of a novel spatio-chromatic model for the human visual system, as well as to 3D printing.

In 2014, Allebach was elected into the National Academy of Engineering for the development of algorithms for digital image half-toning for imaging and printing.

== Awards ==
In 2004, Allebach was named Electronic Imaging Scientist of the Year by the Society for Imaging Science and Technology (IS&T) “for his leadership as an educator and researcher in the electronic imaging community, for his contributions to image halftoning, color image processing, and the use of our understanding of the human visual system in image processing.” Allebach was inducted into the National Academy of Engineering in 2014 “for development of algorithms for digital image half-toning for imaging and printing.” He is a Fellow of IEEE, IS&T, SPIE, and the National Academy of Inventors. In 2007, Allebach was awarded Honorary Membership from IS&T. In 2013, Allebach was honored with the IEEE’s Daniel E. Noble Award for Emerging Technologies, and in 2016, with the Edwin H. Land Medal jointly awarded by the Optical Society of America (OSA) and IS&T. In 2020, Allebach received the Johann Gutenberg Prize from IS&T.
