= Sergio Barbarossa =

Italian professor, engineer and inventor

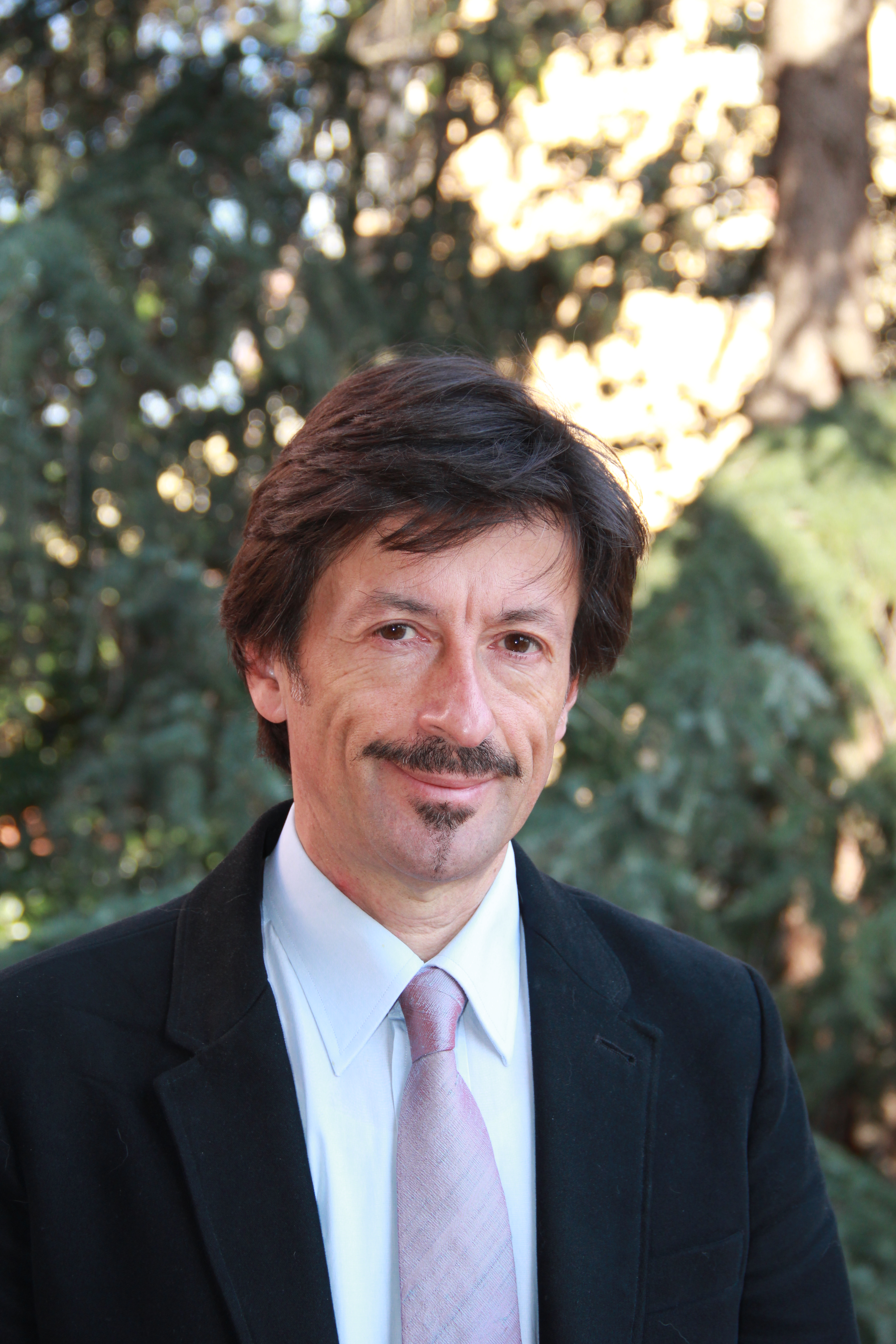
- Born: Rome, Italy
- Education: Sapienza University of Rome
- Scientific career
- Fields: Signal processing; Wireless communications; Radar; Network science; Data science
- Workplaces: Sapienza University of Rome
- Doctoral students: Anna Scaglione
- Website: sites.google.com/a/uniroma1.it/sergiobarbarossa/

Sergio Barbarossa is an Italian professor, engineer and inventor. He is a professor at Sapienza University of Rome, Italy.

== Research contribution ==
=== Signal Processing ===
Barbarossa, together with his students, introduced the framework of Topological Signal Processing, a general methodology used to analyze signals defined over a topological space, focusing on graphs, simplicial and cell complexes. This framework encompasses the conventional discrete signal processing as a very particular case. More specifically, he derived the uncertainty principle for signals defined over a graph and established the fundamental correspondence between uncertainty principle and sampling theory for graph signals. He proposed a new definition of the Fourier Transform for signals defined over a directed graph.

He derived an analytic model for the eigenfunctions of linear time-varying systems and introduced the product high-order ambiguity function, an algorithm useful to estimate the parameters of multi-component polynomial-phase signals. Barbarossa invented new ways to estimate the instantaneous frequency of continuous-phase signals embedded in noise, based on pattern analysis of their time-frequency representation.

=== Radar remote sensing ===
Together with Farina, he introduced time-frequency distributions in the analysis of synthetic-aperture radar signals (a subfield in radar remote sensing). The methods are useful, in particular, for the detection and imaging of objects moving on the Earth, observed from airborne or spaceborne synthetic aperture radars. The approach was later extended to multi-antenna systems, giving rise to space-time-frequency processing.

=== Wireless communications ===
Barbarossa and collaborators derived the optimal precoding matrices for wireless communication systems. The proposed strategies are particularly suitable for MIMO communication systems, with channel state information at the transmit side. He contributed to the introduction of game theory to wireless communications. Together with Fasano, Barbarossa introduced an optimal space-time coding technique, named Trace-Orthogonal Design, for MIMO systems with no channel information.

=== Mobile Edge Computing ===
In 2012, Barbarossa launched the idea of endowing small cell radio access points with cloud functionalities, to enable mobile users to get proximity access to cloud services within the Radio Access Network (RAN). That idea was funded by the FP7 European Project TROPIC and is now the core of Multi-Access Edge Computing (MEC). He published a series of papers on the joint optimization of communication and computation resources within the edge cloud.

=== Biologically inspired signal processing ===
He proposed various ways to design self-organizing mechanisms, especially suitable for wireless sensor networks, inspired to mechanisms taking place in nature, like self-synchronization of phase-coupled oscillators or swarming.

== Awards ==
He was named Fellow of the Institute of Electrical and Electronics Engineers (IEEE) in 2012 for contributions to signal processing, sensor networks, and wireless communications.

He was named Fellow of the European Association for Signal Processing (EURASIP) in 2015 for contributions to radar remote sensing, sensor and communication networks.

He received the EURASIP Technical Achievements Award in 2010 for contributions to synthetic aperture radar, wireless communications and networks.

He is the co-author of the papers that received the 2000, 2014, and 2020 IEEE Best Paper Awards from the IEEE Signal Processing Society.
