= Shlomo Shamai =

- שלמה שמאי (שיץ)
- Born: Lviv, Ukraine
- Education: Technion – Israel Institute of Technology
- Known for: Shannon Theory, Communication Channels
- Awards: Shannon Award (2011), van der Pol Gold Medal (1999), IEEE Donald G. Fink Prize Paper Award (2000), Rothschild Prize (2014), IEEE Richard W. Hamming Medal (2017)
- Scientific career
- Fields: Information Theory, Electrical Engineering
- Workplaces: Technion – Israel Institute of Technology

Shlomo Shamai (Hebrew: שלמה שמאי (שיץ)) is an Israeli information theorist who is a distinguished professor at the Department of Electrical engineering at the Technion − Israel Institute of Technology. Professor Shamai is an information theorist and winner of the 2011 Shannon Award.

Shlomo Shamai (Shitz) received the B.Sc., M.Sc., and Ph.D. degrees in electrical engineering from the Technion, in 1975, 1981 and 1986 respectively.

During 1975–1985 he was with the Israeli Communications Research Labs. Since 1986 he is with the Department of Electrical Engineering at the Technion—Israel Institute of Technology, where he is now the William Fondiller Professor of Telecommunications.

His research areas cover a wide spectrum of topics in information theory and statistical communications.

Shamai is an IEEE Fellow for contribution to Shannon theory as applied to the evaluation of the reliability of communication channels and a member of the International Union of Radio Science (URSI).

== Awards ==
- 2000 co-recipient of the IEEE Donald G. Fink Prize Paper Award
- 2011 Claude E. Shannon Award from the IEEE Information Theory Society
- 2017 IEEE Richard W. Hamming Medal
