= IEEE Eric E. Sumner award =

- Awarded for: Outstanding contributions to communications technology
- Presented by: Institute of Electrical and Electronics Engineers
- First award: 1995
- Website: IEEE Eric E. Sumner award

The IEEE Eric E. Sumner Award is a Technical Field Award of the IEEE. It was established by the IEEE board of directors in 1995. It may be presented annually, to an individual or a team of not more than three people, for outstanding contributions to communications technology. It is named in honor of Eric E. Sumner, 1991 IEEE President.

Recipients of this award receive a bronze medal, certificate, and honorarium.

== Recipients ==
List of award recipients and citation in chronological order:

- 2027 – Gerhard Fettweis
- 2026 – Biswanath Mukherjee
- 2025 – Thomas Louis Marzetta
- 2024 – Stephen B. Weinstein, Lenard J. Cimini, Jr, and Geoffrey Ye Li
- 2023 – Radia Perlman, Dell Technologies.
- 2022 – Lajos Hanzo, University of Southampton.
- 2021 – En-Hui Yang, University of Waterloo.
- 2020 – Theodore Rappaport, New York University.
- 2019 – Andrea Goldsmith, Stanford University.
- 2018 – William C. Lindsey, University of Southern California.
- 2017 – Peter W. Shor, Massachusetts Institute of Technology.
- 2016 – Shuo-Yen Robert Li, distinguished university professor, University of Electronic Science and Technology of China, Chengdu City, China and Raymond W. Yeung, professor, Chinese University of Hong Kong, Hong Kong, China and Ning Cai, professor, The State Key Laboratory of Integrated Services Networks (ISN), Xidian University Xi’an, Shaanxi, China For pioneering contributions to the field of network coding.
- 2015 – Sanjoy Mitter, professor, Massachusetts Institute of Technology, Cambridge, Massachusetts, USA For contributions to the unification of communications and control.
- 2014 – Alan Eli Willner, Steven & Kathryn Sample Chaired Professor in Engineering, University of Southern California, Los Angeles, CA, USA For contributions to high-capacity, multiplexed, optical communication systems.
- 2013 – Co-recipients: Vahid Tarokh, professor, School of Engineering and Applied Sciences, Harvard University, Cambridge, MA, USA, and Hamid Jafarkhani, professor, University of California, Irvine, CA, USA, and Siavash Alamouti, Group R&D Director, Vodafone, Vodafone House, Newbury, Great Britain For contributions to block signaling for multiple antennas
- 2012 – Co-recipients: Jack H. Winters, managing member, Jack Winters Communications LLC, and Andreas F. Molisch, full professor, Dept. of Electrical Engineering, University of Southern California, For contributions to the theory and application of multiple-antenna systems in wireless communication systems.
- 2011 – H. Vincent Poor, Michael Henry Strater University Professor and Dean of Engineering and Applied Science, Princeton University, For pioneering contributions to multiple-access communications.
- 2010 – Reinaldo Valenzuela, director of wireless communications, Alcatel-Lucent Bell Labs, For pioneering contributions to multi antennas systems and microwave propagation.
- 2009 – Roberto Padovani, executive vice president and chief technical officer. QUALCOMM, For pioneering innovations in wireless communications, particularly to the evolution of CDMA for wireless broadband data.
- 2008 – Thomas L. Koch, Professor of Electrical & Computer Engineering and Physics, Center for Optical Technologies, Lehigh University, For pioneering contributions to optoelectronic technologies and their implementation in optical communications systems.
- 2007 – Co-recipients: Michael G. Luby, CTO Digital Fountain Inc. and Amin Shokrollahi, Professor of Mathematics & Computer Science, École Polytechnique Fédérale de Lausanne, For bridging mathematics, internet design and mobile broadcasting as well as successful standardization.
- 2006 – Co-recipients: Robert A. Scholtz, Fred H. Cole Professor, University of Southern California and Moe Z. Win, associate professor, Massachusetts Institute of Technology, For pioneering contributions to ultra-wide band communications science and technology.
- 2005 – Krishan Sabnani, senior vice president, Networking Research, Bell Labs Lucent Technologies, For seminal contributions to networking protocols.
- 2004 – Gerard J. Foschini, Bell Laboratories/Lucent Technologies, For innovation and outstanding contributions to communication theory, in particular on multi-element antenna technology for high spectral-efficiency communications.
- 2003 – Co-Recipients: Werner Bux, manager, Dept of Communication Systems, IBM Zurich Research Laboratory and Hans R. Mueller For contributions to the design, development and standardization of the token-ring local area network.
- 2002 – John Midwinter, Pender Professor, Electrical Engineering Department, University College London and president, IEE, and Tsuneo Nakahara, Advisor and CEO, Sumitomo Electric Industries, For pioneering contributions to the physical understanding, manufacture, and deployment of optical fiber communications systems.
- 2001 – Not awarded
- 2000 – Not awarded
- 1999 – Howard Frank Director, Information Technology Office, Defense Advanced Research Projects Agency and Ivan T. Frisch, Provost, Polytechnic University, For innovative contributions to modelling and design of communications networks.
- 1998 – Donald L. Duttweiler, Debasis Mitra, and Man Mohan Sondhi, Lucent Technologies, For the conception and development of voice echo cancelers.
- 1997 – Jean-Pierre Coudreuse, Mitsubishi Information Technology Center, For fundamental contributions to broadband communications by Asynchronous Transfer Mode (ATM).

== See also ==
- List of engineering awards
- List of prizes named after people
