= Minerva Yeung =

American research scientist and educator

- Education: Purdue University (B.S. 1992); Princeton University (Ph.D. 1996)
- Scientific career
- Fields: Video processing; Multimedia information systems; Digital watermarking
- Workplaces: Intel; IBM T.J. Watson Research Center
- Thesis: Analysis, modeling and representation of digital video (1996)
- Doctoral advisor: Bede Liu

Minerva Yeung (simplified Chinese: 杨明儿; traditional Chinese: 楊明兒; pinyin: Yáng Míng'ér) is an American research scientist and educator best known for her work in video processing, multimedia information systems, and digital watermarking.

She was selected as an IEEE Fellow in 2019 "for leadership in multimedia signal processing." Yeung's research and work have been featured in publications The New York Times, Bloomberg News, and Sina News.

== Education ==
Yeung grew up in Hong Kong and entered Purdue University as a Chu Foundation Scholar, where she graduated with a Bachelor of Science degree in electrical engineering in 1992. She received a Ph.D. in electrical engineering at Princeton University in 1996 and was advised by professor emeritus Bede Liu. Her thesis was titled Analysis, modeling and representation of digital video.

== Career and research ==
After receiving her Ph.D. from Princeton University in 1996, Yeung worked as a research staff member at the IBM T. J. Watson Research Center, principal engineer and research manager at the Intel Microprocessor Research Labs, and led multiple teams at Intel. Her research specializes in video and signal processing, especially in topics of digital watermarking, video streaming, and image verification.

Her work has appeared in computer science journals and conferences including the Journal of Electronic Imaging, SIGGRAPH, Conference on Computer Vision and Pattern Recognition, IEEE Journal on Selected Areas in Communications, and IEEE Transactions on Circuits and Systems for Video Technology. She also owns 45 patents. One patent, summary frames, was featured in The New York Times as a new method for viewers to watch enough of television shows being broadcast without pausing longer than usual.

Yeung's work at the Intel Microprocessor Research Labs was mentioned in Robert Buderi's book Engines of Tomorrow: How the World's Best Companies Are Using Their Research Labs to Win the Future (2000).

More recently, Yeung has been more involved in the education world. Since 2014 she has worked on growing IvyCube (科藤园), an educational startup primarily based in Shanghai & Northern California.

In 2019, Yeung was elected to IEEE Fellow. She also served as the chair of the IEEE Jack S. Kilby Signal Processing Medal committee.

=== Selected awards and honors ===
- 2004 - One of Top 10 Winners of the Inaugural “China Outstanding IT Research Female” Award
- 2019 - IEEE Fellow
- 2020 - Purdue University Outstanding Electrical & Computer Engineers Award

=== Notable publications ===
- S. Craver, N. Memon, B. Yeo, & M. Yeung. Resolving rightful ownerships with invisible watermarking techniques: Limitations, attacks, and implications (1998).
- M. Yeung & F. Mintzer. An invisible watermarking technique for image verification (1997).
- M. Yeung & B. Yeo. Video visualization for compact presentation and fast browsing of pictorial content (1997).
