= Theodore Rappaport =

American engineer

Theodore (Ted) S. Rappaport
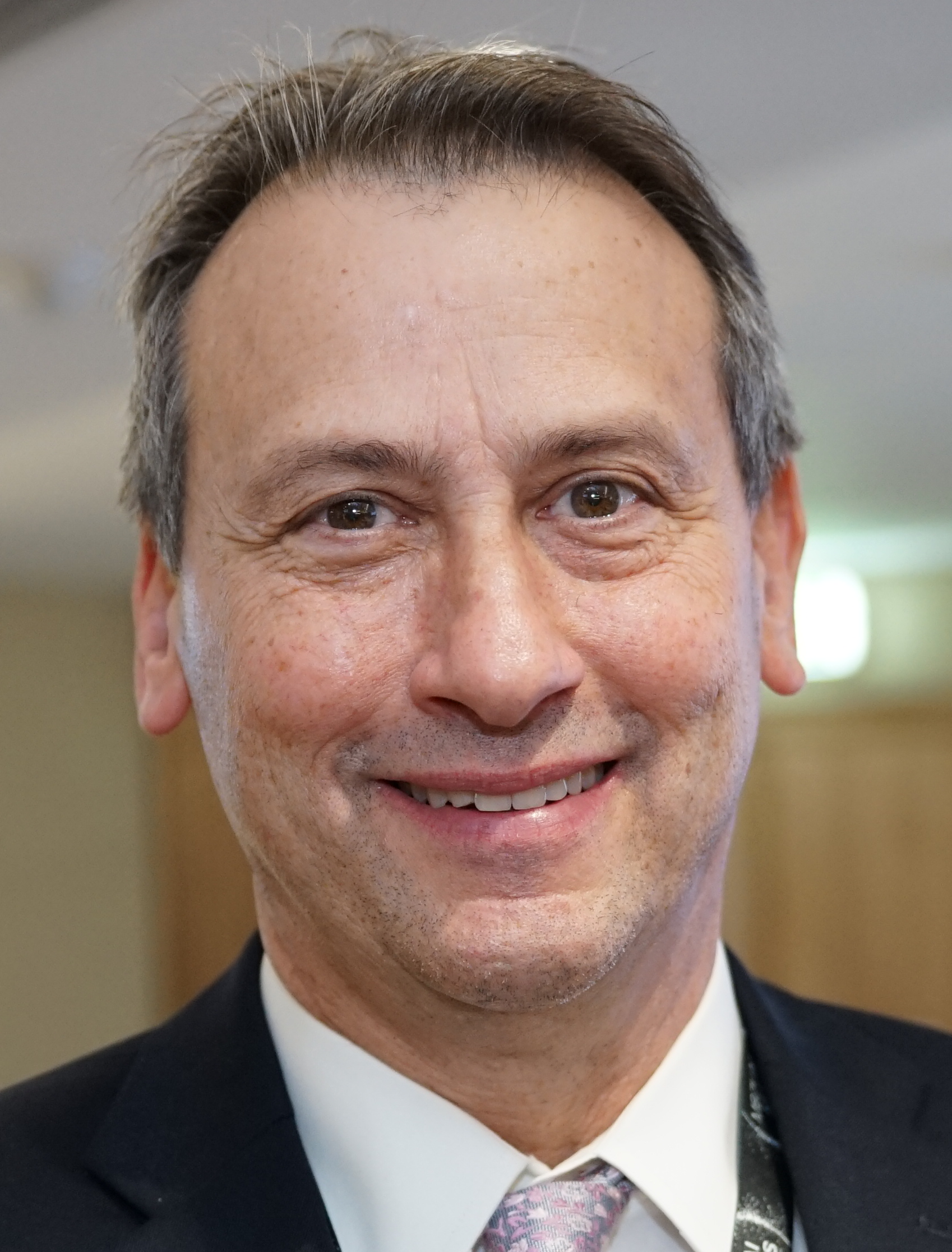
- Rappaport in 2026
- Born: November 26, 1960 (age 65); Brooklyn, New York
- Education: Purdue University
- Awards: IEEE Eric E. Sumner Award (2020); Wireless History Foundation Hall of Fame 2019; IEEE COMSOC Edwin H. Armstrong Award (2015); IET Sir Monty Finniston Medal (2011); ASEE F. E. Terman Outstanding Educator Award (2002); IEEE COMSOC Stephen O. Rice Paper Prize (1999)
- Scientific career
- Fields: Wireless communications
- Workplaces: New York University, The University of Texas at Austin, Virginia Tech
- Doctoral advisor: Clare D. McGillem

Theodore Scott Rappaport (born November 26, 1960, in Brooklyn, New York) is an American electrical engineer and the David Lee/Ernst Weber Professor of Electrical and Computer Engineering at New York University Tandon School of Engineering and founding director of NYU WIRELESS.

He has written several textbooks, including Wireless Communications: Principles and Practice and Millimeter Wave Wireless Communications (2014).

In the private sector he co-founded TSR Technologies, Inc. and Wireless Valley Communications, Inc. In the academic setting he founded academic wireless research centers at Virginia Tech, the University of Texas at Austin, and New York University.

His 2013 paper, "Millimeter Wave Mobile Communications for 5G Cellular: It Will Work!" has been called a founding document of 5G millimeter wave. He was elected a Fellow of the National Academy of Inventors in 2018, and to the Wireless Hall of Fame in 2019. He was also elected a member of the National Academy of Engineering in 2021 for contributions to the characterization of radio frequency propagation in millimeter wave bands for cellular communication networks.

== Early life and education ==
Ted Rappaport was born in Brooklyn, New York, and graduated from Lincoln High School in Cambridge City, Indiana.

Rappaport first developed an affinity for radio at age 5 when he would visit his grandfather, and together they would spend hours "tuning around, listening to Morse code and ship-to-shore" on his grandfather's Philco antique shortwave radio. From those early beginnings, he developed a fascination for wireless and "loves to experiment with antennas". At age 13, after he fractured his leg playing football his grandmother gave him a shortwave radio which helped keep him occupied while his leg was healing. He acquired his ham radio license, and while in high school began teaching adults Morse code.

Rappaport was among the first graduates of Purdue University's National Science Foundation Engineering Research Center (ERC) where he co-authored the proposal that resulted in the National Science Foundation award presented to Purdue by President Ronald Reagan. His work focused on indoor radio wave propagation that informed the IEEE 802.4L committee and led to the world’s first wireless lan product, WaveLAN, made by NCR.

== Career ==
=== Academic ===
Rappaport graduated from Purdue University with a BS, MS, and PhD in electrical engineering in 1982, 1984, and 1987, respectively. He joined the faculty of Virginia Tech in 1988 as an assistant professor and in 1990 founded the Mobile and Portable Radio Research Group (MPRG), one of the world's first academic research centers for the fledgling wireless communications field.

In 2002 Rappaport accepted the William and Bettye Nowlin professorship at The University of Texas at Austin (UT Austin).

In 2012, he joined New York University and Polytechnic University prior to the merger of the two universities to lead their wireless communications engineering and research initiatives as the David Lee/Ernst Weber Chair of Electrical Engineering while also holding professorships at NYU Courant Institute of Mathematical Sciences and NYU School of Medicine. He founded NYU WIRELESS one of the world’s first academic research centers to combine wireless engineering, computer science, and medicine.

He founded three academic wireless research centers at New York University (NYU WIRELESS), The University of Texas at Austin (WNCG), and Virginia Tech (MPRG). He wrote one of the first widely used wireless communications textbooks for academia and industry and has co-authored textbooks on simulation, smart antennas, and millimeter wave wireless communications. He is a co-inventor on more than 100 US and International patents that have issued or are pending and has advised or launched high-tech companies in the wireless communications and computing fields, and two university spin-off companies.

While on the faculty of Virginia Tech, Rappaport launched the Virginia Tech/MPRG Symposium on Wireless Personal Communications that was held on campus each summer. He received the Virginia Tech Alumni Award for Research Excellence in 1996, TSR Technologies invented some of the world's first software-defined radio (SDR) products, including the Cellscope 2000. In 2005, Rappaport along with other faculty at UT Austin received an IC2 Endowed Research Fellows appointment.

=== Private sector ===
While at Virginia Tech, Rappaport founded two wireless companies with his students. TSR Technologies, founded in 1989, was engaged in the manufacture of cellular radio/PCS software radios. He sold the company in 1993 to Allen Telecom. With Roger Skidmore, a graduate student of MPRG, he co-founded Wireless Valley Communications in 1995; the firm was an early developer of site-specific design and modeling products for the wireless local area network (WLAN) and indoor cellular/PCS. It was sold to Motorola in December 2005. At UT Austin, Rappaport founded the Wireless Networking and Communications Group (WNCG), and in 2011 received the Industry/University Collaborative Research Center (IUCRC) award sponsored by the National Science Foundation (NSF). Rappaport also launched the Texas Wireless Summit which became an annual fall event hosted by UT Austin’s wireless research program.

At New York University, he launched the Brooklyn 5G Summit (B5GS) with co-sponsorship from Nokia in 2013, an annual event held in April on the NYU-Poly Campus. His propagation measurements and channel modeling work for millimeter-wave wireless communications proved to the world that millimeter waves could be used for future mobile communication systems, and was cited in the Federal Communications Commission (FCC) Notice of Inquiry on the use of spectrum above 24 GHz for mobile communications (Spectrum Frontiers rulemaking proposal), and was featured in the September 2014 issue of IEEE Spectrum.

=== Other ===
Rappaport has served on the Technological Advisory Council of the Federal Communications Commission (TAC), assisted the governor and CIO of Virginia in formulating rural broadband initiatives for Internet access, testified before the US Congress and conducted research for National Science Foundation, Department of Defense, and other global telecommunications companies. Rappaport served as a technical advisor to Straightpath (NYSE: STRP). In April 2017, Straightpath entered into a definitive agreement to be acquired for $3.1 Billion.

His early work helped develop the first Wi-Fi standards and characterized multipath channels in a wide range of factory buildings in the 1300 MHz band when most wireless communication operated at lower frequencies. His research program at NYU has been developing fundamental theories and techniques for characterizing, modeling, and using knowledge of wireless channels for future potential in millimeter wave wireless communication systems.

Rappaport served as a senior editor of the IEEE Journal on Selected Areas in Communications (JSAC), and led in the creation of the IEEE Transactions on Wireless Communications. In 2006 he served on the Board of Governors of the IEEE Communications Society (ComSoc), has served consecutive terms on the Board of Governors for the IEEE Vehicular Technology Society (VTS) beginning in 2008 and served on the board of directors for the Marconi Society from 2012 to 2015.

Rappaport launched the Communications Engineering and Emerging Technologies (CEET) Book Series with Pearson/Prentice-Hall in 1996, and serves as Series Editor. The series has over 20 books in the field of communications technology.

== Personal life ==
Rappaport met Brenda Velasquez during his sophomore year; she was an agricultural engineering student also attending Purdue. They married in 1981 before his senior year at Purdue, and had three children together. They divorced in 2021.

== Honors and awards ==
- 1990 Marconi Young Scientist Award
- 1992 NSF Presidential Faculty Fellowship
- 1996 Virginia Tech Alumni Award for Research Excellence
- 1998 IEEE fellow for research contributions and educational leadership in the field of wireless communications.
- 1999 IEEE COMSOC Stephen O. Rice Prize
- 2000 Sarnoff Citation, Radio Club of America
- 2002 Fredrick E. Terman Outstanding Electrical Engineering Faculty Award, American Society for Engineering Education
- 2004 Outstanding Electrical and Computer Engineering Alumni Award, Purdue University
- 2005 IEEE Vehicular Technology Society – Stuart F. Meyer Award
- 2008 IEEE Communications Society Wireless Communications Technical Committee recognition award
- 2008 Austin Wireless Alliance (AWA) Wireless Industry Leadership Award
- 2010 Joe J. King award at UT Austin
- 2011 IET Sir Monty Finniston Medal for achievement in engineering and technology
- 2012 IEEE Education Society William E. Sayle Award for Achievement in Education
- 2013 Purdue University Distinguished Engineering Alumnus
- 2015 IEEE Donald G. Fink Paper Prize Award
- 2015 IEEE Communications Society Howard Edwin Armstrong achievement award
- 2013—2016 Distinguished Lecturer, IEEE Vehicular Technology Society
- 2017 IEEE VTS Neal Shepherd Memorial Best Propagation Paper Award
- 2018 Radio Club of America Armstrong Medal
- 2019 Fellow: National Academy of Inventors
- 2019 Elected to Wireless History Foundation Hall of Fame
- 2020 IEEE Eric E. Sumner award
- 2021 Elected to National Academy of Engineering
- 2023 IEEE VTS Neal Shephard Memorial Best Propagation Paper Award
- 2024 IEEE Vehicular Technology Society Hall of Fame
- 2024 Hagler Fellow at Texas A&M University
- 2025 ACM Fellow

== Books ==
- T. S. Rappaport, R. Heath, R. Daniels, J. Murdock, Millimeter Wave Wireless Communications, Prentice Hall, 2015
- W. H. Tranter, K. S. Shanmugan, T. S. Rappaport, K. L. Kosbar, Principles of Communication Systems Simulation, Prentice Hall, 2004
- T. S. Rappaport, Wireless Communications: Principles and Practice, Second Edition, Prentice Hall, 2002
- M. J. Feuerstein, T. S. Rappaport, Wireless Personal Communications, Kluwer Academic Publishers, 1993
- T. S. Rappaport, B. D. Woerner, J. H. Reed, Wireless Personal Communications: Trends and Challenges, Kluwer Academic Publishers, 1994
- B. D. Woerner, T. S. Rappaport, J. H. Reed, Wireless Personal Communications: Research Developments, Kluwer Academic Publishers, 1995
- T. S. Rappaport. Wireless Communications: Principle and Practice Prentice Hall, 1996
- T. S. Rappaport, B. D. Woerner, J. H. Reed, Wireless Personal Communications: The Evolution of Personal Communications Systems, Kluwer Academic Publishers, 1996
- J. H. Reed, B. D. Woerner, T. S. Rappaport, Wireless Personal Communications: Advances in Coverage and Capacity, Kluwer Academic Publishers, 1996
- T. S. Rappaport, B. D. Woerner, J. H. Reed, W. H. Tranter, Wireless Personal Communications: Improving Capacity, Services, and Reliability, Kluwer Academic Publishers, 1997
- W. H. Tranter, T. S. Rappaport, B. D. Woerner, J. H. Reed, Wireless Personal Communications: Emerging Technologies for Enhanced Communications, Kluwer Academic Publishers, 1999
- W. H. Tranter, B. D. Woerner, T. S. Rappaport, J. H. Reed, Wireless Personal Communications: Channel Modeling and Systems Engineering, Kluwer Academic Publishers, 2000
- W. H. Tranter, B. D. Woerner, J. H. Reed, T. S. Rappaport, M. Robert, Wireless Personal Communications Bluetooth Tutorial and Other Technologies, Kluwer Academic Publishers, 2001
- Theodore S Rappaport, Smart Antennas: Adaptive Arrays, Algorithms, & Wireless Position Location, 1998
- Joseph C Liberti; Theodore S Rappaport Smart Antennas for Wireless Communications: IS-95 and Third Generation CDMA Applications Prentice-Hall, 1999
- Theodore S Rappaport, Cellular Radio & Personal Communications: A Book of Selected Readings, 1995
- Theodore S Rappaport, Cellular Radio & Personal Communications: Advanced Selected Readings, 1996
