= Thomas Kailath =

Indian-American engineer

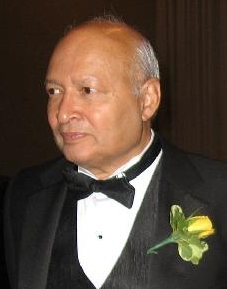
- Kailath in 2007 at the IEEE Medal of Honor ceremony.
- Born: June 7, 1935 (age 91); Poona, Bombay Presidency, British India
- Education: Government College of Engineering at Pune (B.S.); Massachusetts Institute of Technology (M.S), (ScD)
- Awards: IEEE James H. Mulligan, Jr. Education Medal (1995); Claude E. Shannon Award (2000); IEEE Medal of Honor (2007); Padma Bhushan (2009); BBVA Foundation Frontiers of Knowledge Award (2009); National Medal of Science (2012); Marconi Society Lifetime Achievement Award (2017); Fellow of the Royal Society, United Kingdom (2009)
- Scientific career
- Fields: Control theory; Information theory
- Workplaces: Stanford University
- Thesis: Communication via randomly varying channels (1961)
- Doctoral advisor: John Wozencraft
- Doctoral students: Babak Hassibi; Ali H. Sayed; John Cioffi

Thomas Kailath (born June 7, 1935) is an Indian-American electrical engineer, information theorist, control engineer, entrepreneur and the Hitachi America Professor of Engineering emeritus at Stanford University. Professor Kailath has authored several books, including the well-known Linear Systems.

Kailath was elected as a member of the US National Academy of Engineering in 1984 for outstanding contributions in prediction, filtering, and signal processing, and for leadership in engineering. Kailath is listed as an ISI highly cited researcher and is generally recognized as one of the preeminent figures of twentieth-century electrical engineering.

== Biography ==
Kailath was born in 1935 in Pune, Maharashtra, India, to a Malayali family from Kerala. He studied at St. Vincent's High School, Pune and received his Bachelor's degree in telecommunications engineering from the Government College of Engineering, University of Pune in 1956. He earned his Master's degree in 1959 and doctorate (ScD) in 1961 from the Massachusetts Institute of Technology (MIT), becoming the first India-born student to receive a doctorate in electrical engineering from the institution.

Kailath is the Hitachi America Professor of Engineering emeritus at Stanford University, where he has supervised about 80 Ph.D. theses. Kailath's research work has encompassed linear systems, estimation and control theory, signal processing, information theory and semiconductor device fabrication.

In addition to academic work. Kailath has also co-founded several high-technology companies, including Integrated Systems (founded in 1980 and merged with WindRiver Systems in 1999), Numerical Technologies (founded in 1995 and acquired by Synopsys), and Excess Bandwidth Corporation (founded in 1998 and acquired by Virata Corporation in 2000, which itself merged with Globespan in 2001 and is now Conexant).

== Honors and Recognition ==
Kailath was elected a Fellow of the Institute of Electrical and Electronics Engineers (IEEE) in 1970. He is a member of the US National Academy of Engineering (NAE), the US National Academy of Sciences (NAS), American Academy of Arts and Sciences (AAAS), the Indian National Academy of Engineering and the Silicon Valley Engineering Hall of Fame.

Kailath was awarded the 2007 IEEE Medal of Honor for "exceptional development of powerful algorithms in the fields of communications, computing, control and signal processing", elected Fellow of the Royal Society in 2009, the 2006 IEEE Jack S. Kilby Signal Processing Medal, the 1996 IEEE Donald G. Fink Prize Paper Award (together with Ali H. Sayed), and the 1986 John R. Ragazzini Award.

Kailath was honored with the Padma Bhushan award in 2009 by the Government of India for his contributions to Science and Engineering. He was also awarded the 2009 BBVA Foundation Frontiers of Knowledge Award in Information and Communication Technology "for creating knowledge with transformative impact on the information and communication technologies that permeate everyday life".

In 2012, Kailath was a recipient of the National Medal of Science, presented by President Barack Obama in 2014 for "transformative contributions to the fields of information and system science, for distinctive and sustained mentoring of young scholars, and for translation of scientific ideas into entrepreneurial ventures that have had a significant impact on industry."

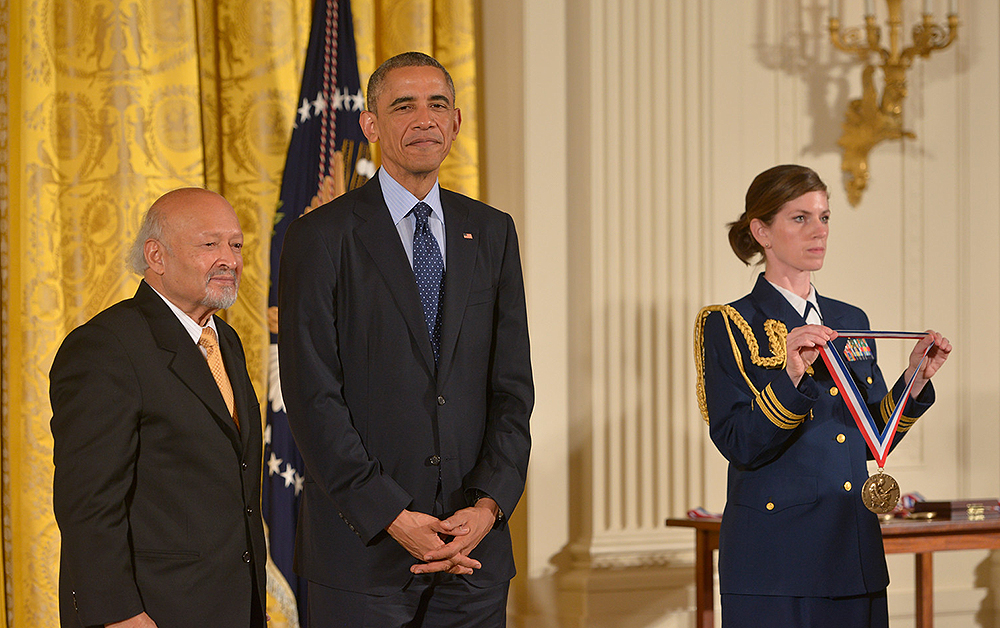
Thomas Kailath receiving the National Medal of Science at the White House in 2012

The Marconi Society honored Kailath in 2017 with the Lifetime Achievement Award for "his many transformative contributions to information and system science and his sustained mentoring and development of new generations of scientists."

== Personal ==
Kailath was married to Sarah (Jacob) Kailath from 1962 until her death in 2008, and they had four children: Ann (wife of MIT professor George Verghese), Paul, Priya and Ryan.

In 2013, Kailath married Dr. Anuradha Luther Maitra, retired economics professor, trustee and former president of the UC Santa Cruz Foundation Board, and former CEO of Floreat, Inc. In 2022 a gift from the couple created the Anuradha Luther Maitra and Thomas Kailath Endowed Professorship in South Asian Studies at UC Santa Cruz to advance "research and discourse dedicated to South Asia and the South Asian diaspora".

Kailath is the brother-in-law of journalist T. J. S. George, who is also a recipient of the Padma Bhushan.

== Publications ==
- 1979, Linear Systems (Prentice-Hall Information and System Science Series) (1979, Prentice Hall, ISBN 978-0-13-536961-6)
- 1987, Indefinite-Quadratic Estimation and Control: A Unified Approach to H^{2} and H^{$\infty$} Theories (Studies in Applied and Numerical Mathematics) with Ali H. Sayed & Babak Hassibi (1987, Society for Industrial & Applied Mathematics, ISBN 978-0-89871-411-1)
- 1997, Discrete Neural Computation: A Theoretical Foundation with Kai-Yeung Siu & Vwani Roychowdhury (1997, Prentice Hall, ISBN 978-0-13-300708-4)
- 2000, Linear Estimation with Ali H. Sayed & Babak Hassibi (2000, Prentice Hall, ISBN 978-0-13-022464-4)
