= Robert A. Scholtz =

American electrical engineer

- Born: c. 1936 (age 89–90)
- Education: Stanford University; University of Cincinnati
- Scientific career
- Fields: Electrical engineering
- Workplaces: University of Southern California
- Doctoral advisor: Norman Abramson
- Doctoral students: Robert M. Gray; Moe Z. Win; Ranjan Kumar Mallik

Robert Arno Scholtz (born c. 1936) is a distinguished professor of electrical engineering at University of Southern California, known for ultra-wideband and spread spectrum communications.

A 1958 graduate and distinguished alumnus from University of Cincinnati, he obtained his PhD at Stanford University in 1964. Starting his career at Hughes Aircraft, he joined the University of Southern California in 1963. His research work centers on ultra wideband theory and wireless networks. He has also contributed extensively to spread spectrum communication and synchronization.

Scholtz is a life fellow of the IEEE (1980) for contributions to the theory and design of synchronizable codes for digital communications and radar systems. He was also elected a member of the National Academy of Engineering (2009) for contributions to the fields of ultra-wideband and spread-spectrum communications. He received the IEEE Donald G. Fink Prize Paper Award (1984), and the IEEE Eric E. Sumner Award (2006), together with Moe Z. Win.

His past PhD students include information theorist Robert M. Gray, professor at MIT, Moe Z. Win and professor Ranjan Kumar Mallik at Indian Institute of Technology, Delhi, India.

== Books ==
- Spread Spectrum Communications (with M. K. Simon et al.), Computer Science Press, 1984.
- Spread Spectrum Communications Handbook (with M. K. Simon et al.), McGraw Hill, 1994.
- Basic Concepts in Information Theory and Coding (with S. W. Golomb and R. Peile), Plenum Press, 1994
