= EURASIP Journal on Advances in Signal Processing =

- Discipline: Signal processing, image processing, pattern recognition, robotics
- Language: English

Publication details
- Former name: EURASIP Journal on Applied Signal Processing
- History: 2001–present
- Publisher: SpringerOpen
- Open access: Yes
- Impact factor: 1.73 (2017)

Standard abbreviations
- ISO 4: EURASIP J. Adv. Signal Process.

Indexing
- ISSN: 1687-6172

Links
- Journal homepage

EURASIP Journal on Advances in Signal Processing is a peer-reviewed open access scientific journal covering theoretical and practical aspects of signal processing in new and emerging technologies. The scope includes: communications, networking, sensors and actuators, radar and sonar, medical imaging, biomedical applications, remote sensing, consumer electronics, computer vision, pattern recognition, robotics, fiber optic sensing/transducers, industrial automation, transportation, stock market and financial analysis, seismography, and avionics.

It is published by the EUSIPCO association.
