= Debasis Mitra =

Indian-American mathematician (born 1944)

- Born: November 3, 1944 (age 81); Kolkata
- Citizenship: United States
- Education: University of London
- Scientific career
- Fields: communication systems, control theory, queueing theory
- Workplaces: Bell Labs, Columbia University
- Thesis: Studies in microwave spectroscopy (1968)

Debasis Mitra (born November 3, 1944, in Kolkata) is an Indian-American mathematician, known for his numerous contributions to the theory of communication systems, control theory and queueing theory.

He got his B.Sc. (1964) and Ph.D. (1968) in electrical engineering from University of London, on an Atomic Energy Research fellowship (1965–67), while he was simultaneously affiliated with the Control systems center at the University of Manchester. His work focused on control of nuclear power systems. He then joined Bell Labs as a member of the technical staff (1968), working on semiconductor networks, diffusion models for service adoption and traffic modeling. Mitra was head of Mathematics of Networks and Systems research division (1986–99), and was vice president of the math and algorithmic science center. Mitra has served as editor and as part of the editorial board of numerous scientific publications, and was visiting professor at University of California (1984).

In 2003, Mitra was elected a member of the National Academy of Engineering for his "contributions to the modeling, analysis and design of communication networks." He retired from Bell Labs in 2013 and joined the Columbia University Electrical Engineering department. His current research interests are in the scientific foundations of policy that impact engineers and engineering systems, especially in models, analyses and syntheses of organizational and individual interactions. Instances are network neutrality, network economics, and the science and management of innovations and knowledge-creation.

He holds 21 patents, and, as of November 11, 2015, his publications have been cited 11,332 times. His h-index is 55.

== Awards ==
- Premium award for best publication (IEEE, England, 1967)
- IEEE Fellow (1988)
- Steven O. Rice Prize Paper (1992) for his paper Asymptotically Optimal Design of Congestion Control for High Speed Data Networks.
- Bell labs fellow (1998)
- IEEE Eric E. Sumner Award for the contributions to echo cancellation (1998)
- Elected to the National Academy of Engineering for contributions to communications systems (2003)
- ACM SIGMETRICS Achievement Award for his fundamental contributions to the modeling, analysis, and design of communication networks (2012)
