= Bede Liu =

Taiwanese-American electrical engineer (1934–2026)

- 劉必治
- Born: September 25, 1934; Shanghai, China
- Died: May 7, 2026 (aged 91); Plainsboro Township, New Jersey, U.S.
- Education: National Taiwan University (BS); New York University (MS, PhD)
- Awards: IEEE Fourier Award for Signal Processing; IEEE Jack S. Kilby Signal Processing Medal
- Scientific career
- Fields: Electrical engineering
- Workplaces: Princeton University
- Thesis: Techniques of Network Approximation in the Time Domain (1960)
- Doctoral advisor: John G. Truxal
- Doctoral students: Jan P. Allebach; Charles Bouman; George Cybenko; Peter Franaszek; Bob Kahn; David C. Munson; Min Wu; Minerva Yeung

Bede Liu (Chinese: 劉必治; pinyin: Liú Bìzhì; September 25, 1934 – May 7, 2026) was a Taiwanese-American electrical engineer. He was a professor emeritus at Princeton University.

== Life and career ==
Bede Liu was born in Shanghai, China, on September 25, 1934. He earned a B.S. in electrical engineering from National Taiwan University in 1954. He then earned a Master of Engineering (M.E.) in 1956 and Ph.D. in 1960, both from the Polytechnic Institute of Brooklyn (now New York University School of Engineering) in electrical engineering.

Liu received the IEEE Fourier Award for Signal Processing. He was elected a member of the National Academy of Engineering in 2002 for contributions to the analysis and implementation of digital signal processing algorithms. He was also elected a member of Academia Sinica in 2006. He has a number of patents to his credits.

His doctoral students included two members of the U.S. National Academy of Engineering, 25 IEEE Fellows, 4 IEEE Millennium medalists.

Liu died after a brief illness in Plainsboro Township, New Jersey, on May 7, 2026, at the age of 91.
