= Sonthi =

Sonthi may refer to:

- Sonthi Boonyaratglin (born 1946), former Commander-in-Chief of the Royal Thai Army
- Sonthi River, tributary of the Pa Sak River

== See also ==
- Amphoe Lam Sonthi, the easternmost district of Lopburi Province, central Thailand
- Sondhi
