= Krishan Sabnani =

Indian-American networking researcher (born 1954)

- Born: New Delhi, India
- Education: Indian Institute of Technology Delhi, Columbia University
- Awards: NAE Member (2021); NAI Fellow (2022); IEEE Sumner Award (2005); IEEE McDowell Award (2005); NJ Inventors Hall of Fame (2014); Bell Labs Fellow (1998); ACM Fellow (2001); IEEE Fellow (1998); Three Thomas Alva Edison Patent Awards; Leonard G. Abraham Prize Paper Award (1991)
- Scientific career
- Fields: Communication protocols, Computer networks, Telecommunications, Wireless Networking
- Workplaces: Bell Labs. Johns Hopkins University, Columbia University
- Website: https://engineering.jhu.edu/faculty/krishan-sabnani/

Krishan Sabnani (born 1954 in New Delhi) is an Indian-American networking researcher. He has made many seminal contributions to the Internet infrastructure design, protocol design, and wireless networks. Krishan (with T. V. Lakshman and T. Woo) made a breakthrough in Internet re-design. The main idea behind this work was to separate control functions and complex software from the forwarding portions on Internet routers. This work made it possible for forwarding technologies (e.g., different link layer and switching protocols) to evolve and be deployed independently from control protocols (e.g., routing, security). This contribution is a precursor to the current Software Defined Networking (SDN) revolution. A patent based on this work won the 2010 Edison Patent Award.

Krishan received his undergraduate degree in electrical engineering from the Indian Institute of Technology (IIT), Delhi. He completed his PhD in reliable multicasting at Columbia University. Upon his graduation from Columbia University in 1981, Krishan joined Bell Labs, Murray Hill, New Jersey, as a member of technical staff and was promoted to department head in 1993. He was named VP of networking research in 2000.

Krishan was vice president of networking research at Bell Labs from Jan. 2000 to Sept. 2013. In that role, he managed all networking research in Bell Labs, comprising nine departments in seven countries: USA, France, Germany, Ireland, India, Belgium, and South Korea. Krishan retired from Bell Labs in Jan 2017. He received an award upon his retirement - appointment as Ambassador-at-large for Bell Labs. Krishan is the first person to receive this award.

Krishan is currently a Professor of Computer Science at Johns Hopkins University. He is also a part-time chief technologist at CACI.

== Honors and awards ==
- Member, National Academy of Engineering
- Fellow, National Academy of Inventors
- Ambassador-at-large for Bell Labs
- 2005 IEEE Eric E. Sumner Award
- 2005 IEEE W. Wallace McDowell Award.
- The 2005, 2009 and 2010 Thomas Alva Edison Patent Awards from the R&D Council of New Jersey.
- Inducted into the NJ Inventors of Fame in 2014
- Bell Labs Fellow, Fellow of the Institute of Electrical and Electronics Engineers (IEEE) and Fellow of the Association for Computing Machinery (ACM).
- 2005 Distinguished Alumni Award from Indian Institute of Technology, New Delhi, India.
- 1991 Leonard G. Abraham Prize Paper Award from the IEEE Communications Society for "Design and Implementation of a High-Speed Transport Protocol," published in IEEE Trans. on Communications, Nov. 1990.
- President of India's Gold Medal, 1975 . Institution of Engineers (India) Gold Medal, 1975.
