= Andreas Hierlemann =

German chemist and biosystems engineering professor (born 1964)

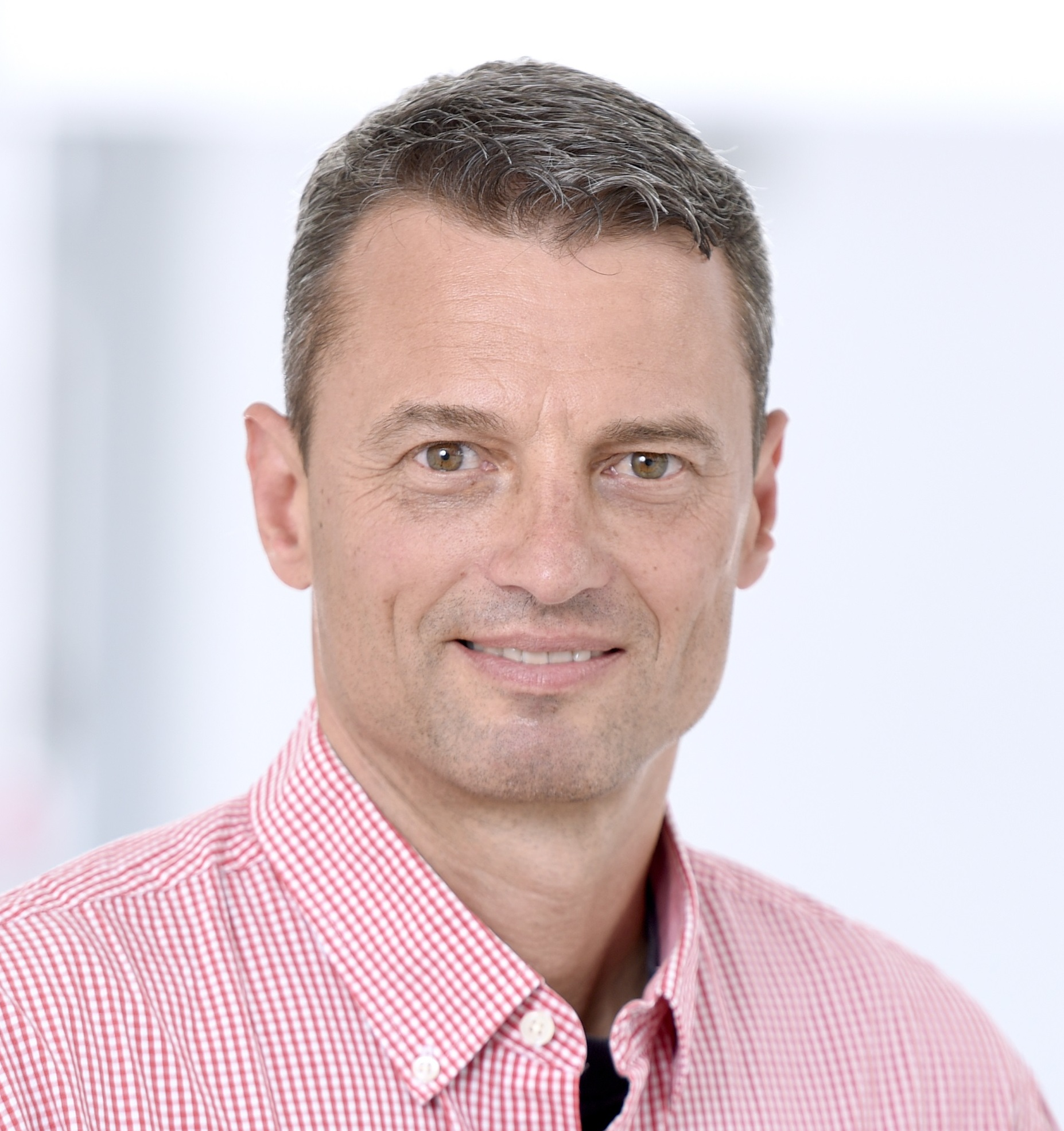
- Hierlemann in 2016
- Born: 17 August 1964 (age 62)
- Known for: Development of CMOS chemical and biomicrosensors, CMOS high-density microelectrode arrays
- Scientific career
- Fields: Biosystems engineering
- Workplaces: ETH Zurich

Andreas Hierlemann (17 August 1964) is a German chemist and professor of Biosystems Engineering at ETH Zurich. He is known for his work in the field of CMOS-based chemical and biomicrosensors and high-density microelectrode arrays.

== Life ==
From 1985 to 1991, Hierlemann studied chemistry at the University of Tübingen, Germany. He received a PhD from the University of Tübingen in 1996 for his work on Mass-sensitive detection of organic volatiles using modified polysiloxanes. 1997–98 he held postdoctoral positions at Texas A&M University in College Station, Texas, USA, and at Sandia National Laboratories in Albuquerque, New Mexico, USA. From 1999 to 2004 he was research team leader at the Physical Electronics Laboratory in the Department of Physics of ETH Zürich, Switzerland, becoming associate professor for microsensors in 2004. In 2008 he was named full professor of Biosystems Engineering, Department of Biosystems Science and Engineering of ETH Zurich in Basel, Switzerland.

== Scientific contribution ==
Hierlemann's research initially was mostly in the area of chemical sensors and microsensors. In particular, he worked on the detection of organic volatiles and the discrimination of enantiomers in the gas phase. He then adopted microtechnology and, specifically, CMOS-based microelectronics to devise complex microsensor systems. The current interdisciplinary research is rooted in engineering and physics and targeted at questions in biology and medicine. It includes the development of CMOS-based integrated chemical and biomicrosystems, as well as bioelectronics and high-density microelectrode arrays. The high-density microelectrode arrays are used for fundamental research in information processing and signaling characteristics of neurons or brain cells. Moreover, the research group is engaged in the development of microfluidics for investigating the characteristics of single cells and microtissues.

Applications of Hierlemann's and his group's technologies are in the fields of systems biology, drug testing, personalized medicine, and neuroscience.

== Awards ==
- 2005 IEEE Donald G. Fink Prize Paper Award
- 2008 Eurosensors Fellow
- 2011 DECHEMA Award of the Max Buchner Research Foundation
- 2024 Springer Nature Test of Time Award

== Publication list ==
- Thomson Reuters ResearcherID
- Andreas Hierlemann publications indexed by Google Scholar
