= Min Wu =

Chinese-American electrical engineer

Min Wu (Chinese: 吴旻; born 1974) is a Chinese-American electrical engineer and an expert in signal processing, digital forensics, digital watermarking, and steganography. She is the Christine Yurie Kim Eminent Professor in Information Technology and Associate Dean for Graduate Affairs in the A. James Clark School of Engineering at the University of Maryland, College Park.She is the former editor-in-chief of IEEE Signal Processing Magazine, former chair of the IEEE Information Forensics and Security Technical Committee, and the president of the IEEE Signal Processing Society.

== Education and career ==
Wu earned double bachelor's degrees in economics and in electrical engineering at Tsinghua University in 1996. She completed a Ph.D. at Princeton University in 2001, with the dissertation Multimedia Data Hiding supervised by Bede Liu.

She joined the Department of Electrical and Computer Engineering at the University of Maryland, College Park, as an assistant professor in 2001. She was promoted to associate professor in 2006 and full professor in 2011, and named the Christine Yurie Kim Eminent Professor in 2022. She has been associate dean for graduate affairs in the A. James Clark School of Engineering since 2019.

Wu chaired the IEEE Information Forensics and Security Technical Committee for 2012–2013, and served as editor-in-chief of IEEE Signal Processing Magazine from 2015 to 2017. She is president of the IEEE Signal Processing Society for the 2024–2025 term.

== Books ==
Wu is the coauthor of:

- Multimedia Data Hiding (Springer, 2002)
- Multimedia Fingerprinting Forensics for Traitor Tracing (Hindawi, 2005)

== Recognition ==
Wu was elected as an IEEE Fellow in 2011, "for contributions to multimedia security and forensics". She was named as a Fellow of the American Association for the Advancement of Science in 2017, "for distinguished contributions to the field of signal processing, particularly for multimedia security and forensics". She joined the National Academy of Inventors as a fellow in 2019.
