= Lajos Hanzo =

Engineer and researcher

- Born: Hungary
- Education: Technical University of Budapest
- Known for: Wireless and Quantum Communications
- Awards: FREng; FIEEE; Hungarian Academy of Sciences; IET Achievement Medals; IEEE Eric E. Sumner Award
- Scientific career
- Fields: Wireless Communications; Quantum Communications
- Workplaces: University of Southampton

Lajos Hanzo is a Hungarian born British electronics engineer who is a professor and Chair of Telecommunications at the University of Southampton, and also a former Editor-in-Chief of IEEE Press.

== Education ==
Lajos was born in Hungary and studied at the Technical University of Budapest, graduating with his master's degree in Electronics in 1976 and his Ph.D. in 1983. In 1980–81, he conducted research at the University of Erlangen–Nuremberg, Germany. He then returned to Hungary and, in 1986, moved to University of Southampton, UK.

== Career ==
In 1987, he was appointed as a Lecturer (Assistant Professor) at the University of Southampton and, in 1998, he was appointed to the Chair of Telecommunications. In 2004, he received his Doctor of Science degree for his thesis based on 11 research monographs and 70 journal papers.

Lajos is a prolific educator and researcher. He has published 2000+ technical papers at IEEE Xplore and co-authored 19 John Wiley - IEEE Press research monographs. His research include multiple-input and multiple-output (MIMO) systems, orthogonal frequency-division multiplexing (OFDM), visible light communication (VLC), turbo coding, and quantum communications conceived for flawless tele-presence.

He is the holder of two consecutive European Research Council (ERC) Advanced Grants stretching over the past decade.

He has served several terms on the Board of Vehicular Technology Society (VTS) Governors of the IEEE. He is also a frequent keynote speaker at IEEE conferences.

== Awards ==
Lajos was elected a Fellow of the Royal Academy of Engineering in 2004. He received the Sir Monty Finniston Award (IET Achievement Medals) in 2008. He is a Fellow of IEEE (2004) for contributions to adaptive wireless communication systems, Fellow of IET, and Fellow of EURASIP (2011). He received Honorary Doctorates from the Technical University of Budapest in 2009 and from the University of Edinburgh in 2015. In 2016, he was elected as a Foreign Member of the Hungarian Academy of Sciences. In 2022, he was bestowed upon the IEEE Eric E. Sumner Award for seminal contributions to adaptive wireless communications.

== Books and Publications ==
Lajos has co-authored 19 books related to generations of wireless communications standards, flawless voice- and video-compression, turbo coding, multi-carrier code-division multiple access (MC-CDMA), OFDM, MIMO systems, just to name a few. He has published 2000+ technical papers at IEEE Xplore. He is an ISI highly cited researcher.
