= Moe Z. Win =

Burmese-American scientist

- Born: Burma
- Education: Texas A&M University (BS); University of Southern California (MS, PhD)
- Scientific career
- Fields: Electrical engineering
- Workplaces: Massachusetts Institute of Technology
- Doctoral advisor: Robert A. Scholtz

Moe Z. Win (Burmese: မိုးဇော်ဝင်း, pronounced [mó zɔ̀ wɪ́ɰ̃]) is a Burmese-American mathematician and electrical engineer known for his work in wireless communications. He is currently a professor at the Massachusetts Institute of Technology.

His current research topics include network localization and navigation, network interference exploitation, and quantum information science. He has served the IEEE Communications Society as an elected Member-at-Large on the Board of Governors, as elected Chair of the Radio Communications Committee, and as an IEEE Distinguished Lecturer. Recently, he served on the SIAM Diversity Advisory Committee.

His awards and recognitions include the following:

- 2004 IEEE Fellow – "For contributions to wideband wireless transmission".
- 2006 co-recipient (with Professor Robert A. Scholtz of USC, who was also his PhD advisor) of IEEE Eric E. Sumner Award for outstanding contributions to communications technology – "For pioneering contributions to ultra-wide band communications science and technology".
- 2007 Global Wireless Education Consortium Wireless Educator of the Year Award.
- 2011 IEEE Kiyo Tomiyasu Award (IEEE Institution-level Award) – "For contributions to high-speed reliable communications using optical and wireless channels".
