= Babak Hassibi =

American electrical engineer

- Born: 1967 (age 58–59); Tehran, Iran
- Education: Stanford University; University of Tehran
- Awards: Presidential Early Career Award for Scientists and Engineers (PECASE) (2003); David and Lucille Packard Fellowship for Science and Engineering (2003); Al Marai Award (2009)
- Scientific career
- Fields: Communication theory; Information theory; Signal processing; Control theory
- Workplaces: California Institute of Technology; Bell Laboratories; Stanford University
- Doctoral advisor: Thomas Kailath

Babak Hassibi (Persian: بابک حسیبی), born in 1967 in Tehran, Iran, is an Iranian-American electrical engineer, computer scientist, and applied mathematician who is the inaugural Mose and Lillian S. Bohn Professor of Electrical Engineering and Computing and Mathematical Sciences at the California Institute of Technology (Caltech). From 2013 to 2016 he was the Gordon M Binder/Amgen Professor of Electrical Engineering. During 2008-2015 he was the Executive Officer of Electrical Engineering and Associate Director of Information Science and Technology.

He received a B.S. degree in electrical engineering from the University of Tehran in 1989 and an M.S. and Ph.D. degree in electrical engineering from Stanford University in 1993 and 1996, respectively. At Stanford, his adviser was Thomas Kailath. He was a Research Associate in the Information Systems Laboratory at Stanford University during 1996-98 and was a Member of the Technical Staff in the Mathematics of Communications Research Group at Bell Laboratories from 1998 to 2000. Since 2001 he has been at Caltech.

His research is broadly in communications, signal processing and control. Among other works, he has shown the h-infinity-optimality of the least mean squares filter, used group-theoretic techniques to design space-time codes and frames and to study entropic vectors, performed information-theoretic studies of various wireless networks (such as determining the capacity of the MIMO wiretap channel), constructed tree codes for interactive communication and control, developed various algorithms and performance analyses for compressed sensing and structured signal recovery, studied epidemic spread in complex networks, and co-invented real-time DNA microarrays.

He is the recipient of the 2003 Presidential Early Career Award for Scientists and Engineers (PECASE), the 2003 David and Lucille Packard Fellowship for Science and Engineering, the Okawa Foundation Research Grant in Information Sciences in 2002 and the National Science Foundation Career Award in 2002.

His grandfather was the late Kazem Hassibi, an Iranian academic, parliamentarian, National Front leader, and oil adviser (Under-Secretary of Finance, 1952 to 1954) to Mohammad Mosaddegh during Iran's oil nationalization.
