= IEEE Magnetics Letters =

- Discipline: Magnetism, magnetic materials
- Language: English
- Edited by: Massimiliano d'Aquino

Publication details
- History: 2010–present
- Publisher: IEEE Magnetics Society
- Frequency: Upon acceptance
- Open access: Hybrid

Standard abbreviations
- ISO 4: IEEE Magn. Lett.

Indexing
- ISSN: 1949-307X
- OCLC no.: 649659684

Links
- Journal homepage; Online access

IEEE Magnetics Letters is a peer-reviewed scientific journal that was started in January 2010. It covers the physics and engineering of magnetism, magnetic materials, applied magnetics, design and application of magnetic devices, biomagnetics, magneto-electronics, and spin electronics. It publishes short articles of up to five pages in length and is a hybrid open access journal. The editor-in-chief is Massimiliano d'Aquino (University of Naples Federico II).
