= Rabab Ward =

Lebanese-Canadian electrical engineer

Rabab Kreidieh Ward
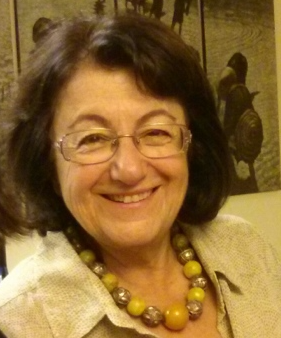
- Scientific career
- Fields: Electrical engineering, signal processing
- Workplaces: University of British Columbia

Rabab Kreidieh Ward FCAE FRSC is a Lebanese-Canadian electrical engineer specializing in signal processing. She is a professor emerita of electrical and computer engineering at the University of British Columbia.

== Education and career ==
Despite finishing high school with the highest marks in her year in Lebanon, Ward was refused admission to the engineering program at the American University of Beirut because she was a woman. Instead, she began studying medicine at Cairo University to please her father, but quickly switched to engineering there, and graduated with a bachelor's degree in electrical engineering in 1966. She worked briefly for the Ministry of Hydro-Electric Resources in Beirut before coming to the University of California, Berkeley for graduate study in electrical engineering and computer science, where she earned a master's degree in 1969 and completed her PhD in 1972.

She moved to Vancouver following her husband, a civil engineer who had obtained a faculty position at the University of British Columbia while she had been unsuccessful in her own academic job search. Eventually, she found part time work as a lecturer at the University of British Columbia, from 1973 to 1975. In 1975, they both obtained faculty positions at the University of Rhodesia, where she became a lecturer and then senior lecturer, but by 1979 they were pushed to leave by the growing unrest of the Rhodesian Bush War, including the execution of the head of her department. They returned to the University of British Columbia and she returned to her part-time lecturer position. Finally, in 1981, she was appointed as an assistant professor, the first woman to become an engineering professor in British Columbia. She was given tenure as an associate professor in 1985, promoted to full professor in 1993, and retired as professor emerita in 2015. At UBC, she directed the Institute for Computing, Information and Cognitive Systems from 1996 to 2007.

== Recognition ==
Ward became a Fellow of the Engineering Institute of Canada in 1997. She was named a Fellow of the IEEE in 1999, "for contributions to digital signal processing applications in television and medical imaging". She also became a Fellow of the Royal Society of Canada in 1999, and a Fellow of the Canadian Academy of Engineering in 2001. She was elected as an international member of the National Academy of Engineering in 2020, "for innovative applications of signal processing to industrial and bioengineering problems".

In 2007, the IEEE Signal Processing Society gave her their Society Award (later renamed the Norbert Wiener Society Award), "for outstanding technical contributions and leadership in advancing the field of signal and image processing". She was president of the IEEE Signal Processing Society for 2016–2017.
