= Dipankar Raychaudhuri =

Indian electrical engineer

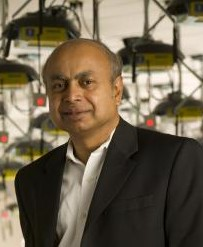
Dipankar Raychaudhuri

Dipankar "Ray" Raychaudhuri (born January 16, 1955) is the current Director of the Wireless Information Network Laboratory (WINLAB) and a distinguished professor in the Department of Electrical and Computer Engineering at Rutgers University.

== Education ==
Raychaudhuri obtained his B.Tech. (Hons) in Electronics & Electrical Communications Engineering from the Indian Institute of Technology, Kharagpur in 1976, and M.S. and Ph.D. degrees from Stony Brook University in 1978 and 1979, respectively. His PhD was on the topic of code division multiple access (CDMA) under the guidance of the late Prof. Stephen Rapapport, who continued to be a mentor and close associate after of Raychaudhuri following his graduation from SUNY StonyBrook.

== Career ==
As a Distinguished Professor in Electrical & Computer Engineering, and Director of the WINLAB at Rutgers University, Raychaudhuri is responsible for an internationally recognized industry-university research center specializing in wireless technology. He is also Principal Investigator for several large National Science Foundation funded projects including the "ORBIT" wireless testbed, the "MobilityFirst" future Internet architecture and the “COSMOS” Platforms for Advanced Wireless Research (PAWR) program.

Dr. Raychaudhuri has previously held corporate R&D positions including: Chief Scientist, Iospan Wireless (2000–01), Assistant General Manager & Department Head, NEC Laboratories (1993–99) and Head, Broadband Communications, Sarnoff Corporation (1990–92). He is a Fellow of the IEEE for contributions in the area of multiple-access packet networks and digital video technology and the recipient of several professional awards including the Rutgers School of Engineering Faculty of the Year Award (2017), IEEE Donald J. Fink Award (2014), Indian Institute of Technology, Kharagpur, Distinguished Alumni Award (2012), and the Schwarzkopf Prize for Technological Innovation (2008).

Prof. Raychaudhuri is also recognized today in the US academic research community as a forward-looking network architect who is leading National Science Foundation supported R&D initiatives focussing on the shape of the future mobile Internet from a "clean slate" perspective (FIA), and the development of open, programmable wireless and network testbeds (ORBIT, GENI and COSMOS). Finally, as director of WINLAB since approximately 2001, he has led development of an internationally acclaimed academic research center specializing in wireless technology.

Dr. Raychaudhuri has also been active in technology entrepreneurship, helping to incubate startup companies in the wireless networking and media areas over the past 18 years. He serves as technical advisor or board member to several new technology companies, and has previously served on the advisory council of the NJ Economic Development Authority's Edison Innovation Fund. He has also served as editor of several journals including IEEE Transactions on Communications, IEEE/ACM Transactions on Networking and IEEE Communications Magazine. He has participated in several international standards committees in the telecom field, and has been an external advisor for several European and Japanese research projects and is currently a member of the international advisory council of the NICT.

== Notable achievements ==
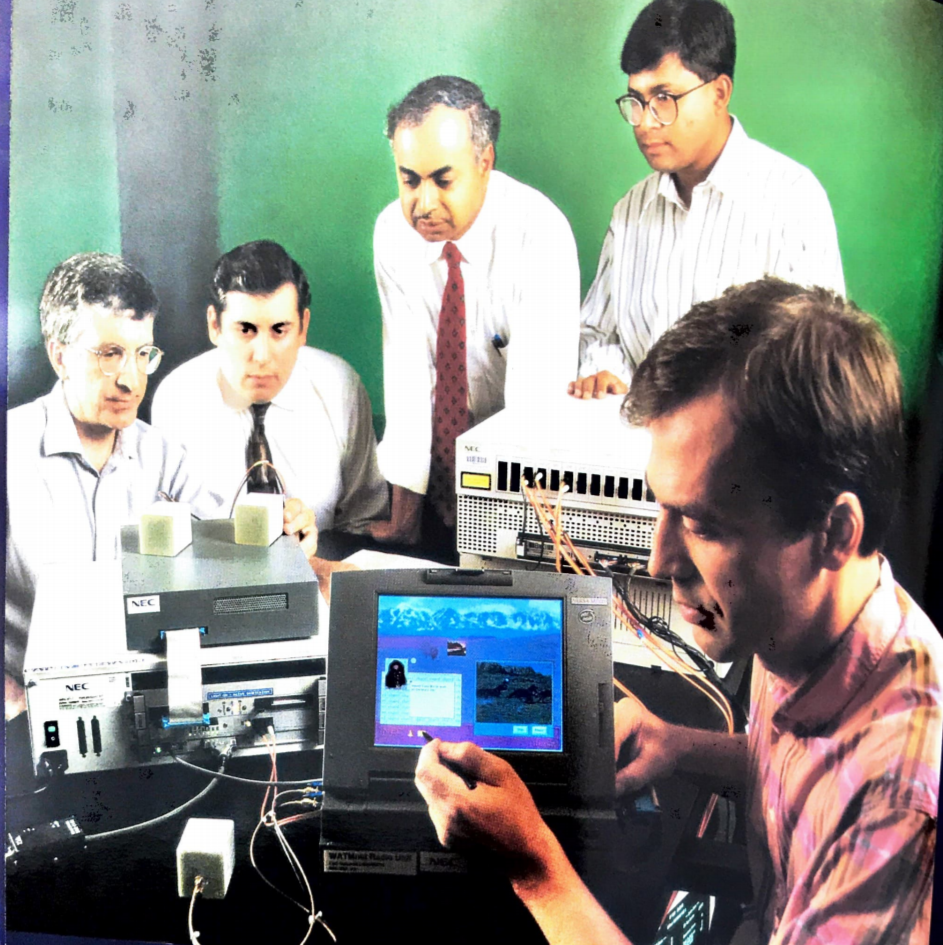
Wireless ATM Prototype Demonstration at the NEC Labs in 1996

Notable technology innovations by Prof. Raychaudhuri include the design and implementation of one of the world's first broadband wireless local area networks. He co-authored his concept for an ATM-based broadband wireless access network in a landmark paper (in IEEE J. Selected Areas in Communications, 1992). Dr. Raychaudhuri's research group at NEC C&C Laboratories in Princeton subsequently demonstrated the feasibility of reliable 25 Mbit/s mobile services in the 5 GHz band and successfully conducted proof-of-concept field trials as early as 1998. Other important research results in his career include the design and prototyping of one of the earliest VSAT (very small aperture terminal) data networks during the 1980s. This technology enabled the first generation of data networks in the US and is still used to provide Internet access to remote areas all over the world. In the early 1990s he was a co-lead for a multi-company research team which designed one of the first HDTV systems tested by the FCC in 1991, significantly influencing the “ATSC” digital TV standard in wide use today. After joining Rutgers as a professor, Dr. Raychaudhuri collaborated with Ivan Seskar (Chief Technologist at WINLAB) to build the "ORBIT radio grid testbed" the world's largest open research testbed for evaluation of future wireless networking protocols. During the period 2010–18, his group at WINLAB has also developed a novel clean-slate mobility-centric future Internet architecture called "MobilityFirst", which proposes a new "named object" approach to Internet routing based on the use of globally unique identifiers (GUIDs) in place of conventional IP addresses. More recently, his research group at WINLAB has been leading a major NSF project funded under the Platforms for Advanced Wireless (PAWR) program aimed at deploying the city-scale, open/programmable COSMOS testbed in New York City for research on next-generation wireless networks with edge cloud capabilities.

== Book ==
“Emerging Wireless Technologies and the Future Mobile Internet”, Cambridge University Press, 2011.

== Awards ==
- ISI "most frequently cited author" in the field of communications during 1985-2005 (2006)
- Fellow of IEEE (1995)
- Schwarzkopf Prize for Technological Innovation (2008)
- IEEE Donald G. Fink Prize Paper Award (2014)
- Faculty of the Year Award at Rutgers School of Engineering (2017)
