= Man Mohan Sondhi =

Man Mohan Sondhi (18 December 1933 – 4 February 2018) was a prominent researcher in speech processing and signal processing who worked at Bell Laboratories during 1962–2001. He was famous for his research on echo cancellation. Born in Firozpur, Punjab, he was educated at Delhi University, Indian Institute of Science, and University of Wisconsin–Madison.

As a specialist in speech science and signal processing, Sondhi recognized that the future of satellite communications would require developing a technology to cancel the 600 millisecond signal echo created by the delay of transmission. Sondhi and his collaborators at Bell Labs eventually created the echo canceller that made practical satellite transmissions possible. He received 5 patents.

In 1998 he received the IEEE Eric E. Sumner award.
