= Donald G. Fink =

American electrical engineer (1911–1996)

Donald Glen Fink (November 8, 1911 – May 3, 1996) was an American electrical engineer, a pioneer in the development of radio navigation systems and television standards, vice president for research of Philco, president of the Institute of Radio Engineers, General Manager of the IEEE, and an editor of many important publications in electrical engineering.

== Biography ==
Fink was born on November 8, 1911, in Englewood, New Jersey. As a high school student, he competed in the National Oratorical Contest on the U.S. constitution, winning first place in Bergen County, New Jersey. He attended the Massachusetts Institute of Technology beginning in 1929 and became editor of the undergraduate technical journal there. He graduated in 1933 with a B.Sc. in electrical communications, and spent a year as a research assistant in the MIT departments of geology and electrical engineering. From 1934 to 1941, he worked as an editor for the magazine Electronics. During World War II, he worked at the MIT Radiation Laboratory and traveled overseas installing LORAN sites. After the war, he became editor-in-chief of Electronics (1946–1952). He joined Philco in 1952, and in 1960 became vice president for research there; in 1962, after the merger of Philco and Ford, he became director of the Philco-Ford Scientific Laboratories.

Fink was long associated with the Institute of Radio Engineers and its successor organization, the IEEE. He was editor-in-chief of Proceedings of the IRE (1956–1957), member of the IRE board of directors (1949–1951 and 1956–1960), president of the IRE (beginning 1958), general manager and later executive director of IEEE (1963–1974) and, after retiring in 1974, "Director Emeritus for life". At the IEEE, he played an important role in guiding the institute through its formative years and in expanding the role of the institute from the technical and scientific study of engineering to an expanded view of engineering that also encompassed its professional and societal aspects. In retirement, he continued to edit two major handbooks published by McGraw-Hill, the Standard Handbook for Electrical Engineers and the Electronics Engineers' Handbook. He chaired the United Nations Economic and Social Council science programs from 1976 to 1981.

== Contributions to television ==
Fink was a pioneer in the development of television; The New York Times writes that his 1940 textbook, Principles of TV Engineering, "became a standard text for people working in television development". He chaired the IRE Television System Committee, and was a member of the NTSC committee in the early 1950s; the 525-line resolution of NTSC television was his proposal. He also wrote two more books on television, Television Engineering and Physics of Television, and edited Television Standards and Practice, Color Television Standards, and the Television Engineering Handbook.

== Awards and honors ==
Fink was honored for his wartime service by the Medal of Freedom (1946) and a President's Certificate of Merit (1948). He became a Fellow of the IRE in 1947 "in recognition of his espousal of high standards of technical publishing and for his wartime contributions in the field of electronic aids to navigation"; he was also elected as a fellow of the American Institute of Electrical Engineers in 1951 and of the National Academy of Engineering in 1969. In 1972, the U.S. Army gave him their Outstanding Civilian Service Medal. He received the IEEE Founders Medal in 1977, and the IEEE Centennial Medal in 1984. The IEEE Donald G. Fink Prize Paper Award was established in his honor in 1979, and is given annually to "the most outstanding survey, review, or tutorial paper published in the IEEE Transactions, Journals, Magazines, or in the Proceedings of the IEEE between 1 January and 31 December of the preceding year".

== Books ==
- The Prediction of Amplitude of Oscillation in Vacuum Tube Oscillating Circuits. Senior thesis, MIT, 1933.
- Neon Signs: Manufacture, Installation, Maintenance (with Samuel C. Miller). McGraw Hill, 1935.
- Engineering Electronics. McGraw Hill, 1938.
- Principles of Television Engineering. McGraw Hill, 1940.
- Microwave Radar. Radiation Laboratory, 1942.
- Radar Engineering. McGraw Hill, 1947. Spanish edition, Nigar, 1949.
- Théorie et applications des tubes électroniques (in French). Dunod, 1948.
- Television Engineering. McGraw Hill, 1952. Japanese edition, Kindai Kagakusha, 1954.
- Color Television: Simplified Theory and Service Techniques. Philco, 1954.
- Television Engineering Handbook. McGraw Hill, 1957.
- The Physics of Television (with David M. Luytens). Anchor, 1960. Translated into Afrikaans, Chinese, Danish, Finnish, French, German, Italian, Polish, Spanish, and Swedish.
- Computers and the Human Mind: An Introduction to Artificial Intelligence. Doubleday Anchor Books, 1966.
- Standard Handbook for Electrical Engineers, 10th ed. (with John M. Carroll). McGraw Hill, 1968. The 11th-15th editions removed Carroll's name and added that of H. Wayne Beaty.
- Electronics Engineers' Handbook (with Alexander A. McKenzie). McGraw Hill, 1975. The 1989 edition removed McKenzie's name and added that of Donald Christiansen.
- Engineers and Electrons: A Century of Electrical Progress (with John D. Ryder). IEEE Press, 1983.
- HDTV: Advanced Television for the 1990s (with K. Blair Benson). McGraw Hill, 1991.
