= Shahid U. H. Qureshi =

Electrical engineer and IEEE Fellow

Shahid Ul Haq Qureshi (born 22 September 1945) was a Pakistani electrical engineer, known for his contributions to modem technology.

== Education and career ==
Qureshi was born on 22 September 1945, in Peshawar, Pakistan. He received his undergraduate degree in 1967 from the University of Engineering and Technology, Lahore, Pakistan. He went on to a masters degree at the University of Alberta, completed in 1970. He then remained in Canada for his PhD, which he completed in electrical engineering at the University of Toronto in 1973. His thesis title was New approaches in adaptive reception of digital signals in the presence of intersymbol interference.

Upon completing his PhD, Qureshi joined Codex Corporation, where he worked on research and development of modems. He rose to the position of Vice-President of Research and Advanced Development at Codex.

== Awards and honours ==
Qureshi was elected an IEEE Fellow in 1987 for his contributions to the "architecture and commercial development of high-speed voice, voice-band modems".

A "Shahid U. H. Qureshi Memorial Scholarship" is given out annually by the Department of Electrical and Computer Engineering at the University of Toronto.
