= Anna Scaglione =

Italian and American electrical engineer

Anna Scaglione is an Italian and American electrical engineer, the Stephen M. Ross/Related Companies Professor of electrical and computer engineering at Cornell Tech and the Cornell University College of Engineering, where she directs Cornell's Urban Tech program. Her research involves statistical and distributed signal processing, gossip protocols, the integration of communications and control theory, and applications including smart grids.

== Education and career ==
Scaglione is originally from Reggio Calabria. She studied electrical engineering at Sapienza University of Rome, and after receiving a laurea (the Italian equivalent of a master's degree) in 1995, her advisor Sergio Barbarossa persuaded her to continue for a Ph.D. in signal processing, which she completed in 1999.

She became a postdoctoral researcher at the University of Minnesota in 2000, originally intending to return to Italy, but changing plans for personal reasons. She became an assistant professor at the University of New Mexico from 2000 to 2001, and then an assistant professor at Cornell University beginning in 2001. At Cornell, she was tenured as an associate professor in 2006. She moved to the University of California, Davis in 2008, where she was promoted to full professor in 2010. She moved again to Arizona State University in 2014, and returned to Cornell in 2021.

She was editor in chief of IEEE Signal Processing Letters in 2012 and 2013.

== Recognition ==
Scaglione was elected as an IEEE Fellow in 2011, "for contributions to filterbank precoding for wireless transmission and signal processing for cooperative sensor networks". She is a 2013 co-recipient of the IEEE Donald G. Fink Prize Paper Award.
