= European Association for Signal Processing =

The European Association for Signal Processing (EURASIP) is an international scientific society for the theory and application of signal processing. It was established on the 1st of September 1978. It hosts the European Signal Processing Conference (EUSIPCO), which has been held annually since 1993 in various European locations. It publishes a series of science journals, as EURASIP Journal on Advances in Signal Processing, that have also an open access policy.

The EURASIP is composed of eight Technical Area Committees:

- ASMSP : Acoustic, Speech and Music Signal Processing
- BForSec : Biometrics, Data Forensics, and Security
- SIG-DML : Signal and Data Analytics for Machine Learning
- SPCN : Signal Processing for Communications and Networking
- SPMuS : Signal Processing for Multisensor Systems
- TMTSP : Theoretical and Methodological Trends in Signal Processing
- VIP : Visual Information Processing
- BISA : Biomedical Image & Signal Analytics

Every year, EURASIP gives the Society Awards in five categories:

- EURASIP Early Career Award,
- EURASIP Meritorious Service Award,
- EURASIP Group Technical Achievement Award,
- EURASIP Technical Achievement Award, and
- EURASIP Athanasios Papoulis Award.
