= K. J. Ray Liu =

Taiwanese engineer

- 劉國瑞
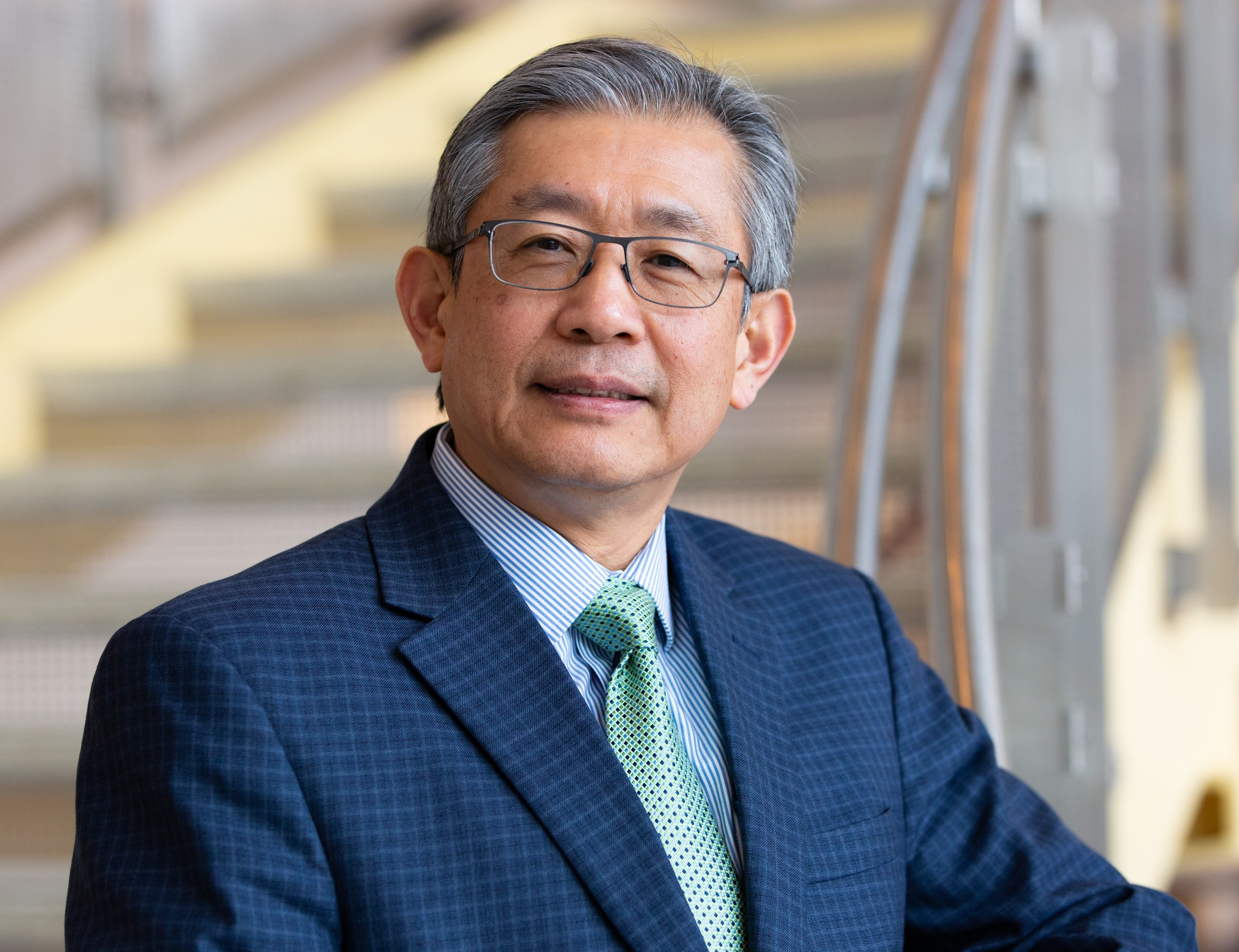
- Liu in 2020
- Born: February 11, 1961 (age 65); Taiwan
- Education: National Taiwan University (BS); University of Michigan (MS); University of California, Los Angeles (PhD)
- Awards: IEEE Fourier Award for Signal Processing; IEEE Leon K. Kirchmayer Graduate Teaching Award; IEEE Haraden Pratt Award
- Scientific career
- Fields: Electrical engineering
- Thesis: Reliable and efficient parallel processing algorithms and architectures for modern signal processing (1990)
- Doctoral advisor: Kung Yao
- Doctoral students: Yan Lindsay Sun, Wade Trappe, Zhen Jane Wang, Zhu Han, Haitao Zheng, Beibei Wang
- Website: https://kjrayliu.org/

Kuo-Juey Ray Liu (Chinese: 劉國瑞; pinyin: Liú Guó Ruì; Pe̍h-ōe-jī: Lâu Kok-sūi; born February 11, 1961 is a Taiwanese-American electrical engineer and entrepreneur. He was the founder, chairman, chief technology officer (CTO), and chief executive officer (CEO) of Origin Wireless, Inc., an artificial intelligence analytics company pioneering wireless sensing and indoor tracking technology, which was acquired by ADT, Inc. in 2026. He was also the founder and president of Odyssey Technology, a company which developed the earliest Internet-based digital surveillance system.

Liu was the Distinguished University Professor at the University of Maryland, College Park, where he retired in 2021. In 2022, he was the president and CEO of the Institute of Electrical and Electronics Engineers (IEEE). His research contributions are in information and communication technology.

== Early life and education ==
Liu grew up in Taichung, Taiwan, where he attended St. Viator Catholic Junior High School. After graduating from Taichung First Senior High School, he studied electrical engineering at National Taiwan University and received a Bachelor of Science (B.S.) in 1983. He then served two years in the Republic of China Armed Forces and earned a master's degree from the University of Michigan in 1987. In 1990, he earned his Ph.D. from the University of California, Los Angeles, under Kung Yao.

== Career ==
Liu joined University of Maryland, College Park, in 1990, where he was a Distinguished University Professor and a Distinguished Scholar-Teacher and also Christine Kim Eminent Professor of Information Technology at Electrical and Computer Engineering Department of A. James Clark School of Engineering. He has trained over 76 Ph.D. and postdoctoral students, of which 13 are now IEEE fellows. According to the Mathematics Genealogy Project, he has had over 200 Ph.D. descendants. He retired from the University of Maryland at the end of 2021.

Liu founded Origin Wireless in 2013, and pioneered ambient sensing and intelligence by leveraging the ubiquitous radio waves around us as the new sixth sense to decipher human activities, secure home, provide better health care, automate intelligent space, without using any proprietary devices or wearables. Origin was acquired by ADT, Inc. in February 2026. Original Wireless products won three CES Innovation Awards, including CES Best of Innovation in 2021, 2017 CEATEC Grand Prix, and the 2021 Red Dot Design Award.

Liu was the 2022 IEEE President and CEO. He has served as the 2019 IEEE Vice President - Technical Activities, Division IX Director of IEEE Board of Directors in 2016–17, and the President of IEEE Signal Processing Society in 2012–13. He was also the Editor-in-Chief of IEEE Signal Processing Magazine in 2003-05. Liu was a founder of Asia-Pacific Association of Signal and Information Processing (APSIPA).

As the founder and president of Odyssey Technology in 1997–1999, Liu and his team developed "Remoteeyes", the world's first digital surveillance system through the Internet when the only available surveillance systems were analog.

== Awards and honors ==
Liu is the recipient of two IEEE Technical Field Awards: the 2021 IEEE Fourier Award for Signal Processing with the citation "For outstanding leadership in and pioneering contributions to signal processing for wireless sensing and communications", and the 2016 IEEE Leon K. Kirchmayer Graduate Teaching Award "for exemplary teaching and curriculum development, inspirational mentoring of graduate students, and broad educational impact in signal processing and communications".

Liu received the 2026 IEEE-HKN Asad M. Madni Technical Achievement and Excellence Award "for pioneering technical contributions, entrepreneurial innovations, and profound leadership impact." and the 2026 IEEE Haraden Pratt Award "for transformative and impactful leadership." Recognized by Web of Science as a Highly Cited Researcher (2001–2014, 2016–17), Liu is a member of National Academy of Engineering for contributions to signal processing for wireless sensing and communications, and a fellow of the IEEE, for contributions to algorithms, architectures, and implementations for signal processing. Liu is also a fellow of the American Association for the Advancement of Science, and National Academy of Inventors. He was honored as 2021 Distinguished Alumni of National Taiwan University. His research was featured as one of seven technologies that IEEE believes will have the world changing implications on the way humans interact with machines, the world and each other, in honor of IEEE's 125th Anniversary.

He is also the recipient of numerous honors and awards including, IEEE Signal Processing Society 2014 Norbert Wiener Lifetime Achievement Award for "influential technical contributions and profound leadership impact"; IEEE Signal Processing Society 2009 Claude Shannon-Harry Nyquist Technical Achievement Award "for pioneering and outstanding contributions for the advances of signal processing in multimedia forensics, security, and wireless communications"; APSIPA 2018 Grand Award; 1994 National Science Foundation Young Investigator Award; IEEE Signal Processing Society Distinguished Lecturer; IEEE Signal Processing Society Meritorious Service Award; EURASIP Meritorious Service Award, and over a dozen of best paper/invention awards. He was inducted into the IEEE Technical Activities Board Hall of Honors in 2021 "for starting the financial transparency movement, initializing and realizing of IEEE DataPort and IEEE App".

He also received various research and teaching recognitions from the University of Maryland, including Poole and Kent Senior Faculty Teaching Award (2005), Outstanding Faculty Research Award (2008), and Outstanding Service Award (2012), all from A. James Clark School of Engineering; Invention of the Year Award (three times) from the University's Office of Technology Commercialization, as well as the George Corcoran Award for outstanding contributions to electrical engineering education from the Electrical and Computer Engineering Department, and the Outstanding Systems Engineering Faculty Award in recognition of outstanding contributions in interdisciplinary research from Institute for Systems Research.

== Contributions and Impact ==
Liu's research contributions encompass broad aspects of signal processing and communications, including wireless communications; coding; networking; game theory; multimedia signal processing; information forensics; network security; and signal processing algorithms and architectures. In the past decade, he was credited for pioneering and commercializing ambient sensing and intelligence by leveraging the ambient radio signals ubiquitously surrounding us to decipher human activities.

Liu was credited for his reinterpretation of multipath interference and usage of niche time-reversal physics in applications with great potential to impact daily life. While the scientific community spent decades viewing signal bouncing as "noise," Liu proved that in chaotic indoor environments, this complexity is actually a source of precision. Liu was the first to propose time-reversal division multiple access (TRDMA) in 2011 as a new wireless multiple access scheme for 5G/6G and beyond for broadband communications. It was earlier than technology readiness for such a dramatic paradigm shift, but now time-reversal is a promising technology being considered for 6G wireless communications.

Using the time-reversal principle, he also developed the world's first centimeter-accuracy indoor positioning and tracking system in 2015 with only a single transmitter and terminal device, both with a single antenna, in a completely non-line-of-sight environment. It represented the first non-line-of-sight, non-triangulation technique for accurate position estimation, solving a long-standing conundrum of indoor positioning/tracking for over many decades.

He further showed that in multipath-rich environments (such as indoor environments), the time-reversal focusing spot exhibits a stationary behavior in its energy distribution. This discovery enabled precise speed estimation in complex indoor settings, a task previously considered insurmountable. By establishing a principle that succeeds where the Doppler Effect fails, his work enabled accurate tracking of an unlimited number of subjects, indoors, and without costly infrastructure or a priori measurements, it also served as the theoretical foundation for accurate/reliable wireless sensing by simply using ambient radio waves, including Wi-Fi.

With that, Liu and his team at Origin developed an AI platform including many analytic engines with applications such as indoor tracking; gait determination; motion detection for security; sleep monitoring; monitoring small motions inside a car; material sensing; monitoring heart rate and breathing; heart rate variability detection; fall detection; recognizing and counting people in hidden spaces; millimeter-wave imaging; millimeter-wave real-time handwriting tracking and analysis; millimeter-wave keyboard tracking; and sound detection.

He was the first who proposed in 2019 the establishment of an international standard on wireless sensing to the Chair of the IEEE 802 Standard Committee, who facilitated the creation of 802.11bf WLAN Sensing as the world's first wireless sensing standard.

In 1997-1999, Liu and his team in Odyssey Technology developed "Remoteeyes", which was the world's first digital video surveillance system to monitor and secure home/office through the Internet remotely. By revolutionizing the industry from analog to networked digital video, he essentially sparked a $100 billion industry that remains a cornerstone of modern security.

Liu pioneered cross-layer design using antenna arrays for wireless communications in 1997 by first introducing the concept of duality between uplink and downlink for joint transmit beamforming and power control to increase the number of users in a cellular network by a factor of 100.

When the narrowband space–time codes were exciting the research community, there have been many attempts in the research community to search for the broadband full-diversity space-frequency code or even the full-diversity space-time-frequency code. Liu's group showed for the first time in 2003 that the maximum achievable diversity order with arbitrary channel power delay profile is a product of the number of delay paths, the rank of the channel temporal correlation, and the number of transmit and receive antennas. With that his group developed the world's first full-diversity, full-rate space-frequency code and the only available systematic space-time-frequency code that achieves the maximum achievable diversity in space, time, and frequency for broadband wireless communications by exploiting all of the available spatial, temporal and frequency diversities in broadband wireless systems. This work provides a first step toward achieving full-diversity in multiple-input multiple-output (MIMO) broadband OFDM systems that are commonly used in modern wireless communications standards such as 4G/WiFi and beyond.

He made significant contributions to cooperative communications and networking by holistically addressing performance, coverage, energy efficiency, and throughput.

Liu was among the first to employ game theory to devise optimal solutions and strategies in cognitive radio for dynamic spectrum access, allocation, sharing, sensing, security, and anti-jamming. His pioneering works created the game-theoretic foundation for cognitive networking by developing new framework of joint learning and decision making such as Chinese Restaurant Games.

Liu published early research in multimedia forensics and security. His 2005 book, Multimedia Fingerprinting Forensics for Traitor Tracing laid the foundation of this emerging field, in which he contributed new concepts, such as anti-collusion codes, behavior forensics, and anti-forensics. He coined the name "information forensics" when proposing the journal IEEE Transactions on Information Forensics and Security.

Liu was the prime architect and proposer of IEEE Transactions on Information Forensics and Security, IEEE Journal on Selected Topics of Signal Processing, and IEEE Transactions on Multimedia. He also initiated the creation of IEEE Transactions on Computational Imaging and IEEE Transactions on Signal and Information Processing over Networks. As Vice President – Publications, he started the Inside Signal Processing eNewsletter for IEEE Signal Processing Society.

Liu created IEEE DataPort, a data-sharing platform integrated with IEEE journals and co-led the development of the IEEE App.

== Publications and Patents ==
Liu has published over 900 refereed papers, 250 patents, and 12 books, including the following:

- "本心：科学与人生", 中信出版集团, China, 2025
- "本心：问学人生", 秀威咨讯（天钰基金会）, Taiwan, 2025
- "Reciprocity, Evolution, and Decision Games in Network and Data Science", Cambridge University Press, 2021
- "Wireless AI: Wireless Sensing, Positioning, IoT, and Communications", Cambridge University Press, 2019
- "Behavior Dynamics in Media-Sharing Social Networks", Cambridge University Press, 2011
- "Cognitive Radio Networking and Security – A Game Theoretic View", Cambridge University Press, 2010
- "Cooperative Communications and Networking", Cambridge University Press, 2009
- "Resource Allocation for Wireless Networks: Basics, Techniques, and Applications", Cambridge University Press, 2008
- "Ultra-Wideband Communication Systems: The Multiband OFDM Approach", Wiley, 2007
- "Network-Aware Security for Group Communications", Springer, 2007
- "Multimedia Fingerprinting Forensics for Traitor Tracing", Hindawi, 2005
- "Design of Digital Video Coding Systems: A Complete Compressed Domain Approach", Marcel Dekker, 2001
- "Handbook on Array Processing and Sensor Networks", Ed., IEEE-Wiley, 2009
