= Jane Wang =

Jane Wang may refer to:

- Jane Wang (composer and musician)
- Jane-Ling Wang, Chinese-American statistician
- Q. Jane Wang, Chinese-American tribologist
- Sue-Jane Wang, American biostatistician
- Z. Jane Wang, Chinese-American researcher on insect flight
- Zhen Jane Wang, Chinese-Canadian signal processing researcher
