= Moulines =

Moulines is the name or part of the name of several communes in France:

- Moulines, Calvados in the Calvados department
- Moulines, Manche in the Manche department

== Names ==
- Éric Moulines, French researcher

== See also ==
- Moulins (disambiguation)
