= Jiebo Luo =

Chinese-American computer scientist

- Born: 1967 (age 58–59); Yunnan, China
- Education: University of Rochester (PhD, 1996); University of Science and Technology of China (MS, 1992; BS, 1989)
- Awards: IEEE Computer Society Edward J. McCluskey Technical Achievement Award (2025); ACM SIGMM Technical Achievement Award (2021)
- Scientific career
- Fields: Computer vision Machine learning Data science
- Workplaces: University of Rochester; Kodak Research Laboratories
- Website: www.cs.rochester.edu/u/jluo/

Jiebo Luo (Chinese: 罗杰波; born 1967) is a Chinese-American computer scientist and the Albert Arendt Hopeman Professor of Engineering and professor of computer science at the University of Rochester. His research covers computer vision, machine learning, and the analysis of multimedia and social media data.

He received the IEEE Computer Society's Edward J. McCluskey Technical Achievement Award in 2025 and the ACM SIGMM Technical Achievement Award in 2021.

He is a fellow of AIMBE, NAI, AAAI, ACM, IAPR, IEEE, and SPIE, and a member of Academia Europaea.

== Career and education ==
Luo joined the University of Rochester's Department of Computer Science in fall 2011. Previously, he spent more than fifteen years at Kodak Research Laboratories, where he conducted and directed research and advanced development, last holding the position of senior principal scientist. He was also named a Kodak Distinguished Inventor.

He received a PhD in electrical engineering from the University of Rochester in 1996. He earned his master's degree in 1992 and bachelor's degree in 1989 from the University of Science and Technology of China, both in electrical engineering.

== Research ==
Luo's research spans signal processing, image processing, computer vision, natural language processing, machine learning, data mining, and multimedia. His work also includes multimodal learning, social media analysis, computational social science, and digital health, including medical image computing.

According to his university biography, he has published more than 700 peer-reviewed technical papers and holds at least 98 U.S. patents. As of September 10, 2026, Google Scholar recorded 76,126 citations to his publications, an h-index of 138, and an i10-index of 600.

In 2021, Luo was a principal investigator, alongside Jin Xiao and Kevin Fiscella, on a project to develop AICaries, a smartphone application designed to use artificial intelligence to detect tooth decay in children from photographs.

In 2023, he continued this work as a principal investigator on SMARTeeth (Smart Connected Oral Health Community), a three-year project funded by the National Science Foundation's Smart and Connected Communities program. The project aimed to combine the app with community outreach through oral-health centers, mobile vans, and community health workers to improve access to screening and dental care in underserved communities.

Also in 2023, Luo led a study that used machine learning to examine media bias in 1.8 million headlines published by nine U.S. news outlets between 2014 and 2022.

== Professional service ==
=== Conferences and workshops ===
Luo's conference leadership roles include:

- 2024: General co-chair, IEEE International Conference on Multimedia and Expo (ICME).
- 2023: General co-chair, ACM International Conference on Multimedia Retrieval (ICMR).
- 2018: General co-chair, ACM Multimedia.
- 2017: Program co-chair, IEEE International Conference on Image Processing (ICIP).
- 2016: Program co-chair, ACM International Conference on Multimedia Retrieval (ICMR).
- 2012: Program co-chair, IEEE Conference on Computer Vision and Pattern Recognition (CVPR).
- 2010: Program co-chair, ACM Multimedia.
- 2008: General co-chair, ACM International Conference on Content-based Image and Video Retrieval (CIVR).
- 2007: Co-chair, SPIE Visual Communication and Image Processing (VCIP).

He was the founding chair of the ACM SIGMM Workshop on Social Media (2009–2011) and the CVPR Workshop on Semantic Learning Applications in Multimedia (2006–2009). He has also served on IEEE technical committees and on the steering committees for ACM CIVR/ICMR and IEEE ICME. In 2001, he chaired the Rochester chapter of the IEEE Signal Processing Society.

=== Editorial work ===
Luo is a deputy editor of BME Frontiers. He was editor-in-chief of IEEE Transactions on Multimedia from 2020 to 2022.

He has served on the editorial boards of Health Data Science and Intelligent Medicine, as well as ACM Transactions on Intelligent Systems and Technology, IEEE Transactions on Big Data, IEEE Transactions on Pattern Analysis and Machine Intelligence, IEEE Transactions on Multimedia, IEEE Transactions on Circuits and Systems for Video Technology, Pattern Recognition, and Machine Vision and Applications.

His guest-edited special issues have addressed learning with fewer labels in computer vision, video analytics with deep learning, and deep learning for multimedia computing.

== Awards and honors ==
=== Paper awards and distinctions ===
Papers coauthored by Luo have received the following awards and distinctions:

Paper awards and distinctions, by year of recognition
Year	Recognition	Conference or journal	Paper
2026	Best Paper Finalist	IEEE/CVF Conference on Computer Vision and Pattern Recognition (CVPR)	"PixelDiT: Pixel Diffusion Transformers for Image Generation"
2023	Best Student Paper Award	IEEE International Conference on Digital Health (ICDH)	"sDREAMER: Self-distilled Mixture-of-Modality-Experts Transformer for Automatic Sleep Staging"
2021	Best Long Paper Award	North American Chapter of the Association for Computational Linguistics (NAACL)	"Video-aided Unsupervised Grammar Induction"
2018	Best Industrial Related Paper Award	International Conference on Pattern Recognition (ICPR)	"End-to-end Multi-Modal Multi-Task Vehicle Control for Self-Driving Cars with Visual Perception"
2015	Best Paper Award	ACM International Conference on Internet Multimedia Computing and Service (ICIMCS)	"Using User Generated Online Photos to Estimate and Monitor Air Pollution in Major Cities"
2014	IEEE Multimedia Prize Paper Award	IEEE Transactions on Multimedia (TMM)	"Tag-Based Image Retrieval Improved by Augmented Features and Group-Based Refinement"
2010	Best Student Paper Award	IEEE Conference on Computer Vision and Pattern Recognition (CVPR)	"Visual Event Recognition in Videos by Learning from Web Data"
2008	Best Poster Paper Award	ACM International Conference on Content-based Image and Video Retrieval (CIVR)	"Leveraging Probabilistic Season and Location Context Models for Scene Understanding"
1994	Best Student Paper Award	SPIE Visual Communication and Image Processing (VCIP)	"On the applications of Gibbs random field in image processing: from segmentation to enhancement"

=== Individual honors ===
- 2025. IEEE Computer Society Edward J. McCluskey Technical Achievement Award
- 2025. AIMBE Fellow
- 2024. Debra Haring Excellence in Research Award, University of Rochester
- 2024. Edmund A. Hajim Outstanding Faculty Award, University of Rochester
- 2024. William H. Riker University Award for Excellence in Graduate Teaching, University of Rochester
- 2022. NAI Fellow
- 2022. Member of Academia Europaea
- 2021. ACM SIGMM Technical Achievement Award
- 2019. AAAI Fellow
- 2018. ACM Fellow
- 2018. IEEE Region 1 Technological Innovation (Academic) Award
- 2010. IAPR Fellow
- 2009. IEEE Fellow
- 2008. SPIE Fellow
- 2004. George Eastman Innovation Award, Kodak

== Selected books ==
- 2022. Liao, Haofu; Zhou, S. Kevin; Luo, Jiebo (2022). Deep Network Design for Medical Image Computing: Principles and Applications. Academic Press. ISBN 978-0-12-824383-1.
- 2011. Batra, Dhruv; Kowdle, Adarsh; Parikh, Devi; Luo, Jiebo; Chen, Tsuhan (2011). Interactive Co-segmentation of Objects in Image Collections. SpringerBriefs in Computer Science. New York: Springer. doi:10.1007/978-1-4614-1915-0. ISBN 978-1-4614-1914-3.
- 2011. Hoi, Steven C. H.; Luo, Jiebo; Boll, Susanne; Xu, Dong; Jin, Rong; King, Irwin, eds. (2011). Social Media Modeling and Computing. London: Springer. doi:10.1007/978-0-85729-436-4. ISBN 978-0-85729-435-7.
- 2011. Computer Vision. University of Science and Technology of China Press. 2011. ISBN 978-7-312-02750-5.
- 2010. Shao, Ling; Shan, Caifeng; Luo, Jiebo; Etoh, Minoru, eds. (2010). Multimedia Interaction and Intelligent User Interfaces: Principles, Methods and Applications. Advances in Computer Vision and Pattern Recognition. London: Springer. doi:10.1007/978-1-84996-507-1. ISBN 978-1-84996-506-4.
