= International Conference on Acoustics, Speech, and Signal Processing =

Conference in signal processing

- Abbreviation: ICASSP
- Discipline: signal processing, machine learning, audio signal processing, speech processing

Publication details
- Publisher: IEEE
- History: 1976–present
- Frequency: Annual
- Website: 2024.ieeeicassp.org (ICASSP 2024)

ICASSP, the International Conference on Acoustics, Speech, and Signal Processing, is an annual flagship conference organized by IEEE Signal Processing Society. Ei Compendex has indexed all papers included in its proceedings.

The first ICASSP was held in 1976 in Philadelphia, Pennsylvania, based on the success of a conference in Massachusetts four years earlier that had focused specifically on speech signals.

As ranked by Google Scholar's h-index metric in 2016, ICASSP has the highest h-index of any conference in the Signal Processing field. The Brazilian ministry of education gave the conference an 'A1' rating based on its h-index.

== Conference list ==
Year	Dates	Location	Conference Chairs	Attendance	Accepted Papers
1976	12-14 April	Philadelphia, PA, USA	General Chair: Charles F. Teacher Technical Program Chair: Thomas B. Martin	~600	225
1977	8-11 May	Hartford, CT, USA	General Chair: Harvey Silverman Technical Program Chair: N. Rex Dixon	~640	220
1978	10-12 April	Tulsa, OK, USA	General Chair: Rao Yarlagadda Technical Program Chair: Thomas H. Crystal	641	210
1979	2-4 April	Washington, DC, USA	General Chair: Anthony I. Eller Technical Program Chair: G. Robert Redinbo	900	242
1980	9-11 April	Denver, CO, USA	General Chair: J. Robert Ashley Technical Program Chair: Louis L. Scharf	970	257
1981	30 March-1 April	Atlanta, GA, USA	General Chair: Ronald W. Schafer Technical Program Chair: Russell M. Mersereau	950	295
1982	3-5 May	Paris, France	General Chair: Claude Gueguen Technical Program Chair: Maurice Bellanger	1653	522
1983	14-16 April	Boston, MA, USA	General Chair: Peter E. Blankenship Technical Program Chair: John Makhoul	1300	372
1984	19-21 March	San Diego, CA, USA	General Chair: Stanley A. White Technical Program Chair: Y.T. Chan	1520	537
1985	26-29 March	Tampa, FL, USA	General Chair: N. Rex Dixon Technical Program Chair: Vijay Jain	1400	472
1986	8-11 April	Tokyo, Japan	General Chair: Hiroya Fujisaki Technical Program Chair: Shuzo Saito and Jae S. Lim	1350	785
1987	6-9 April	Dallas, TX, USA	General Chair: Panos E. Papamichalis Technical Program Chair: Masud M. Arjmand	1400	615
1988	11-14 April	New York, NY, USA	General Chair: Jont B. Allen Technical Program Chair: John G. Ackenhusen	1899	718
1989	23-26 May	Glasgow, Scotland	General Chair: Tariq Durrani Technical Program Chair: Peter Grant and Roy Chapman	1617	711
1990	3-6 April	Albuquerque, NM, USA	General Chair: Delores M. Etter Technical Program Chair: Nasir Ahmed	1700	725
1991	14-17 May	Toronto, ON, Canada	General Chair: Y.T. Chan Technical Program Chair. AN. Venetsanopoulos	1949	933
1992	23-26 March	San Francisco, CA, USA	General Chair: Marcia Bush Technical Program Chair: Michael Portnoff and Gary Kopec	1998	806
1993	27-30 April	Minneapolis, MN, USA	General Chair: Mos Kaveh Technical Program Chair: Jan Allebach and Kevin Buckley	2000	814
1994	18-22 April	Adelaide, Australia	General Chair: Robert E. Bogner Technical Program Chair: Boualem Boashash	1331	844
1995	9-12 May	Detroit, MI, USA	General Chair: Alfred Hero Technical Program Chair: William J. Williams and Andrew Yagle	1941	917
1996	7-10 May	Atlanta, GA, USA	General Chair: Monson Hayes Technical Program Chair: Mark A Clements	1900	905
1997	21-24 April	Munich, Germany	General Chair: Manfred Lang Technical Program Chair: Josef A. Nossek	1800	1050
1998	12-15 May	Seattle, WA, USA	General Chair: Les Atlas Technical Program Chair: Hynek Hermansky and Jenq-Neng Hwang	2100	965
1999	15-19 March	Phoenix, AZ, USA	General Chair: Andreas Spanias and Douglas Cochran Technical Program Chair: W. Bastiaan Kleijn and Joseph Picone	2005	911
2000	5-9 June	Istanbul, Turkey	General Chair: Huseyin Abut and Levent Onural Technical Program Chair: A. Murat Tekalp and Biilent Sankur	1453	989
2001	7-11 May	Salt Lake City, UT, USA	General Chair: V. John Mathews Technical Program Chair: A. Lee Swindlehurst	2023	1017
2002	13-17 May	Orlando, FL, USA	General Chair: Fred 1. Taylor Technical Program Chair: Jose Principe	1621	1164
2003	6-10 April	Hong Kong (canceled)	General Chair: Wan-Chi Siu, A. G. Constantinides, and Yiu-tong Chan Technical Program Chair: P. C. Ching	Canceled	1274
2004	17-21 May	Montreal, QC, Canada	General Chair: Douglas O’Shaughnessy Technical Program Chair: Li Deng and Peter Kabal	2211	1399
2005	19-23 March	Philadelphia, PA, USA	General Chair: Athina Petropulu Technical Program Chair: K. Barner and J.-C. Pesquet	966	1479
2006	14-19 May	Toulouse, France	General Chair: Francis Castanie Technical Program Chair: P. Duhamel and L. Vandendorpe	2169	1572
2007	16-20 April	Honolulu, HI, USA	General Chair: K.J. Ray Liu and Todd Reed Technical Program Chair: Anthony Kuh and Yi-Fang Huang	1773	1390
2008	31 March-4 April	Las Vegas, NV, USA	General Chair: Ali H. Sayed Technical Program Chair: Björn Ottersten	2467	1362
2009	19-24 April	Taipei, Taiwan	General Chair: Lin-shan, Lee and Iee-Ray Wei Technical Program Chair: Liang-Gee Chen and James R. Glass	1689	1689
2010	14-19 March	Dallas, TX, USA	General Chair: Scott Douglas Technical Program Chair: John Hansen	1905	1386
2011	22-27 May	Prague, Czech Republic	General Chair: Petr Tichavsky Technical Program Chair: Jonathon Chambers	2066	1505
2012	25-30 March	Kyoto, Japan	General Chair: Hideaki Sakai and Takao Nishitani Technical Program Chair: Akihiko Sugiyama and Hitoshi Kiya	2024	1357
2013	26-31 May	Vancouver, BC, Canada	General Chair: Li Deng and Rabab Ward Technical Program Chair: Vikram Krishnamurthy	2431	1793
2014	25-30 May	Florence, Italy	General Chair: Fulvio Gini Technical Program Chair: Abdelhak Zoubir	2406	1692
2015	19-24 April	Brisbane, Australia	General Chair: Vaughan Clarkson and Jonathan Manton Technical Program Chair: Doug Gray and Doug Cochran	1731	1209
2016	20-25 March	Shanghai, China	General Chair: Wenjun Zhang, Zhi Ding, and Zhi-Quan Luo Technical Program Chair: Xiaodong Wang	2093	1333
2017	5-9 March	New Orleans, LA, USA	General Chair: Magdy Bayoumi Technical Program Chair: Tulay Adali and Eli Saber	2239	1331
2018	15-20 April	Calgary, AB, Canada	General Chair: Monson Hayes and Hanseok Ko Technical Program Chair: Pascale Fung and Nam Ik Cho	2269	1404
2019	12-17 May	Brighton, UK	General Chair: Lajos Hanzo and Saeid Sanei Technical Program Chair: Nam Ik Cho, Petar M Djuric, and Andrzej Cichocki	3060	1743
2020	4-8 May	Virtual	General Chair: Ana Perez-Neira and Xavier Mestre Technical Program Chair: Markus Rupp, Christian Jutten, and Pascale Fung	16087	1871
2021	6-11 June	Virtual	General Chair: Dimitrios Androutsos, Kostas Plataniotis, and Xiao-Ping Zhang Technical Program Chair: Tim Davidson and Dong Yu	2184	1732
2022	22-27 May	Singapore, Singapore	General Chair: Haizhou Li Technical Program Chair: Woon-Seng Gan	2510	1874
2023	4-10 June	Rhodes Island, Greece	General Chair: Kostas Berberidis, Petros Boufounos, and Petros Maragos Technical Program Chair: Constantine Kotropoulos and Shrikanth Narayanan	4086	2726
2024	14-19 April	Seoul, Korea	General Chair: Hanseok Ko and Monson Hayes Technical Program Chair: John Hansen	4403	2712
2025	06-11 April	Hyderabad, India	General Chair: K.V.S. Hari and V John Mathews Technical Program Chair: Bhaskar D. Rao, Isabel Trancoso, Gaurav Sharma, and Neelesh B. Mehta	~4000	3393
