= Trappe =

Trappe may refer to:

== People ==
- James Trappe, an American mycologist
- Wade Trappe, American engineer

== Places ==
=== France ===
- La Trappe Abbey, house of origin of the Trappists
- Soligny-la-Trappe, location of La Trappe Abbey

=== United States ===
- Trappe, Maryland, a town in Talbot County
- Trappe, Pennsylvania, a borough in Montgomery County
