= Journal of Multimedia =

- Discipline: Computer science
- Language: English
- Edited by: Jiebo Luo

Publication details
- History: 2006 to 2015
- Publisher: Academy Publisher (Finland)
- Frequency: Monthly

Standard abbreviations
- ISO 4: J. Multimed.

Indexing
- ISSN: 1796-2048

Links
- Journal homepage

The Journal of Multimedia was a monthly peer-reviewed scientific journal published by Academy Publisher. It covered the study of multimedia algorithms and applications, information retrieval, artificial intelligence, multimedia compression, statistical inference, network theory, and other related topics. The editor-in-chief from 2009 to 2015 was Jiebo Luo (University of Rochester).

== Indexing and abstracting ==
The journal was abstracted and indexed in EBSCO databases, Scopus, EI Compendex, INSPEC, PASCAL, and ProQuest.
