= Yan Sun =

Yan Sun or Sun Yan may refer to:

- Sun Yan (Confucian scholar), Three Kingdoms Confucian scholar, first to use fanqie
- Sun Yan (volleyball) (born 2001), Chinese volleyball player
- Yan Lindsay Sun, Chinese-American power engineer
