= Wanda Austin =

American CEO

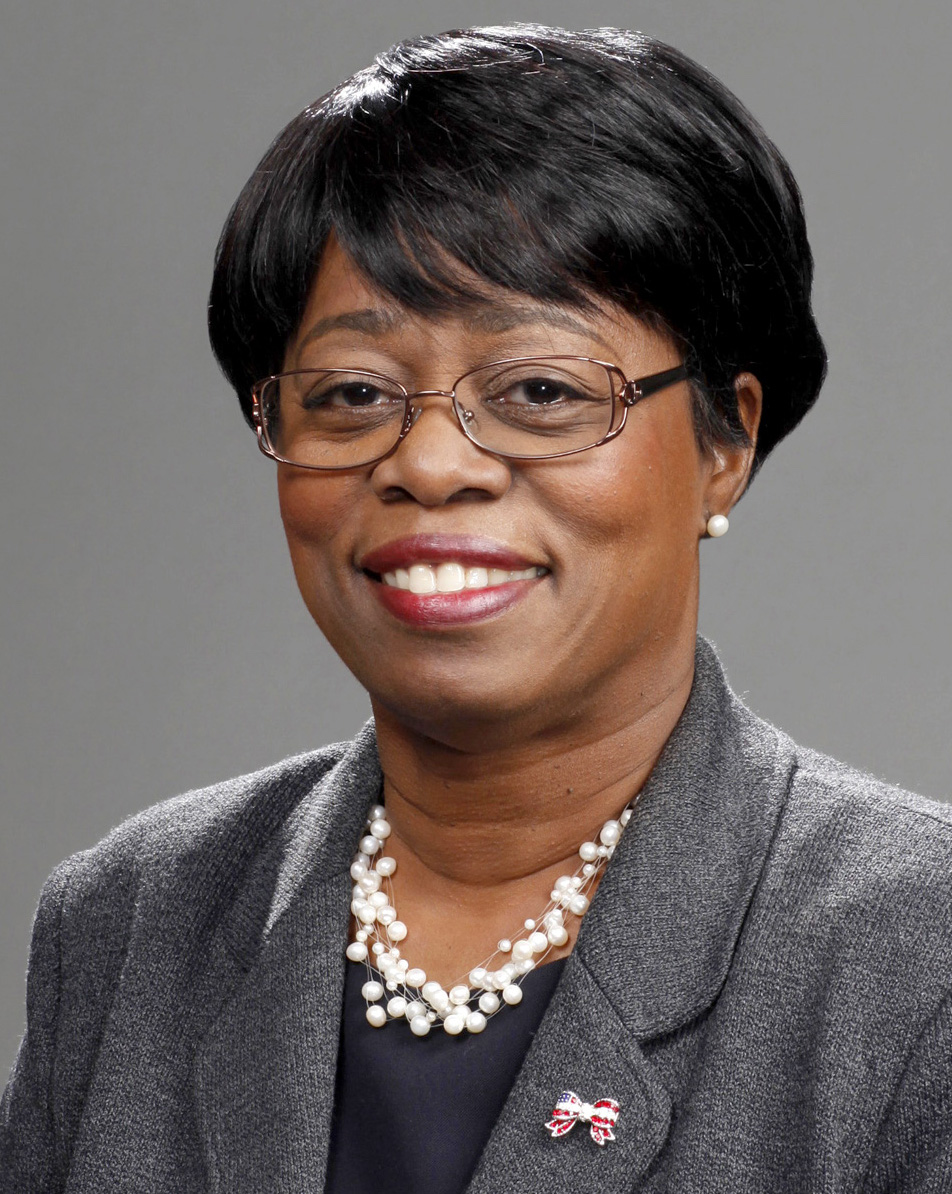
- Born: September 8, 1954; New York City, U.S.
- Education: Bronx High School of Science 1971; Franklin and Marshall College (BS in mathematics in 1975); University of Pittsburgh (MS in systems engineering and mathematics in 1977); University of Southern California (PhD in systems engineering in 1988)
- Parents: Helen Pompey; Murry Pompey
- Engineering career
- Discipline: Aerospace
- Institutions: American Academy of Arts and Sciences; National Academy of Engineering; American Institute of Aeronautics and Astronautics; NASA Advisory Council; Review of United States Human Space Flight Plans Committee; Defense Science Board

Wanda M. Austin (born 1954) is an American aerospace engineer. She is a former president and CEO of the Aerospace Corporation. She was both the first woman, and the first African-American, to hold this position. Austin also served as interim president for the University of Southern California, following the resignation of C. L. Max Nikias. She was both the first woman, and the first African-American, to hold this position.

Austin has served on numerous White House commissioned boards and committees and received recognition for her contributions to engineering, aeronautics, and science, technology, engineering, and mathematics (STEM) education.

== Early life and education ==
Austin was born in the Bronx, New York City, in "the Projects". Her "good fortune" was in having parents, and particularly an educationally ambitious mother, who Austin credits for putting her young daughter on buses and sending her across the city to gain access to better schools in more stable neighborhoods.

She graduated from the Bronx High School of Science in 1971. She earned a bachelor's degree in mathematics from Franklin & Marshall College, arriving on the "beautiful rural campus" as one of twenty African American students out of a student body of near 2000. A junior year abroad at the University of Lancaster further broadened "inner city kid" Austin's exposure to academic possibilities, with senior tutor George Rosenstein instrumental in her application to the University of Pittsburgh. where Austin earned two master's degrees: one in Systems Engineering and one in Applied Mathematics (1977)

After a hiatus of several years working in industry, in 1988 Austin returned to academia to earn her doctorate (PhD) from the University of Southern California (USC), a flexible program that allowed her to continue working concurrent with her studies. Her dissertation, under Khosh Nevis, was on system dynamics and artificial intelligence, Understanding Natural Language in the Application of System Dynamics Modeling.

== Career ==
After completing her master's degree in 1977, Austin accepted a position at Rockwell International in California, working with missile systems as technical staff. Austin joined the Aerospace Corporation in 1979, where she served in numerous senior management and executive positions including senior vice president of the corporation's Engineering and Technology Group. Austin explains her work in the MILSAC (Military Satellite Communications) Program at Aerospace Corporation. From 2004 to 2007, she was Senior Vice President of the National Systems Group at Aerospace, prior to assuming the role of CEO on January 1, 2008. She served as CEO for almost nine years and retired on October 1, 2016.

In 2009, Austin served as a member of the U.S. Human Space Flight Plans Committee. The following year, she was appointed to the US Defense Science Board and in 2014 she became a member of the NASA Advisory Council, both of which were White House commissioned. In 2015, Austin was selected by President Barack Obama to serve on the President’s Council of Advisors on Science and Technology. PCAST is an advisory group of the nation’s leading scientists and engineers who directly advise the President and the Executive Office of the President.

In December 2017, Austin co-founded MakingSpace, Inc., a leadership and STEM (science, technology, engineering, and math) consulting firm, and continues to serve as the CEO.

On August 7, 2018, Austin was named the interim president of the University of Southern California after C. L. Max Nikias's resignation. She was succeeded by the university's permanent replacement, Carol Folt, in 2019. The University created an endowed scholarship in her name in thanks and recognition of her leadership during this tumultuous period. She is currently the Trustee and Adjunct Research Professor at the University of Southern California’s Viterbi School of Engineering.

Austin is a member of the California Council on Science and Technology, the National Academy of Engineering, the American Academy of Arts and Sciences, the International Academy of Astronautics and a fellow of the American Institute of Aeronautics and Astronautics. She is a World 50 executive advisor, fostering peer-to-peer discussions among senior executives from some of the world’s largest companies. She previously served on the board of directors of the Space Foundation on the board of trustees for the National Geographic Society.

She continues to serve on the board of directors of the Chevron Corporation, Amgen Inc., Virgin Galactic Holdings Inc., Horatio Alger Association, National Academy of Engineering and is a life trustee for the University of Southern California. As of May 2022, she holds the position of Lead Director of the Chevron Corporation and is the Chair of the Chevron Board Nominating and Governance Committee.

Austin joined the board of directors of Apple Inc. in January 2024.

== Personal life ==
Austin is married with two children.

== Book ==
In 2016, Austin published a book called Making Space: Strategic Leadership for a Complex World.

== Awards ==
Austin is a recipient of the National Intelligence Medallion for Meritorious Service, the Air Force Scroll of Achievement, and the National Reconnaissance Office Gold Distinguished Service Medal. She was also named Women of the Year award and received the Robert H. Herndon Black Image Award from The Aerospace Group. Austin was also inducted into the Women in Technology International Hall of Fame in 2007, and received the Black Engineer of the Year Award in 2009. The following year, she received the American Institute of Aeronautics and Astronautics' von Braun Award for Excellence in Space Program Management,. She was also elected to the University of Southern California Board of Trustees in the same year. She is a recipient of the 2012 Horatio Alger Award and the 2012 NDIA Peter B. Teets Industry award. She also received the USC Presidential Medallion in 2018. She received an honorary Doctor of Humane Letters from USC in 2019.
