= Zhu Han =

Zhu Han is a John and Rebecca Moores Professor of electrical engineering at the University of Houston. He was named Fellow of the Institute of Electrical and Electronics Engineers (IEEE) in 2014 for contributions to resource allocation and security in wireless communications.

== Education and career ==
Han obtained his B.S. degree in electronic engineering from Tsinghua University in 1997 and then got his M.S. and Ph.D. degrees in electrical and computer engineering from the University of Maryland, College Park in 1999 and 2003 respectively. His PhD advisor was K. J. Ray Liu. From 2000 to 2002, he served as research and development engineer at JDSU in Germantown, Maryland and then served one year as graduate research assistant at the University of Maryland. After serving as research associate at the University of Maryland from 2003 to 2006, Han relocated to Boise State University in Idaho. After two year service there, he moved again, this time to the University of Houston, where he served as assistant, associate, and professor, becoming John and Rebecca Moores Professor in 2018.

== Awards and honors ==
- 2023 ACM Fellow
- 2021 IEEE Kiyo Tomiyasu Award
- 2019 AAA&S member
- 2014 IEEE Fellow
