= C. L. Max Nikias =

Former American university president

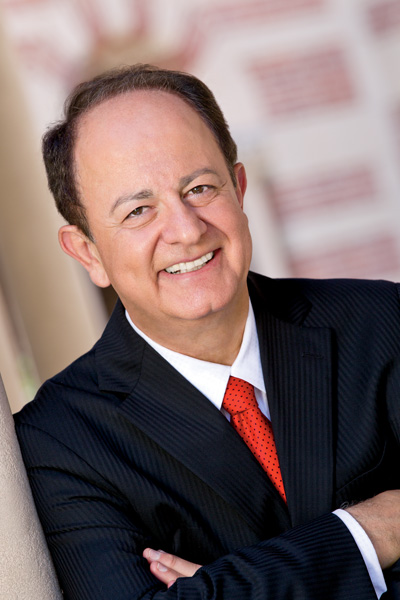

11th President of the University of Southern California
- In office August 3, 2010 – August 7, 2018
- Preceded by: Steven Sample
- Succeeded by: Carol Folt

Personal details
- Born: Chrysostomos Loizos Nikias; September 30, 1952 (age 74) Komi Kebir, Cyprus
- Spouse: Niki (m. 1977)
- Children: 2 daughters
- Education: National Technical University of Athens, University at Buffalo
- Profession: Electrical engineering, Higher education, Academic administration

Chrysostomos Loizos "Max" Nikias (Greek: Χρυσόστομος Λοΐζος Νικίας; born September 30, 1952) is a Cypriot-American academic, and served as the 11th University of Southern California president, a position he held from August 3, 2010, to August 7, 2018. He holds the Malcolm R. Currie Chair in Technology and the Humanities and is president emeritus of the university. He had been at USC since 1991, as a professor, director of national research centers, dean, provost, and president. He also served as chair of the College Football Playoff (CFP) Board of Managers (2015–2018) as chair of the board of the Keck Medical Center at USC (2009–2018), as member of the board of directors of the Alfred Mann Institute for Biomedical Engineering (2001–2018), and as a member of the board of trustees of the Chadwick School, an independent school in Palos Verdes Peninsula, Calif. (2001–2010). He is currently a tenured professor in electrical engineering with a secondary appointment in classics, and the director of the USC Institute for Technology Enabled Higher Education.

In May 2018, 200 tenured USC professors (out of about 1,181 tenured faculty) demanded Nikias's resignation for how his administration dealt with nearly 300 incidents of sexual assault and sexual misconduct allegations over 27 years against a longtime student health center gynecologist, George Tyndall. He and the board of trustees agreed to an orderly transition to a new president on May 25, 2018, and he stepped down on August 7, 2018. Following this, Nikias was named president emeritus and a life trustee of the university. The U.S. Department of Education's Office for Civil Rights' independent investigation concluded with a report published in February 2020 and did not implicate Nikias or his predecessor in any specific wrongdoing.

Nikias served on the board of directors of Synopsys, Inc., (NASDAQ: SNPS), an S&P 500 semiconductor chips company from 2011 to 2023, where he chaired its compensation committee. Nikias is the current president of the advisory board of the Council for International Relations – Greece. He lectures and moderates panels on the geopolitical storms surrounding semiconductor chips and their supply chain, as well as on cybersecuring democratic elections. He also lectures on the promises of economic growth and ethical dilemmas of artificial intelligence (AI), and on Xenophon's Cyropaedia: The Art and Adventure of Leadership.

== Early life ==
Nikias was born on the Mediterranean island of Cyprus. There, he graduated with honors from the Famagusta Gymnasium, a school that emphasizes sciences, history, and Greco-Roman classics. He married his wife, Niki, in 1977, and the couple have two daughters, Georgiana and Maria. He received a degree in electrical and mechanical engineering from the National Technical University of Athens in 1977, and has an academic interest in Athenian drama and democracy. Nikias earned a master's degree in 1980 and a Ph.D. in 1982 in electrical engineering at the State University of New York at Buffalo. His predecessor as USC president, Steven Sample, was likewise an electrical engineer, and served as president of SUNY-Buffalo from 1982 to 1991.

== Career ==
Nikias was a professor at Northeastern University in the Electrical Engineer School. Taught classes in Digital Signal Processing, Acoustic Signal Processing, Multi-Dimensional Signal Processing as well as many other signal processing classes. He taught these classes around the late 80's until he went onto becoming the Associate Dean in 1991.

=== Associate Dean and Center Director in the USC Viterbi School of Engineering (1991–2001) ===
Nikias served as founding director of the school's Integrated Media Systems Center (IMSC) from 1996 to 2001. He led the engineering school's effort to secure the center in an intense national competition conducted by the National Science Foundation that included 116 other proposals. Nikias also served as associate dean of the engineering school from 1992 to 2001. While his research work ranged from signal processing and biomedical engineering to digital communications and military radar and sonar, he is best known for his understanding of multimedia's defining place in the future of the internet and the IMSC.

=== Dean of the USC Viterbi School of Engineering (2001–2005) ===
From 2001 to 2005, Nikias served as dean of the USC Viterbi School of Engineering, solidifying its position as a top-tier engineering school. He directed the expansion of the school's biomedical engineering enterprise and developed its distance-learning program into one of the largest in the country at that time. He oversaw the development of the school's Tutor Hall of Engineering. He also established key partnerships with corporations, among them Pratt & Whitney, Airbus, Boeing, Chevron, and Northrop Grumman, and led a fundraising campaign that brought in more than $250 million, capped by a $52 million school-naming gift from Andrew and Erna Viterbi. Nikias was instrumental in supporting the Information Sciences Institute in the USC Viterbi School, and in working with faculty across the university to establish two National Science Foundation (NSF) Engineering Research Centers (ERC), as well as the Department of Homeland Security's first Research Center of Excellence at USC.

=== USC provost (2005–2010) ===
From June 2005 to August 2010, Nikias served as USC's provost and chief academic officer. He was instrumental in bringing USC trustee Steven Spielberg's Shoah Foundation Institute and its vast video archive of 55,000 testimonies of Holocaust survivors to USC. Nikias also established the university's Edward R. Roybal Institute on Aging, Stevens Center for Innovation, U.S.-China Institute, and Levan Institute for Humanities and Ethics. He launched Visions and Voices, USC's campus-wide arts and humanities initiative, as well as a grant program to advance scholarship in the humanities and social sciences. Nikias spearheaded the integration of the Keck School of Medicine of USC's faculty practice plans, oversaw the transfer of University Hospital and USC Norris Cancer Hospital from Tenet Healthcare Corporation to the university, and recruited a new leadership team for USC's medical enterprise.

=== USC president (2010–2018) ===
As president, Nikias wrote frequently about a range of nationally significant topics, including the value of—and access to—higher education; the future of online education; the continued importance of the arts and humanities; the art of leadership through the classics; and the role of elite research universities, particularly as economic drivers.

In 2011, Nikias announced a $6 billion fundraising campaign, which—at the time of its launch—was the largest in the history of higher education. In six and a half years, USC's campaign surpassed the $6 billion mark—18 months ahead of schedule—bringing to the university, on the average, $900 million per year. The fundraising campaign raised a total of $7 billion in eight years. The Chronicle of Higher Education has called Nikias a "prodigious fundraiser." During Nikias' tenure, USC consistently ranked among the top five universities, along with Stanford and Harvard, in cash charitable donations.

Nikias brought the nation's largest literary festival, the Los Angeles Times Festival of Books, to USC. In addition, under his leadership, the university embarked on a major capital construction initiative that already includes Wallis Annenberg Hall for journalism, the USC Michelson Center for Convergent Bioscience, Dauterive Hall for social sciences, Fertitta Hall for business, the Kaufman International Dance Center, the McKay Center for athletics, Uytengsu Aquatics Center, the Engemann Student Health Center, a new Cinematic Arts building, and the University Club at Stoops, as well as the Soto Building, Currie Residential Hall, and Norris Consultation Center on the Health Sciences Campus, and beautification projects for both of USC's campuses. The most prominent project, though, is the USC Village, a 1.3 million square-foot center of student residential colleges, that opened in 2017, entirely reimagining the university's landscape.

In recognition of his efforts to renew USC's athletic heritage, The New York Times selected Nikias as one of a small number of national figures "who make sports' little corner of the world a better place."

During his tenure as president, USC rose in both ranking and reputation. Nikias introduced a number of strategic initiatives, and was focused on faculty recruitment and the expansion of the medical enterprise; broadening USC's international presence; improving the diversity and quality of the student body; improving the university's infrastructure, including the development of the USC Village; and bringing to closure the university's fundraising campaign.

In 2016, The Wall Street Journal's Times Higher Education's rankings placed USC at No. 17 among 1,061 colleges and universities. Only three universities west of Chicago ranked in the top 20: USC, Stanford, and Caltech.

Nikias received a $7.7 million exit package from USC in 2018. In 2017, Nikias earned roughly $2.4 million from USC.

=== Stepping down as USC president (2018) ===
In May 2018, Nikias and the USC board of trustees agreed to an orderly transition to a new president, following a sex abuse scandal regarding USC's student health center's gynecologist and questions about how the university handled it.

Over 200 tenured USC professors called for the resignation of Nikias, saying that he had "lost the moral authority to lead." There were concerns over how the university dealt with sexual misconduct allegations against a longtime student health center gynecologist George Tyndall. The allegations are that for decades over three different university administrations, Tyndall conducted improper pelvic exams on female students, especially students from China, many of whom were seeing a gynecologist for the first time, and made sexually and racially inappropriate comments.

In a letter to USC's board of trustees, a group of faculty members wrote that they had come together to "express our outrage and disappointment over the mounting evidence of President Nikias' failure to protect our students, our staff, and our colleagues from repeated and pervasive sexual harassment and misconduct." According to USC Trustees, however, the internal investigation of the Tyndall matter did not reveal "moral failing in university leadership... it occurred because non-academic offices such as human resources did not advance with the rest of the university." In a letter to the USC community, Nikias expressed sympathy and compassion for the students and acknowledged the university community's distress. Before agreeing to step down as president, he presented an in-depth plan for changing the campus culture, revisiting the university's core values, and restructuring the university's operations.

After Nikias stepped down in August 2018, Rick Caruso, chair of the USC board of trustees, said: "As he has always done, Max is taking this action in what he believes to be in the best interest of the university following controversies that have arisen from the unfortunate and unacceptable acts of others. From our investigations, which are not yet completed, we have found absolutely no wrong doing on Max's part."

In February 2020, following its independent investigation, the U.S. Department of Education's Office for Civil Rights published its report. It did not implicate Nikias in any specific wrongdoing. The report stated that " Furthermore, in interviews with OCR, senior University administrators, including President 2 and the Provost, professed to have had little to no knowledge of Employee 1’s matter, other than what the Office of General Counsel told them, and they were consistent in their statements to OCR that they were told by the Office of General Counsel that Employee 1’s conduct involved harassing words and outdated medical practices, with no mention of the possibility of physical misconduct." As soon as Nikias was made aware of the gynecologist situation, the report stated that he had identified the matter "to be of such significance that he directed the general counsel to brief the university's Board of Trustees" in March 2018; and on May 15, 2018, he informed all USC students and alumni worldwide about the matter in advance of the Los Angeles Times article. The report also says: "OCR has determined that the evidence supports a conclusion that the University violated the Title IX implementing regulations at 34 C.F.R. §§ 106.8(b) and 106.31. The evidence showed that since at least 2000, the University had notice of possible sexual harassment by Employee 1 of patients and systemically failed at multiple points in time and at multiple levels of responsibility to respond promptly and effectively to notice of the alleged sexual harassment; and that its failure may have allowed female students to be subjected to continuing sex discrimination."

Nikias subsequently became President Emeritus and a Life Trustee of the university, as well as director of the USC Institute for Technology Enabled Higher Education.

=== Research ===
Nikias is recognized internationally for his research on digital signal processing, digital media systems, and biomedicine. The U.S. Department of Defense has adopted a number of his innovations and patents in sonar, radar, and communication systems. He has authored more than 275 journal articles and conference papers, three textbooks, and eight patents, and has mentored more than 30 Ph.D. and postdoctoral scholars. Three of his publications received best papers awards.

== Awards and honors ==
Nikias is a fellow of the American Academy of Arts and Sciences, a charter fellow of the National Academy of Inventors, an associate member of the Academy of Athens, a life fellow of the Institute of Electrical and Electronics Engineers, and a fellow of the American Association for the Advancement of Science. He was named a Fellow of the Institute of Electrical and Electronics Engineers (IEEE) in 1991 when he was 38. Fewer than 2 percent of IEEE's 350,000 members have been named Fellow, and only 5 percent of those achieved that honor by age 38. He was also elected a member of the National Academy of Engineering in 2008 for contributions to the development and diverse applications of adaptive signal processing, and for leadership in engineering education.

Among numerous other honors, he has received the IEEE Simon Ramo Medal, an Academic Leadership Award from Carnegie Corporation of New York, the Ellis Island Medal of Honor, the Woodrow Wilson Center's Award for Public Service, UNICEF's Spirit of Compassion Award, as well as the State University of New York at Buffalo's Distinguished Alumni Award and Clifford C. Furnas Memorial Award. He also received honorary doctorates from Hebrew Union College-Jewish Institute of Religion; his alma mater, the National Technical University of Athens; the University of Cyprus; University of Crete; University of Piraeus; and University of Strathclyde. Nikias was awarded the Aristeia medal, the Republic of Cyprus' highest honor in the letters, arts, and sciences. In addition, he received the USC Black Alumni Association's Thomas Kilgore Service Award, the Los Angeles Police Museum's Jack Webb Award, and earned a commendation for cutting-edge research from the governor of California. He has also received an Outstanding Teacher Award from the National Technological University, a distance learning university.

== Personal life ==
Nikias lived on the Palos Verdes Peninsula, an area southwest of Los Angeles, with his wife and two daughters. Following his inauguration as president of USC, he and his family moved to San Marino, located closer to both USC campuses. He and his wife Niki currently live in Manhattan Beach, California.

== Publications ==
- Nikias, C. L and Shao, M. Signal processing with alpha-stable distributions and applications. New York: Wiley, c1995. xiii, 168 p. : ill.; 25 cm. ISBN 0-471-10647-X
- Nikias, C. L. and Petropulu, A. P. Higher-order spectra analysis: a nonlinear signal processing framework. Englewood Cliffs, N.J. : PTR Prentice Hall, c1993. xxii, 537 p. : ill.; 25 cm. ISBN 0-13-678210-8
- J. G. Proakis, C. Rader, F. Ling, and C. L. Nikias. Advanced Signal Processing. Macmillan Publishing Company, 1992. ISBN 0023968419

Academic offices
Preceded by Steven B. Sample	11th President of the University of Southern California; August 3, 2010 – August 7, 2018	Succeeded by Wanda Austin (interim)
