= Wade Trappe =

American computer scientist

Wade Trappe is a professor of electrical and computer engineering at the Department of Electrical and Computer Engineering, Rutgers University, and an associate director of the Wireless Information Network Laboratory (WINLAB).

Trappe received his B.A. in mathematics from the University of Texas at Austin in 1994 and his Ph.D. in applied mathematics and computational science from the University of Maryland, College Park, in 2002. Trappe was an editor for IEEE Transactions on Information Forensics and Security, IEEE Signal Processing Magazine and IEEE Transactions on Mobile Computing and was the SPS' representative to the IEEE Signal Processing Society's governing board of IEEE TMC.

He was named Fellow of the Institute of Electrical and Electronics Engineers (IEEE) in 2014 "for contributions to information and communication security".
