= Beibei Wang (engineer) =

Chinese-American electrical engineer

Beibei Wang (born 1983) is a Chinese-American electrical engineer known for her research in wireless sensor networks, cognitive radio, and the use of cooperative game theory in wireless communication. She is vice president for research at Origin Wireless, Inc.

== Education and career ==
Wang earned a bachelor's degree in electrical engineering in 2004 from the University of Science and Technology of China. She completed her Ph.D. at the University of Maryland, College Park, in 2009. Her doctoral dissertation, Dynamic Spectrum Allocation and Sharing in Cognitive Cooperative Networks, was supervised by K. J. Ray Liu.

After postdoctoral research at the University of Maryland, she worked for Qualcomm from 2010 to 2014. In 2015, she joined Origin Wireless, which her advisor had founded in 2013.

== Books ==
Wang is the coauthor of

- Cognitive Radio Networking and Security: A Game-Theoretic View (2010)
- Wireless AI: Wireless Sensing, Positioning, IoT, and Communications (2019)

== Recognition ==
Wang was named an IEEE Fellow, in the 2024 class of fellows, "for contributions to wireless sensing and cognitive communications".
