= Kung Yao =

American professor (born 1938)

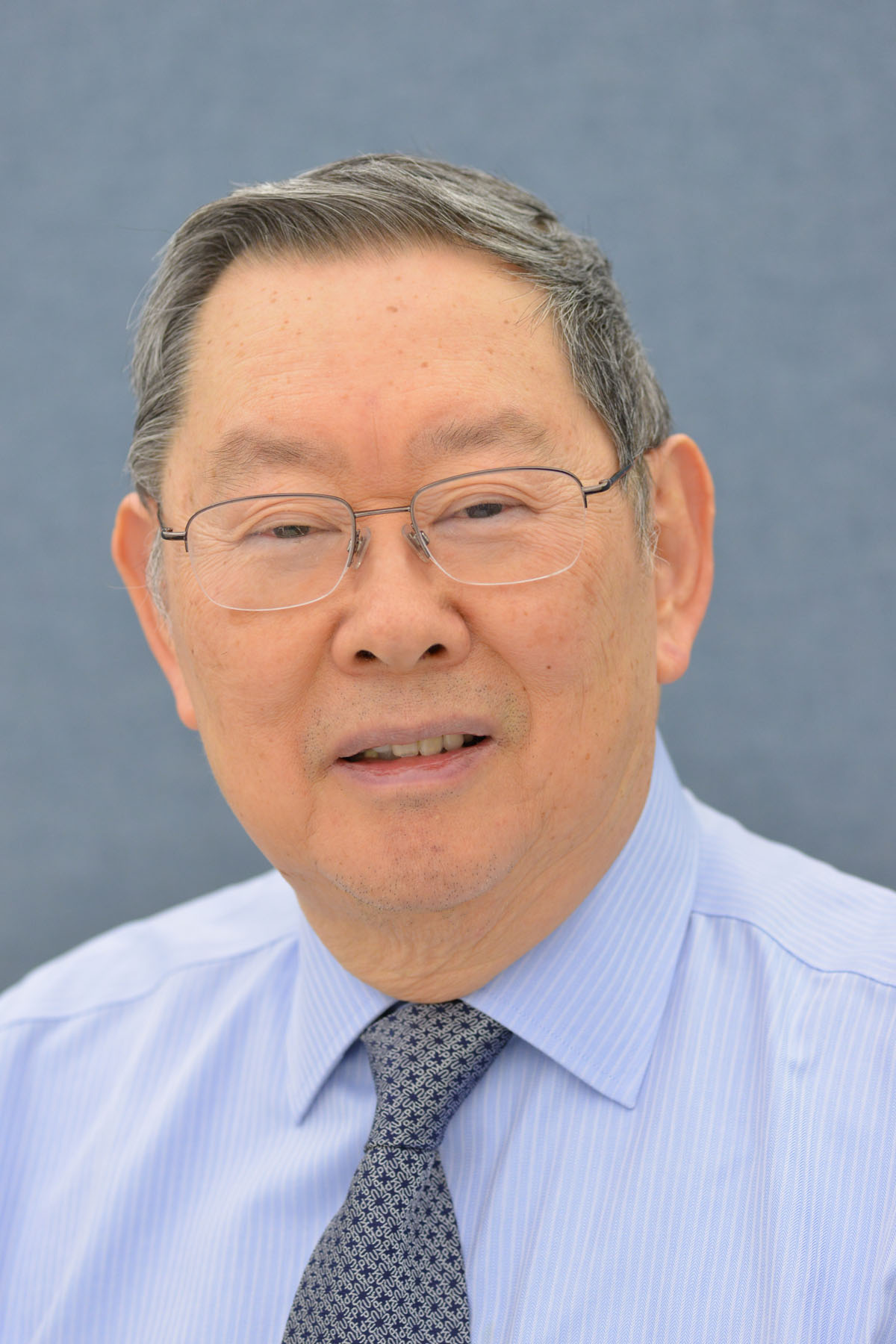
Yao in 2015

Kung Yao (born November 24, 1938) is a Distinguished Professor Emeritus in the Electrical Engineering Department of UCLA known for his contributions in Communication Theory, Signal and array processing, and Systolic algorithms.

== Academic career ==
Kung Yao graduated with a summa cum laude B.S. degree in electrical engineering (1961) and continued to the doctoral program at Princeton University. After finishing his doctoral study (1965), he was a NAS-NRC Postdoctoral Fellow at University of California, Berkeley, (1965–1966). He joined UCLA as an assistant professor in 1966. After 49 years, he retired as a distinguished professor emeritus and a research professor. During his tenure, he served as an assistant dean of the HSSEAS (1985–1988) and as the chair of the Faculty Executive Committee (legislature body of the faculty members) of Henry Samueli School of Engineering and Applied Science, HSSEAS (2001-2003). In his sabbaticals, he was a visiting assistant professor at M.I.T. (1968-1969), and was the Royal Society Kan Tong Po Visiting Professor at Hong Kong Polytechnic University (2007)

== Professional Contributions ==
Kung Yao has many publications in IEEE (Institute of Electrical and Electronic Engineering). He is a co-author of a two-volume series of an IEEE Reprint Book, "High Performance VLSI Signal Processing" (1997); and the lead co-author of the book, "Detection and Estimation for Communication and Radar Systems", Cambridge University Press (2013).

Kung Yao worked at The Henry Samueli School of Engineering and Applied Science (HSSEAS), University of California, Los Angeles. His professional interests include: communication theory, systolic and VLSI algorithms, and signal/array processing.

== Recent Awards ==
In 2003, Kung Yao was named IEEE Life Fellow after being an IEEE Fellow since 1993 for contributions in communication theory, signal theory, and systolic algorithms. He has received the Best Paper Award of the Journal of Communications and Networks (2011); IEEE Communications Society/IEEE Information Theory Society Joint Paper Award (2008); and IEEE Signal Processing Society's Senior Award in VLSI Signal Processing (1993).
