= Yan Lindsay Sun =

Chinese-American power engineer

Yan Lindsay Sun is a Chinese-American power engineer whose research focuses on cyber-physical systems security and the security of power grids. She is a professor in and chair of the Department of Electrical, Computer and Biomedical Engineering at the University of Rhode Island.

Sun graduated from Peking University in 1988. After completing a Ph.D. at the University of Maryland, College Park in 2004, advised by K. J. Ray Liu, she joined the University of Rhode Island in the same year.

She was elected as an IEEE Fellow in 2018, "for contributions to trust modeling and statistical signal processing for cyber-physical security". In 2022, the University of Maryland Department of Electrical and Computer Engineering gave her their Distinguished Alumni Award.
