= Athina Petropulu =

American electrical engineer

Athina Petropulu FAAAS, FIEEE
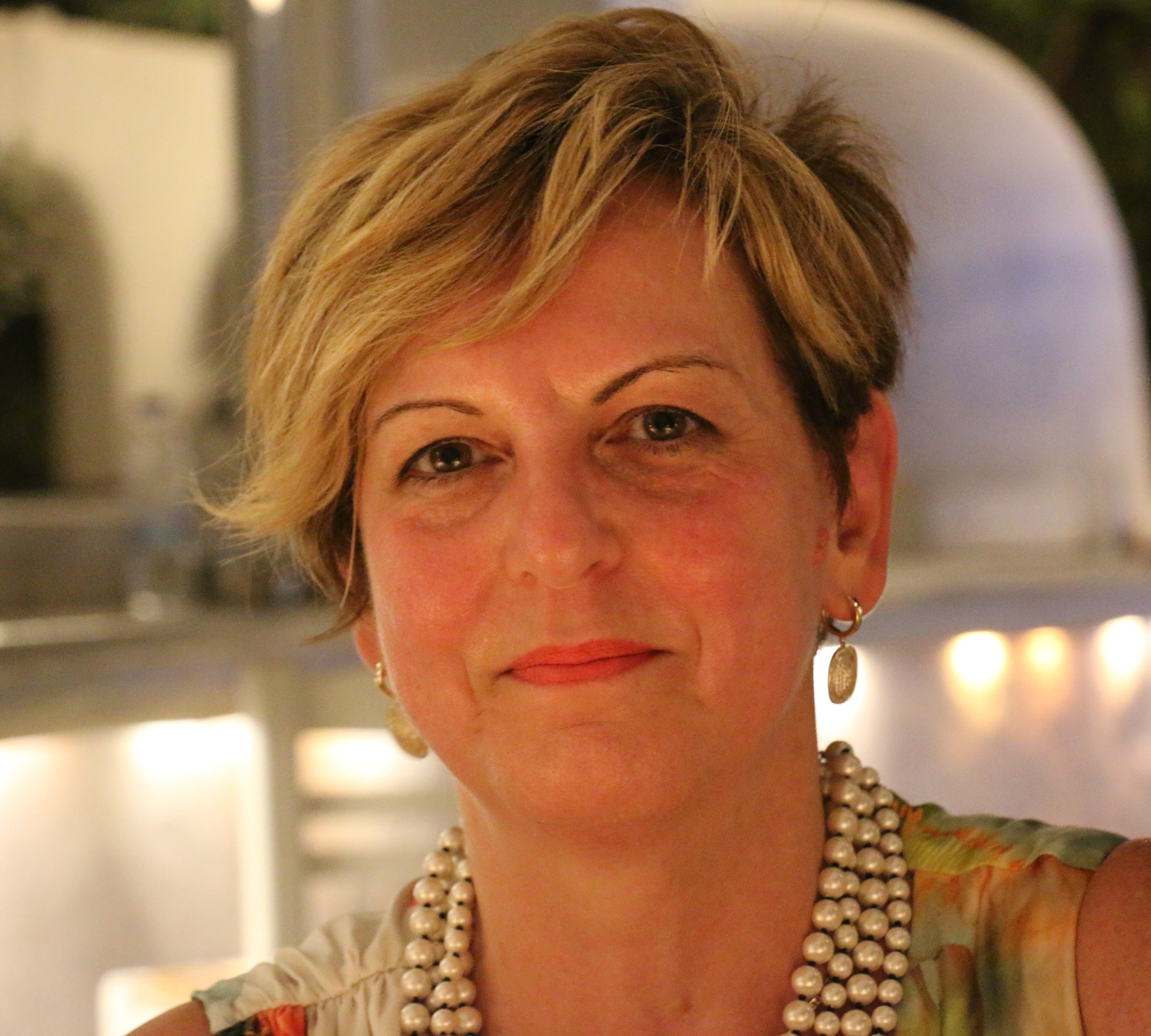
- Petropulu in 2024.
- Born: Kalamata, Greece
- Occupations: Electrical engineer, researcher, academic

Academic background
- Education: Northeastern University
- Thesis: Signal Image Reconstruction from the Phase of the Bispectrum (1990)
- Doctoral advisor: C. L. Max Nikias

Academic work
- Discipline: Engineering
- Sub-discipline: Electrical and computer engineering
- Institutions: Rutgers University (2010-present), Drexel University (1992-2010)

Athina Petropulu (born in Kalamata Greece) is a Greek electrical engineer, researcher and academic. She is Distinguished Professor in the Electrical and Computer Engineering (ECE) Department at Rutgers, The State University of New Jersey. She has made contributions in signal processing, wireless communications and networks, and radar systems. She received many awards for her work in these areas.

== Education ==
Petropulu received her Diploma in Electrical Engineering from the National Technical University of Athens in 1986. She then pursued her graduate studies at Northeastern University in Boston, earning her M.Sc. in Electrical and Computer Engineering in 1988 and her Ph.D. in Electrical and Computer Engineering in 1991 under the supervision of C. L. Max Nikias.

== Professional career ==
From 1992 to 2010, Petropulu was a professor in the ECE department at Drexel University. Then she joined the Rutgers ECE Department in 2010 as a professor, and served as chair of the department from 2010 to 2016.

As of 2017, Petropulu is a Distinguished Professor in Rutgers ECE. She held appointments as a visiting scholar at SUPELEC, Universite' Paris Sud (1999-2000), and the University of Southern California (2016-2017). She has been visiting research collaborator at the Department of Electrical Engineering of Princeton University (2017–present).

Petropulu is a Fellow of both IEEE and AAAS, and was elected and served as the president of the IEEE Signal Processing Society (SPS) in the term of 2022-2023. She is also a former Editor-in-Chief of the IEEE Transactions on Signal Processing in the term of 2009-2011.

Petropulu has also served as General Chair or General Co-Chair of well-known academic conferences, such as the 2005 IEEE International Conference on Acoustics Speech and Signal Processing (ICASSP) and the 2018 IEEE International Workshop on Signal Processing Advances in Wireless Communications (SPAWC). She was also Distinguished Lecturer of both IEEE SPS (2017-2018) and IEEE Aerospace and Electronic Systems Society (2019-2020).

== Publications ==
=== Books ===
- Higher-Order Spectra Analysis: a Nonlinear Signal Processing Framework, Prentice-Hall, Inc., 1993 (with C. L. Max Nikias)

=== Journal articles ===
- Xu, Z. and Petropulu, A., 2023. A bandwidth efficient dual-function radar communication system based on a MIMO radar using OFDM waveforms. IEEE Transactions on Signal Processing, vol. 71, pp. 401–416.
- Xu, Z., Shi, C., Zhang, T., Li, S., Yuan, Y., Wu, C.-T., Chen, Y. and A. Petropulu, A. 2022. Simultaneous monitoring of multiple people's vital signs leveraging a single phased-MIMO radar. IEEE Journal of Electromagnetics, RF, and Microwaves in Medicine and Biology, 6(3), pp. 311–320.
- Evmorfos, S., Diamantaras, K. and Petropulu, A., 2022. Reinforcement Learning for Motion Policies in Mobile Relaying Networks. IEEE Transactions on Signal Processing, vol. 70, pp. 850–861.
- Zhang, J.A., Liu, F., Masouros, C., Heath, R.W., Feng, Z., Zheng, L. and Petropulu, A., 2021. An overview of signal processing techniques for joint communication and radar sensing. IEEE Journal of Selected Topics in Signal Processing, 15(6), pp. 1295–1315.
- Sun, S., Petropulu, A. and Poor, H.V., 2020. MIMO Radar for ADAS and Autonomous Driving: Advantages and Challenges. IEEE Signal Processing Magazine, 37(4).
- Liu, F., Masouros, C., Petropulu, A.P., Griffiths, H. and Hanzo, L., 2020. Joint radar and communication design: Applications, state-of-the-art, and the road ahead. IEEE Transactions on Communications, 68(6), pp. 3834–3862.
- Kalogerias, D. S. and Petropulu, A., 2018. Spatially controlled relay beamforming, 2-stage QoS enhancement distributed policies. IEEE Transactions on Signal Processing, 66(24), pp. 6418 – 6433.
- Liu, F., Zhou, L., Masouros, C., Li, A., Luo, W. and Petropulu, A., 2018. Toward dual-functional radar-communication systems: Optimal waveform design. IEEE Transactions on Signal Processing, 66(16), pp. 4264–4279.
- Li, B. and Petropulu, A.P., 2017. Joint transmit designs for coexistence of MIMO wireless communications and sparse sensing radars in clutter. IEEE Transactions on Aerospace and Electronic Systems, 53(6), pp. 2846–2864.
- Li, B., Petropulu, A.P. and Trappe, W., 2016. Optimum co-design for spectrum sharing between matrix completion based MIMO radars and a MIMO communication system. IEEE Transactions on Signal Processing, 64(17), pp. 4562–4575.
- Zheng, G., Krikidis, I., Li, J., Petropulu, A.P. and Ottersten, B., 2013. Improving physical layer secrecy using full-duplex jamming receivers. IEEE Transactions on Signal Processing, 61(20), pp. 4962–4974.
- Li, J., Petropulu, A.P. and Weber, S., 2011. On cooperative relaying schemes for wireless physical layer security. IEEE transactions on signal processing, 59(10), pp. 4985–4997.
- Yu, Y., Petropulu, A.P. and Poor, H.V., 2010. MIMO radar using compressive sampling. IEEE Journal of Selected Topics in Signal Processing, 4(1), pp. 146–163.
- Dong, L., Han, Z., Petropulu, A.P. and Poor, H.V., 2009. Improving wireless physical layer security via cooperating relays. IEEE transactions on signal processing, 58(3), pp. 1875–1888.

== Other Awards and honors ==
- IEEE Communications Society Stephen O. Rice Prize (2023)
- Technical Program co-Chair, 2023 IEEE Int. Conference on Acoustics Speech and Signal Processing (ICASSP), Kos, Greece
- IEEE Signal Processing Society Young Author Best Paper Award (with F. Liu) (2021)
- Barry Carlton Best Paper Award, IEEE Aerospace and Electronic Systems Society (2021)
- IEEE Signal Processing Society Young Author Best Paper Award (with B. Li) (2020)
- Member-at-Large, IEEE Signal Processing Board of Governors (2018-2019)
- President, ECE Department Heads Association (ECEDHA) (2015)
- IEEE Signal Processing Society Meritorious Service Award (2012)
- Great Master, University of Electronic Science and Technology of China (2012)
- IEEE Signal Processing Society VP Conferences (2006-2009)
- General Chair, IEEE Int. Conf. on Acoustics, Speech and Signal Processing (ICASSP) (2005)
- IEEE Signal Processing Magazine Best Paper Award (2005)
- Presidential Faculty Fellow Award (The White House/NSF), 1995
