= Sue-Jane Wang =

Biostatistician

Sue-Jane Wang is a biostatistician at the United States Food and Drug Administration (FDA), where she works as the Biostatistics Lead and as the liaison from the Office of Biostatistics to the FDA Center for Drug Evaluation and Research (CDER) Biomarker Qualification Program. She is also deputy division director for biometrics in the Office of Biostatistics.

== Education and career ==
Wang earned a master's degree in statistics from the University of Missouri in 1984, a second master's degree in biostatistics from the University of California, Los Angeles in 1986, and a Ph.D. in biostatistics from the University of Southern California in 1993.

She has been a senior expert statistician at the FDA since 2004, and a former distinguished faculty member in CDER. For many years she was associate director for Adaptive Design and Pharmacogenomics.

She was editor-in-chief of the Journal of Pharmaceutical Statistics from 2006 to 2008, and of the International Chinese Statistics Association Bulletin from 2000 to 2002.

== Recognition ==
In 2011, Wang was elected to be a Fellow of the American Statistical Association. She is also an Elected Member of the International Statistical Institute.
