= IEEE Transactions on Multimedia =

- Discipline: Communications Engineering, Multimedia Computing
- Language: English
- Edited by: Honggang Wang

Publication details
- History: 1999–present
- Publisher: Institute of Electrical and Electronics Engineers
- Frequency: Bimonthly
- Impact factor: 9.7 (2024)

Standard abbreviations
- ISO 4: IEEE Trans. Multimed.

Indexing
- CODEN: ITMUF8
- ISSN: 1520-9210 (print); 1941-0077 (web)
- LCCN: sn98001721
- OCLC no.: 39625562

Links
- Journal homepage; Online access

IEEE Transactions on Multimedia is a bimonthly peer-reviewed scientific journal covering multimedia technology and applications. It was established in 1999 and is published by the IEEE Computer Society, IEEE Communications Society, IEEE Circuits and Systems Society, and IEEE Signal Processing Society. The editor-in-chief is Honggang Wang. According to the Journal Citation Reports, the journal has a 2024 impact factor of 9.7.
