= IEEE Transactions on Information Forensics and Security =

- Discipline: Electrical engineering, Computer science and Communications
- Language: English
- Edited by: Luisa Verdoliva

Publication details
- History: 2006–Present
- Publisher: Institute of Electrical and Electronics Engineers (USA)
- Frequency: Monthly
- Impact factor: 8 (2024)

Standard abbreviations
- ISO 4: IEEE Trans. Inf. Forensics Secur.

Links
- Journal homepage

The IEEE Transactions on Information Forensics and Security is a scientific journal published by the IEEE Signal Processing Society (IEEE SPS). The journal is co-sponsored by several of the subject societies that make up the IEEE: IEEE Communications Society, IEEE Computational Intelligence Society, IEEE Computer Society, IEEE Engineering in Medicine and Biology Society, and the IEEE Information Theory Society.

Its inaugural issue was published in March 2006. Its current publication frequency is 12 issues per year.

The journal describes its scope as "the sciences, technologies, and applications relating to information forensics, information security, biometrics, surveillance and systems applications that incorporate these features."

According to the Journal Citation Reports, it has a 2020 impact factor of 7.178.
