= Zhen Jane Wang =

Chinese-Canadian signal processing researcher

Zhen Jane Wang is a Chinese-Canadian signal processing researcher whose research includes work on statistical signal processing, image fusion, digital video fingerprinting, biological network inference, and deep learning. She is a professor in the Department of Electrical and Computer Engineering at the University of British Columbia, and the editor-in-chief of IEEE Signal Processing Letters.

== Education and career ==
Wang graduated from Tsinghua University in 1996. She went to the University of Connecticut for graduate study in electrical engineering, earning a master's degree in 2002 and completing her Ph.D. in 2002. Her doctoral supervisor there was Peter K. Willett.

After postdoctoral research at the University of Maryland, College Park from 2002 to 2004, Wang joined the faculty of the University of British Columbia in 2004.

She is editor-in-chief of the signal processing journal IEEE Signal Processing Letters.

== Recognition ==
In 2017, Wang was elected as an IEEE Fellow, "for contributions to statistical signal processing for multimedia security and brain data analytics". Wang is a Fellow of the College of New Scholars, Artists and Scientists of the Royal Society of Canada, elected into the cohort of 2017. She was elected to the Canadian Academy of Engineering in 2018.
