= IEEE Signal Processing Society =

Society of the Institute of Electrical and Electronics Engineers

The IEEE Signal Processing Society (IEEE SPS) is one of the nearly 40 technical societies of the Institute of Electrical and Electronics Engineers (IEEE) and the first one created. Its mission is to "advance and disseminate state-of-the-art scientific information and resources; educate the signal processing community; and provide a venue for people to interact and exchange ideas."

== History ==
The Signal Processing Society was formed in 1948 as the Professional Group on Audio of the Institute of Radio Engineers.

== Activities ==
The Society organizes many conferences every year and operates local chapters around the world. It coordinates the operation of several councils, task forces, and technical committees.

=== Publications ===
The Signal Processing Society oversees the publication of several periodicals, including a magazine (IEEE Signal Processing Magazine), a newsletter (Inside Signal Processing e-Newsletter), and multiple scholarly journals:

- IEEE Journal of Selected Topics in Signal Processing
- IEEE Signal Processing Letters
- IEEE Transactions on Audio, Speech, and Language Processing
- IEEE Transactions on Image Processing
- IEEE Transactions on Information Forensics and Security
- IEEE Transactions on Signal Processing

Co-sponsored journals include:

- IEEE Computing in Science and Engineering Magazine
- IEEE MultiMedia Magazine
- IEEE Sensors Journal
- IEEE Transactions on Computational Imaging
- IEEE Transactions on Medical Imaging
- IEEE Transactions on Mobile Computing
- IEEE Transactions on Multimedia
- IEEE Transactions on Signal and Information Processing over Networks
- IEEE Transactions on Wireless Communications

The IEEE Signal Processing electronic Library (SPeL) is a comprehensive digital library and electronic collection of more than 50 years of the IEEE Signal Processing Society's periodicals, which includes all four transactions and letters, newsletters, magazines, and technical proceedings of the two major Society conferences and of most workshops. IEEE SPeL also features four joint transactions, which the Society is a partner. The library collection is available on three DVD-ROMs. It has a search engine, which allows searches based on full-text, as well as searches by such fields as author, title, subject and date. The collection provides a comprehensive database, which contains information about the technical articles that are published in the Society's journals.

=== Conferences ===
The IEEE Signal Processing Society organizes and sponsors technical conferences, symposia, and workshops dedicated to providing opportunities to network with peers from around the world and to exchange high-quality, rigorously peer-reviewed scientific and technological knowledge.

The two flagship conferences of the IEEE Signal Processing Society are:

- IEEE International Conference on Acoustics, Speech, and Signal Processing (ICASSP)
- IEEE International Conference on Image Processing (ICIP)

A list of all conferences and workshops can be found here.

== See also ==
- International Conference on Acoustics, Speech, and Signal Processing (ICASSP)
