= David J. Love =

American professor of engineering (born 1979)

- Born: May 18, 1979; Garland, TX
- Education: The University of Texas at Austin
- Scientific career
- Fields: Wireless communications Signal processing
- Workplaces: Purdue University
- Doctoral advisor: Robert W. Heath Jr.

David J. Love is an American professor of engineering at Purdue University. He has made numerous contributions to wireless communications, signal processing, information theory, and coding. Much of his research has centered on understanding how feedback and other forms of side information can be utilized during communication.

== Early life and education ==
Love completed his B.S. (with Highest Honors) and M.S. degrees, both in electrical engineering, at the University of Texas at Austin in 2000 and 2002, respectively. He received his Ph.D. in electrical engineering from UT Austin in 2004 under the supervision of Robert W. Heath Jr. During his M.S. and Ph.D., Love developed the paradigm of codebook-based limited feedback, which has become a key technology in almost all modern communication systems.

== Professional career ==
Love was appointed as an assistant professor at Purdue University in 2004. In 2009, he was promoted to associate professor, and in 2013, he was made full professor. In 2012, he was recognized as a University Faculty Scholar at Purdue. His is now the Nick Trbovich Professor of Electrical and Computer Engineering at Purdue. He serves as director of the NextG Center for Wireless Communications and Sensing (XGC) at Purdue. He also serves as a thrust co-leader in the NSF IoT for Precision Agriculture (IoT4Ag) Engineering Research Center (ERC).

== Research contributions ==
Love's research interests are in the general areas of communication theory, information theory, signal processing, and coding. He has made numerous contributions to multiple-input multiple-output (MIMO) communication, millimeter wave communication, feedback-based communication, broadband communication, low-EM exposure techniques, non-orthogonal multiple access, sensing, and software defined radios and networks.

Starting at UT Austin, Love and Heath pioneered multiple-input multiple-output (MIMO) feedback strategies in particularly inventing limited feedback precoding, a form of which is currently found in IEEE 802.11 WLAN, Wimax cellular, LTE, and 5G NR cellular standards. They showed that codebook-based beamforming is related to the famous applied mathematics problem of Grassmannian line packing. They also showed how MIMO precoding also can be understood as subspace packing.

Working with collaborators, he showed how communication at millimeter wave frequencies can be understood as a form of beam alignment. This viewpoint became widespread in both academia and industry. Beam-based communication at millimeter wave frequencies is included in 5G.

Working with James Krogmeier and students at Purdue, Love made numerous contributions to software defined radio (SDR) and software defined networks. He co-advised a team in the DARPA Spectrum Collaboration Challenge (SC2) that finished in the top-ten in the first phase event, top-five in the second phase event, and eleventh in the final phase. Previously, he co-advised the Purdue team that was a finalist in the DARPA Spectrum Challenge.

== Professional activities ==
Love is a Fellow of the IEEE. He has been particularly involved in the Signal Processing Society, Communication Society, Information Theory Society, and the Vehicular Technology Society branches of the organization. He was editor (2008–2011) of the IEEE Transactions on Communications and was associate editor (2011–2013) of the IEEE Transactions on Signal Processing.

== Awards and honors ==
Love is a Fellow of the IEEE, a Fellow of the American Association for the Advancement of Science, and a Fellow of the National Academy of Inventors. He received the IEEE Communications Society Stephen O. Rice Prize in the Field of Communications Theory for his work on millimeter wave communication and the Fred Ellersick Prize for his work on non-orthogonal multiple access. He won an IEEE Signal Processing Society best paper award in 2015 for work on massive MIMO. His work on body-area MIMO was recognized with the Jack Neubauer Memorial Award by the IEEE Vehicular Technology Society.

== Selected publications ==
- D. J. Love, R. W. Heath Jr., and T. Strohmer, Grassmannian Beamforming for Multiple-Input Multiple-Output Wireless Systems, IEEE Trans. on Info. Theory special issue on MIMO Communication, vol. 49, pp. 2735-2747, Oct. 2003.
- S. Hur, T. Kim, D. J. Love, J. V. Krogmeier, T. A. Thomas, A. Ghosh, Millimeter Wave Beamforming for Wireless Backhaul and Access in Small Cell Networks, IEEE Trans. Communications vol. 61, no. 10, pp. 4391-4403, Oct. 2013.
- J. Choi, D. J. Love, and P. Bidigare, "Downlink Training Techniques for FDD Massive MIMO Systems: Open-Loop and Closed-Loop Training with Memory," IEEE Journal of Selected Topics in Signal Pro- cessing, vol. 8, no. 5, pp. 802–814, Oct. 2014.
- D. J. Love, R. W. Heath Jr., and T. Strohmer, Grassmannian Beamforming for Multiple-Input Multiple-Output Wireless Systems, IEEE Trans. on Info. Theory special issue on MIMO Communication, vol. 49, pp. 2735-2747, Oct. 2003.
