= Vaneet Aggarwal =

Researcher and Professor

Vaneet Aggarwal is a researcher and academic in the field of machine learning. He currently holds the position of Reilly Professor and University Faculty Scholar and Professor at Purdue University. He leads the maChine Learning and quANtum computing (CLAN) research labs at Purdue.

Aggarwal earned his B.Tech. degree in 2005 from Indian Institute of Technology, Kanpur, India. He obtained M.A. and Ph.D. degrees in 2007 and 2010, respectively, from the electrical engineering department of Princeton University in Princeton, NJ, USA. His Ph.D. dissertation was supervised by Prof. Robert Calderbank.

Aggarwal joined Purdue University in January 2015 and is currently a Reilly Professor and University Faculty Scholar. Prior to this, he was a researcher at AT&T Labs-Research, Florham Park, NJ (2010-2014). He was Adjunct Assistant Professor at Columbia University (EE, 2013-2014), VAJRA Chair Professor at IISc Bangalore (ECE, 2018-2019), Adjunct Faculty at IIIT Delhi (CS, 2022-2023), and Visiting Professor at KAUST, Saudi Arabia (CS, 2022-2023).

His work has been recognized with numerous awards and honors. Notably, he was the recipient of Princeton University's prestigious Porter Ogden Jacobus Honorific Fellowship in 2009, which is the highest honor bestowed upon a graduate student at Princeton University. Purdue University awarded him the Most Impactful Faculty Innovator Award in 2021. Dr. Aggarwal's contributions to the academic community have been acknowledged with several prestigious awards, including the 2017 IEEE Jack Neubauer Memorial Award for the Best Systems Paper published in the IEEE Transactions on Vehicular Technology, 2024 IEEE Communications Society William R. Bennett Prize for the outstanding original paper published in IEEE/ACM Transactions on Networking or the IEEE Transactions on Network and Service Management, the 2018 IEEE Infocom Workshop Best Paper Award, and the 2021 NeurIPS Workshop Best Paper Award.

His work "HADAR: Heat-Assisted Detection and Ranging" has appeared on the cover of NATURE, and has been covered in NATURE podcast episode and multiple news. His work on understanding the natural language of DNA with foundation models is mentioned in Axios.

He was on the Editorial Board of the IEEE Transactions on Green Communications and Networking and the IEEE Transactions on Communications. He is currently serving on the Editorial Board of the IEEE/ACM Transactions on Networking and is co-Editor-in-Chief of the ACM Journal on Transportation Systems
