= Xiaodong Wang (electrical engineer) =

- 王晓东
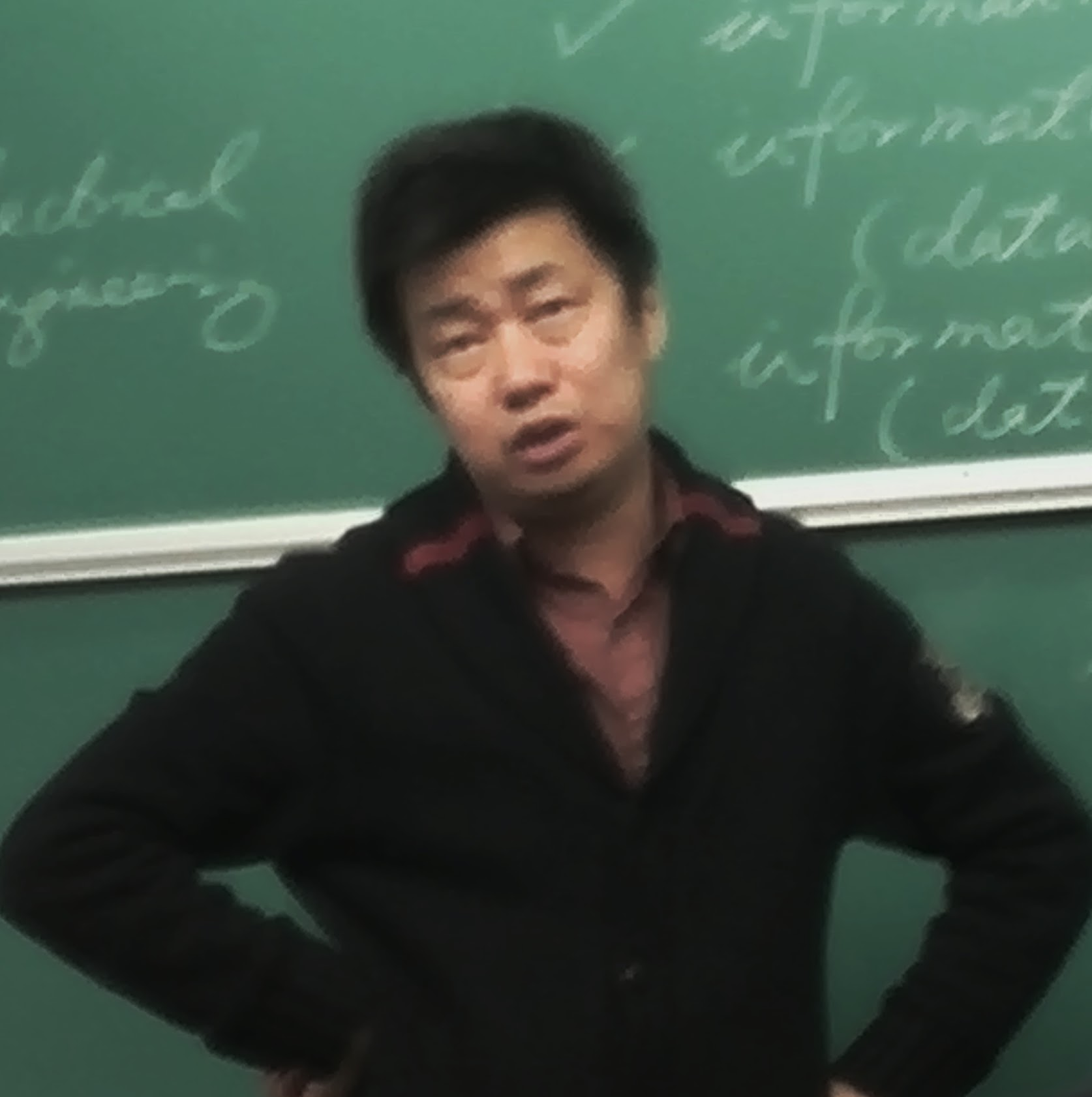
- Citizenship: United States
- Education: Shanghai Jiao Tong University (BSc); Purdue University (MSc); Princeton University (PhD)
- Known for: Wireless communication systems, genomics signal processing
- Awards: NSF CAREER Award (1999); IEEE Fellow
- Scientific career
- Fields: Electrical engineering, information theory, signal processing
- Workplaces: Columbia University; Texas A&M University
- Doctoral advisor: Vincent Poor
- Doctoral students: Mehdi Ashraphijuo
- Website: www.ee.columbia.edu/~wangx/

Xiaodong Wang (Chinese: 王晓东; pinyin: Wáng Xiǎodōng) is a Chinese-born American electrical engineer and information theorist. He currently serves as a professor of Electrical Engineering at Columbia University. He earned a BS degree in electrical engineering and applied mathematics from Shanghai Jiaotong University, an MS degree in electrical and computer engineering from Purdue University, and a PhD from Princeton University in electrical engineering. He formerly served as assistant professor of Electrical Engineering at Texas A&M University before he joined Columbia as an assistant professor in January 2002.

He is an IEEE Fellow and an ISI Highly Cited author. He has won numerous prestigious awards, among them the National Science Foundation CAREER Award in 1999 and the IEEE Communications Society and Information Theory Society Joint Paper Award in 2001. He also won the 2011 IEEE Communication Society Award for Outstanding Paper on New Communication Topics. He has been an editor of journals such as IEEE Transactions on Communications, the IEEE Transactions on Wireless Communications, the IEEE Transactions on Signal Processing, and the IEEE Transactions on Information Theory. He served as associate editor for detection and estimation on the publications committee of the IEEE Information Theory Society from 2003 to 2006. He has presented at the Wireless and Optical Communications Conference.

Wang has many research interests, but chooses to focus on the areas of information theory, signal processing, and communications. Furthermore, he has influential published research in the areas of wireless communications, statistical signal processing, parallel and distributed computing, nanoelectronics, and quantum computing. In 2003 he published a book entitled Wireless Communication Systems: Advanced Techniques for Signal Reception, published by Prentice Hall. Recently he is also working on the emerging field of genomics signal processing and information theoretic genomics.
