= Wang Xiaodong =

Wang Xiaodong or Xiaodong Wang may refer to:

- Wang Xiaodong (born 1960) (王晓东), Chinese politician, Governor of Hubei
- Wang Xiaodong (born 1962) (王小东), Chinese politician, Communist Party Secretary of Nanning
- Xiaodong Wang (biochemist) (王晓东; born 1963), Chinese-born American biochemist
- Xiaodong Wang (electrical engineer) (王晓东), Chinese-born American electrical engineer
