= Yucel Altunbasak =

Turkish academic

Professor Yucel Altunbasak was born in Kayseri, Turkey in 1971. He attended Izmir Science High School in Izmir, Turkey. He received his B.S. degree with high honors from the Department of Electrical and Electronics Engineering at Bilkent University, Ankara, in 1992. Afterward, he moved to the USA and studied at the Department of Electrical and Computer Engineering at the University of Rochester, New York, where he received his M.S. and Ph.D. degrees, in 1993 and 1996, respectively.

In 1997 and 1998, while employed at Hewlett-Packard's Palo Alto Research Laboratories in Silicon Valley, California as a research engineer, he also worked as a consultant assistant professor at Stanford University and a lecturer at San Jose State University. After three years in Silicon Valley, he returned to academic life as an assistant professor at the Georgia Institute of Technology Department of Electrical and Computer Engineering, where he became an associate professor with tenure in 2004 and a full professor in 2009. Prof Altunbasak has supervised 19 Ph.D. students and is the author of more than 200 papers and 50 patents/patent applications.

Prof. Altunbasak has served as an editor for several leading research journals and chaired many industrial associations. He was an associate editor for “IEEE Transactions on Image Processing”, “IEEE Transactions on Signal Processing”, “Signal Processing: Image Communications” and “Circuits, Systems and Signal Processing” journals. He also served as a guest editor for “Wireless video” and “Video networking” special issues of “Signal Processing : Image Communications” journal, “Network-aware multimedia processing and communications” special issue of "IEEE Journal on Selected Topics on Signal Processing” journal, and “Realizing the Vision of Immersive Communications” special issue of "IEEE Signal Processing Magazine". He was elected to IEEE Signal Processing Society Image and Multi-dimensional Signal Processing (IMDSP), IEEE Signal Processing Society Bio-Imaging and Signal Processing, IEEE Signal Processing Society Multimedia Signal Processing (MMSP) Technical Committees. He also served as the vice-president for the IEEE Communications Society Multimedia Communications Technical Committee. He served as the technical program chair for IEEE Int. Conf. on Image Processing (ICIP'06). He co-chaired “Advanced Signal Processing for Communications” Symposia on IEEE International Conference on Communications (ICC’03), chaired Multimedia Networking Technical Tracks on IEEE International Conference on Multimedia and Expo (ICME’04 and ICME'04), panel sessions on International Conference on Information Technology: Research and Education (ITRE’03), and Video Networking special session on IEEE Int. Conf. on Image Processing (ICIP’04).

In addition to his academic work, Prof Altunbasak has continuously worked in collaboration with industry. He licensed and successfully prototyped a MPEG video compression device for a satellite and cable TV company. He initiated and was the driving force behind an image processing technology called ‘Pixellence’, which received the Special Jury Award of the Turkish Industry and Business Association while working as a senior advisor to the company Vestel.

Between 2009 and 2011, he served as the Rector of TOBB University of Economics and Technology in Turkey. He was instrumental in founding six new departments, including the Departments of Psychology, Architecture, Political Science, Biomedical Engineering, Material Science and Nanotechnology, English Literature, and College of Law, hired 70 new faculty members, and improved the attractiveness of the university as measured by the National University Entrance Exam Department Scores.

Prof. Altunbasak was appointed as the President of TÜBİTAK between 2011 and 2015 by the Minister of Science, Industry, and Technology, the Prime Minister, and the President of Turkey. During his tenure, several initiatives to bolster the research, development, innovation and entrepreneurship ecosystems in Turkey have been instituted, including 1003, 1004, 1511, 1512, 1513, 1514, 1515, 4003, 4006 programs and technology roadmaps. For the first time in Turkey, special funds have been designed for priority areas and entrepreneurs. The total budget of externally-supported projects carried out at TÜBİTAK Institutes increased from 1.3 billion TL to 4.8 billion TL. He led the institutes to successfully complete and deploy such projects as the first domestic high-resolution LEO satellite (GÖKTÜRK-2) the first domestic locomotive (E1000), national digital ID card, national fuel marker, first cruise-missile (SOM), first ground-penetrating ammunition (NEB), precision guidance kit (HGK). He also initiated several externally-funded projects of national importance (e.g., national communications satellite (TURKSAT 6A), national hydro (MILHES), thermal (MILTES), wind (MILRES2), and solar (MILGES) power plants, and several defense projects (for example BOZOK, GÖKTUĞ, GEZGİN). He also helped raise the number of academic project applications from 5030 to 9613/year and the number of industrial project applications from 1725 to 3072/year. He introduced innovative incentives for faculty members (e.g., project performance awards) as well as universities (performance-based overhead rates of up to 50%). He successfully negotiated Turkey’s association to Horizon 2020 program. He initiated bilateral R&D agreements with 33 countries. He promoted the public understanding of science by organizing “science fairs” at all high schools.

Prof. Altunbasak served on the executive boards of ROKETSAN between 2012 and 2016, KOSGEB between 2011 and 2015, and Vocational Qualification Corporation between 2011 and 2012. He also served on the advisory board of the Department of Electrical Engineering, Bilkent University, Ankara, Turkey between 2003 and 2009. He also served as the TOBB ETU rector in The Interuniversity Council (UAK) between 2009 and 2011.

Prof. Altunbasak has received numerous awards. He received the National Science Foundation (NSF) CAREER award (2002). He has been a co-author for the article that received the “most cited paper award” of the Journal of Signal Processing: Image Communication in 2008. He was also a co-author for two conference papers that received the “best student paper award” at VCIP 2006 and ICIP 2003. He was also co-author for a conference paper that received the “second place award” at EMBS’04 Design Competition. He received “Outstanding Junior Faculty Award” at the School of Electrical and Computer Engineering, Georgia Tech (2003). He was named Fellow of the Institute of Electrical and Electronics Engineers (IEEE) in 2012 for contributions to super-resolution imaging, color filter array interpolation, and error-resilient video communications.
