= Vincent Poor =

American electrical engineer

Professor Vincent Poor FRS FREng
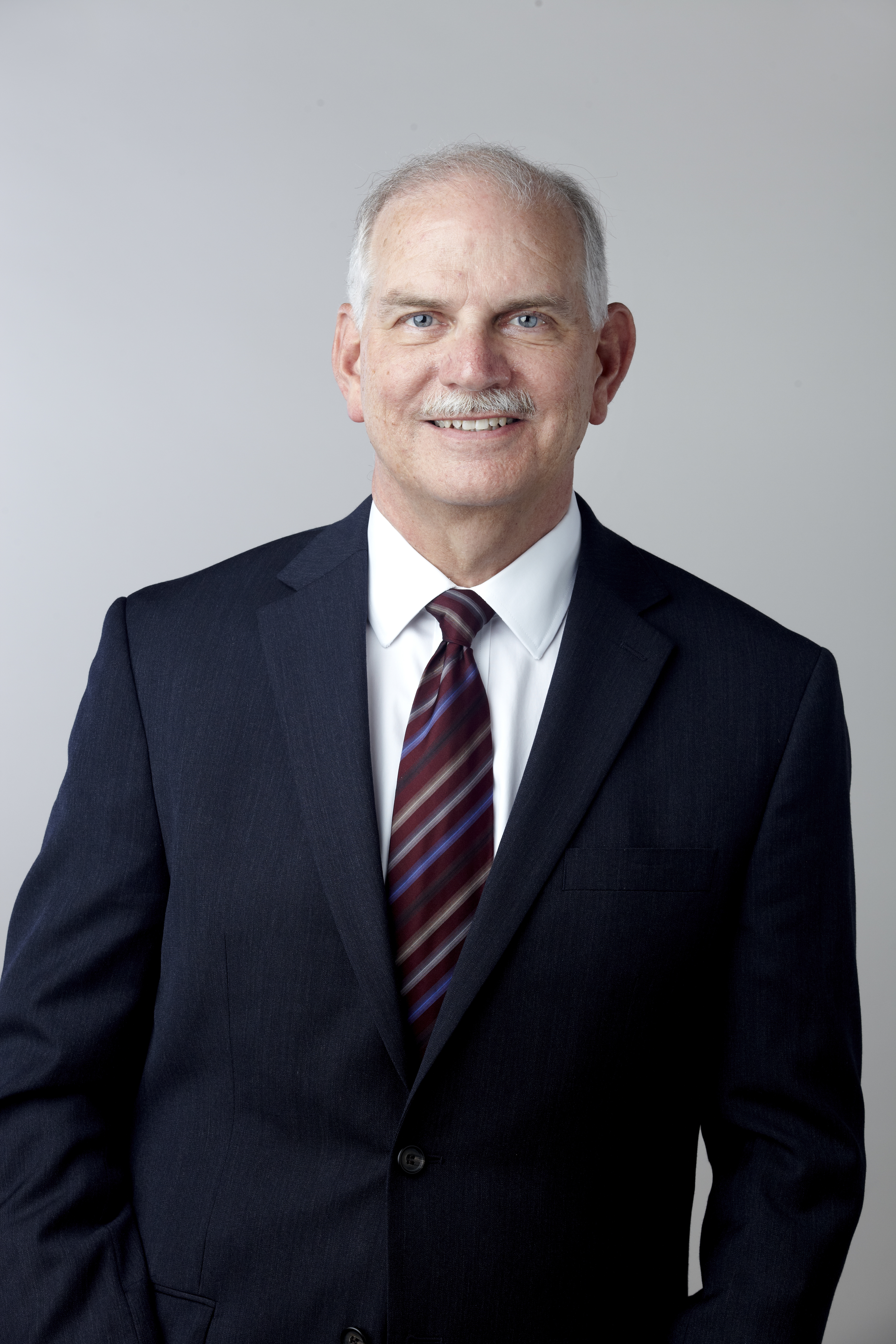
- Vincent Poor in 2014, portrait via the Royal Society
- Born: Harold Vincent Poor; 2 October 1951 (age 75)
- Education: Auburn University; Princeton University (PhD)
- Known for: contributions to signal detection and estimation and their applications in digital communications and signal processing.
- Awards: IEEE Alexander Graham Bell Medal (2017) Member, CAS (2017); John Fritz Medal (2016); FRS (2014); Fellow RSE (2013); Member, NAS (2011); IET Achievement Medals (2010); FREng (2009); Member, NAE (2001); AAAS Fellow (1991) IEEE Fellow for contributions to the theory of robust linear filtering applied to signal detection and estimation (1987)
- Scientific career
- Doctoral advisor: John B. Thomas
- Doctoral students: Behnaam Aazhang; Urbashi Mitra; Leslie Rusch; Sergio Verdu; Xiaodong Wang

Harold Vincent Poor is the Michael Henry Strater University Professor of Electrical Engineering at Princeton University, where he is also the Interim Dean of the School of Engineering and Applied Science. He is a specialist in wireless telecommunications, signal processing and information theory. He has received many honorary degrees and election to national academies. He was also President of IEEE Information Theory Society (1990). He is on the board of directors of the IEEE Foundation.

== Education ==
Poor received a BSEE degree from Auburn University in 1972, and a MSEE from there in 1974. In 1977, he received his PhD from Princeton University. From 1977 to 1990, he was a faculty member of the University of Illinois at Urbana–Champaign. From 1990, he joined Princeton University as a professor.

== Research ==
His research interests lie in the areas of stochastic analysis, statistical signal processing and information theory, and their applications in a number of fields including wireless networks, social networks, and smart grid. This research work has attracted over 10,000 citations. He has published a book on Signal Detection and Estimation. This book is considered the definitive reference in the subject. He was reported to have made a particular impact in the field of wireless communications.

== Awards ==
He was inducted National Academy of Engineering in 2001, into the American Academy of Arts & Sciences in 2005, and into the National Academy of Sciences in 2011. He was inducted as International Fellow of the UK Royal Academy of Engineering in 2009, as Corresponding Fellow of the Royal Society of Edinburgh in 2013, as Foreign Member of the Royal Society of London, UK in 2014, and as Foreign Member of the Chinese Academy of Sciences in 2017. He was inducted as Fellow of the IEEE in 1987 for contributions to the theory of robust linear filtering applied to signal detection and estimation, of the American Association for the Advancement of Science in 1991, of the Institute of Mathematical Statistics in 2001, of the Optical Society of America in 2001, and of the Institution of Engineering and Technology in 2010. In addition, he received a Guggenheim Fellowship in 2002.

He has received the IEEE Eric Sumner Technical Field Award (2011), the IET Ambrose Fleming Medal for Achievement in Communications Engineering (2010), the Aaron D. Wyner Distinguished Service Award, IEEE Information Theory Society (2008), the IEEE James H. Mulligan Education Medal (2005), and the IEEE Alexander Graham Bell Medal (2017).

He received a DSc honoris causa from University of Edinburgh (2011), a DEng honoris causa from Hong Kong University of Science and Technology (2012), a DTech honoris causa from Aalborg University (2012), an Honorary Doctorate from Aalto University in 2014, and an honorary Doctor of Science degree from Syracuse University in 2017.

In 2024, he was made an honorary member of the Royal Irish Academy.

Awards
Preceded by Chai Keong Toh	IET Achievement Medals - IET Ambrose Fleming Medal; 2010	Succeeded by Christos Christopoulos
Preceded by Roberto Padovan	IEEE Alexander Graham Bell Medal; 2017	Succeeded by Nambirajan Seshadri
