= IEEE Transactions on Molecular, Biological and Multi-Scale Communications =

- Discipline: Signal processing, Communications, Nanotechnology, Information theory
- Language: English
- Edited by: Chan-Byoung Chae

Publication details
- History: 2015–present
- Publisher: Institute of Electrical and Electronics Engineers (USA)
- Frequency: Quarterly

Standard abbreviations
- ISO 4: IEEE Trans. Mol. Biol. Multi-Scale Commun.

Indexing
- ISSN: 2332-7804

Links
- Journal homepage; Online access; National Library of Medicine journal info

The IEEE Transactions on Molecular, Biological and Multi-Scale Communications is a quarterly peer-reviewed scientific journal published by the Institute of Electrical and Electronics Engineers IEEE Communications Society covering research on molecular and biological signal processing. It was established in 2015.

The first editor-in-chief was Urbashi Mitra.
