= IET Achievement Medal =

IET Achievement Medals
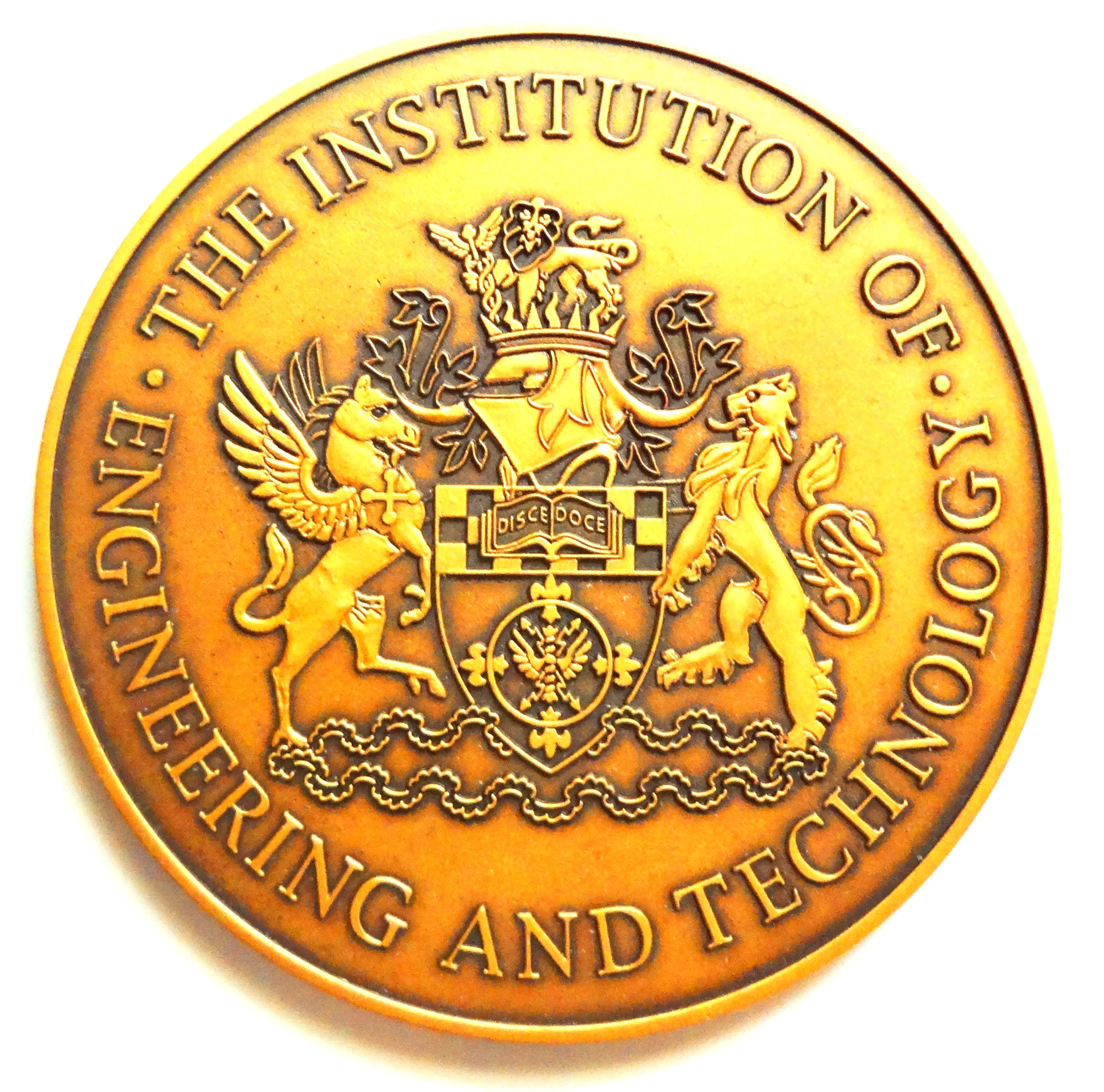
- Awarded for: Exceptional contribution to the advancement of engineering and technology
- Country: United Kingdom
- Presented by: Institution of Engineering and Technology (formerly IEE). Founded in London, 1871.
- First award: 1987
- Website: http://www.iet.org

The Institution of Engineering and Technology (IET) awards achievement medals to recognize engineers who have been significant contribution to various fields in engineering Every year, the award committee seeks and evaluates nominations and makes decision on winners. There is no age limit or nationality requirement. It is an international award.

== Technical Fields ==
The awards are made to recognize specific fields in engineering:

1. Information & Telecommunication
2. Electronics
3. Control Engineering
4. Manufacturing
5. Transport Engineering
6. Environmental Engineering
7. Energy

== Naming of Awards ==
The IET Achievement Medals are named after prominent scientists and engineers. They include:

1. J. J. Thomson - for electronics
2. John Ambrose Fleming - for communications
3. R. E. B. Crompton - for energy
4. Oliver Heaviside - for control
5. Monty Finniston - for general engineering
6. Sarah Guppy - for environment
7. Eric Mensforth - for manufacturing
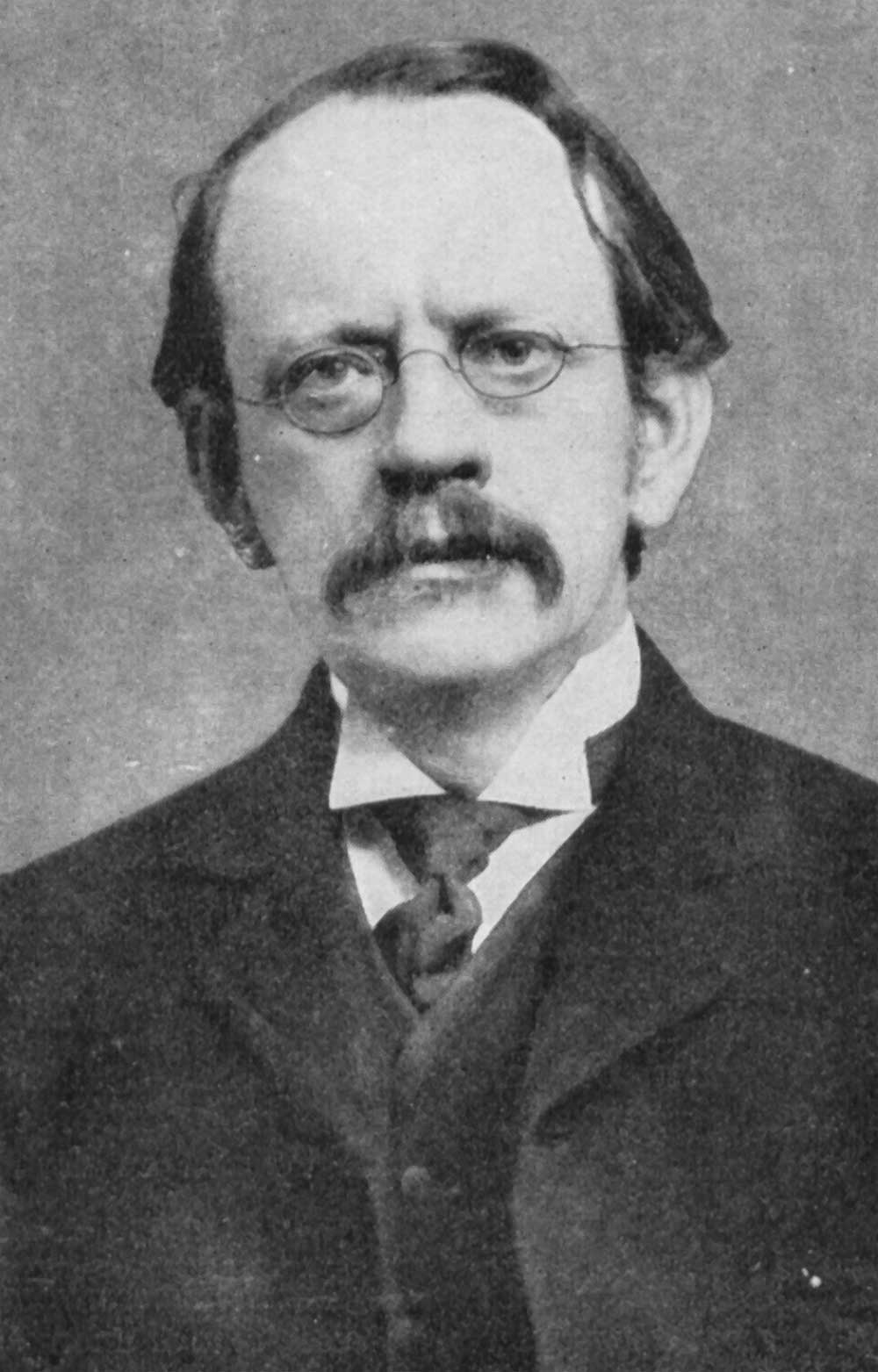
Thomson: Discoverer of Electrons

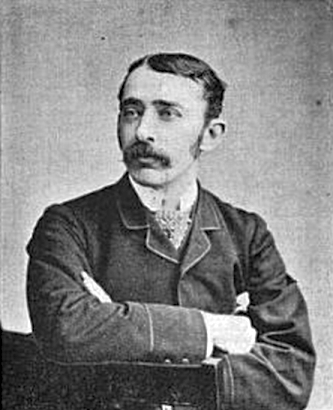
Fleming: Inventor of Vacuum Tubes

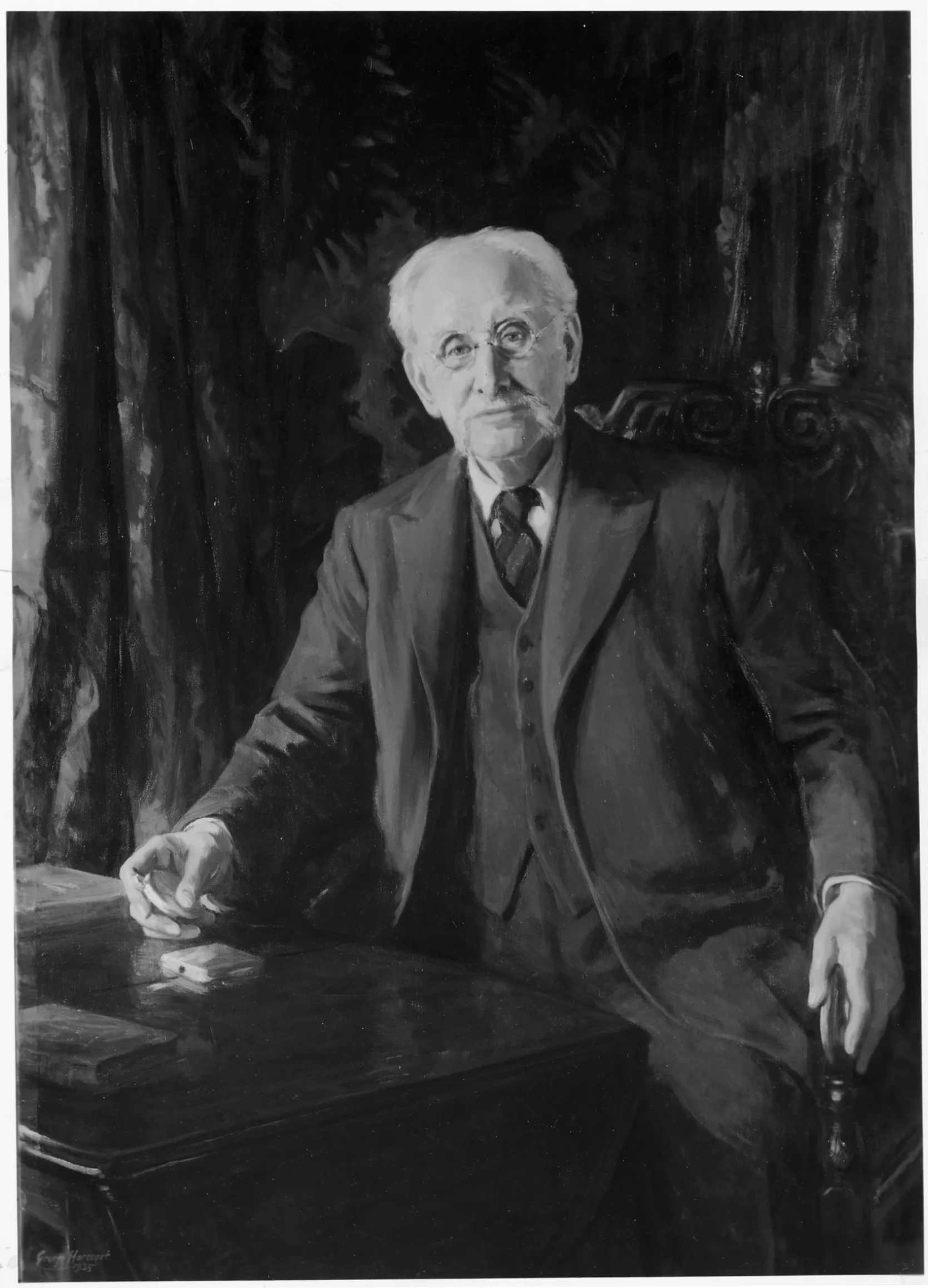
Crompton: Pioneer of Electric Lighting

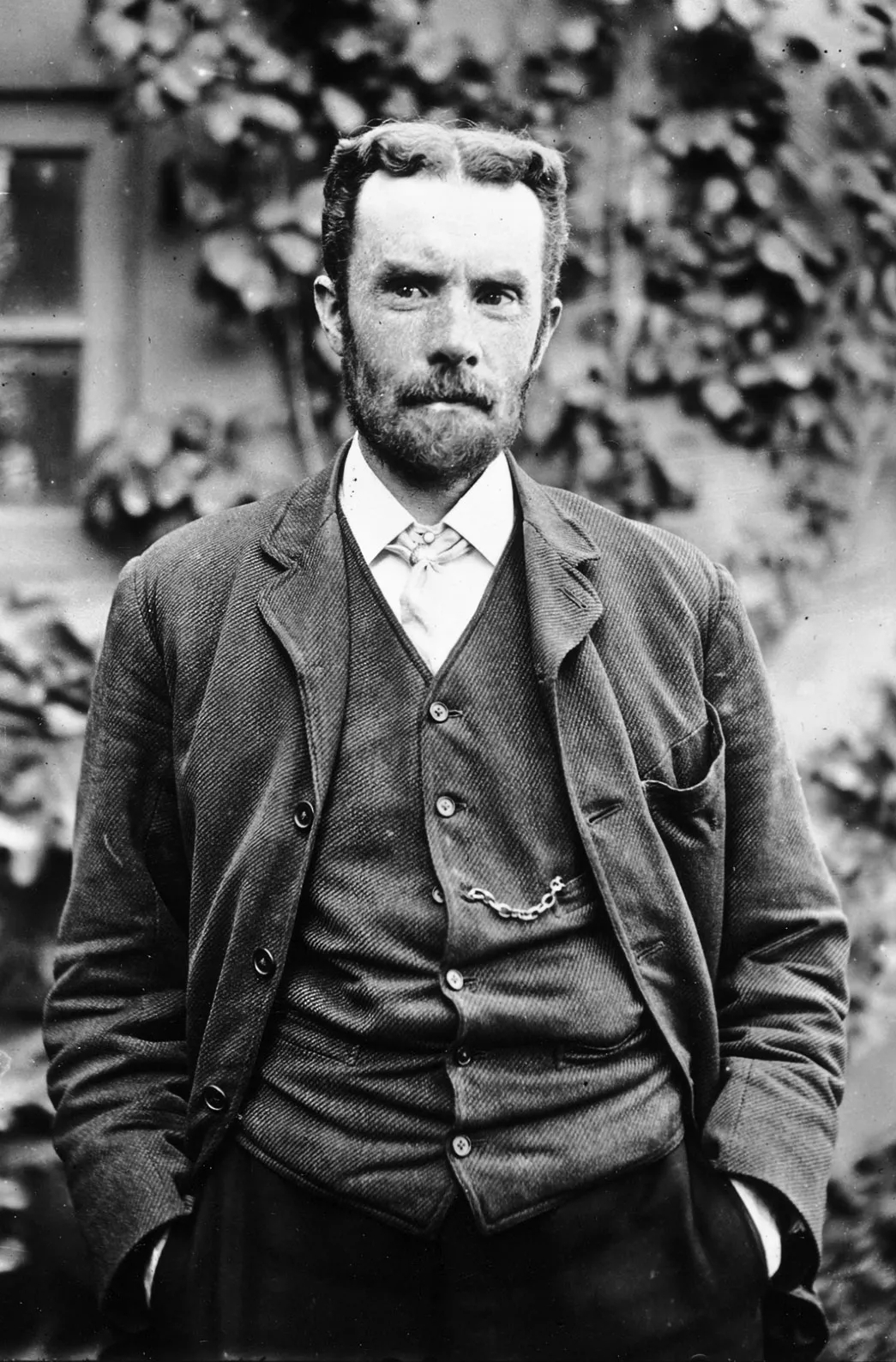
Heaviside: Heaviside Step Function (Control)

The awards are sponsored by several companies, such as BAE Systems, Lockheed Martin, BP, RS, Pace, e-ON, EDF energy networks, GCHQ, Transport for London, etc.

== Award Ceremony ==
Each year, the award is presented in London, UK. The ceremony is attended by the IET President, distinguished guests, winners and their families and industry sponsors of the event. Also at this ceremony, winners of the IET Faraday Medal and recipient of IET Honorary Fellow will also be announced on this occasion. Some photos taken at the award ceremony can be found here.

== Winners ==
An overview of the latest medalists since 2000 is shown below.

IET ACHIEVEMENT MEDAL

- 2025 (Italy) Stefano Pirandola
- 2025 (United Kingdom) Nick Wirth
- 2025 (United Kingdom) David Flynn
- 2025 (United States) John A. Rogers
- 2024 (United Kingdom) Mike E. Davies
- 2024 (United Kingdom) Rob Deaves
- 2024 (United Kingdom) Richard Harris
- 2024 (Pakistan) Muhammad Ali Imran
- 2024 (China) Kun Yang
- 2023 (United States) James J. Collins
- 2023 (United Kingdom) David Robert Sime Cumming
- 2023 (United Kingdom) Mark Lythgoe
- 2022 (United Kingdom) Tom Crick
- 2022 (Belgium) Jean-Pierre Raskin
- 2021 (Taiwan) Hsi-Tseng Chou
- 2021 (Germany) Mischa Dohler
- 2021 (United Kingdom) David Holmes
- 2021 (China) Chongqing Kang
- 2021 (China) Xiaohu You

IET J J THOMSON MEDAL

- 2000 (United States) John Cioffi
- 2001 (United States) Ian K Proudler
- 2003 (United Kingdom) John O'Reilly (engineer)
- 2007 (United Kingdom) Julian Gardner
- 2008 (United Kingdom) William Milne
- 2009 (United States) Kam-Yin Lau
- 2011 (United Kingdom) Chris Toumazou
- 2013 (United States) David F Welch
- 2014 (United Kingdom) S Ravi Silva
- 2015 (United States) Asad Madni
- 2016 (United States) Alan E. Willner
- 2017 (United States) M. C. Frank Chang
- 2018 (United Kingdom) Nigel M Allinson
- 2019 (United States) Chenming Hu

IET AMBROSE FLEMING MEDAL

- 2007 (United Kingdom) Simon Kingsley
- 2008 (India) Brijendra K Syngal
- 2009 (Singapore) Chai Keong Toh
- 2010 (United States) Vincent Poor
- 2011 (United Kingdom) C Christopoulous
- 2012 (United Kingdom) Paul Kane
- 2013 (United Kingdom) Barry Evans

IET CROMPTON MEDAL

- 2008 (United Kingdom) John GP Scott
- 2009 (India) Harbans Bajaj
- 2010 (China) Ron Hui
- 2013 (United Kingdom) Graham T Reed

IET HEAVISIDE MEDAL

- 2007 (United Kingdom) Ian Postlethwaite
- 2008 (United Kingdom) Michael J Grimble
- 2009 (United States) Petros Ioannou
- 2012 (United States) Ramesh Agarwal
- 2013 (Canada) Chris Hadfield

IET MENSFORTH MEDAL

- 2006 (United Kingdom) Edward Atkin
- 2007 (United Kingdom) Sir Anthony Bamford
- 2008 (United Kingdom) Sir Alan Jones
- 2010 (Germany) Ralf Speth
- 2013 (United Kingdom) Nigel Whitehead
- 2014 (United Kingdom) Gavin Campbell
- 2016 (United Kingdom) Tom Williams CBE
- 2019 (United Kingdom) Marcus Burton

A full list of winners since 1987 can be found on the IET website.

== See also ==
- List of engineering awards
- List of awards named after people
- IET Faraday Medal
- IET Mountbatten Medal
