= Kaibin Huang =

Chinese Scientist

- Education: National University of Singapore; The University of Texas at Austin
- Scientific career
- Fields: Wireless communications
- Workplaces: The University of Hong Kong
- Academic advisors: Robert W. Heath Jr.; Jeffrey G. Andrews

Chinese name
- Traditional Chinese: 黃凱斌
- Simplified Chinese: 黄凯斌
- Hanyu Pinyin: Huáng Kǎibīn
- Website: www.eee.hku.hk/~huangkb

Kaibin Huang is a professor in the EEE department at The University of Hong Kong and a leading researcher in the area of Wirelessly Powered Communications (WPC).

== Education ==
Kaibin Huang received his Ph.D. in Electrical Engineering from the University of Texas at Austin in 2008 under the supervision of Prof. Jeffrey G. Andrews and Prof. Robert W. Heath Jr. He obtained his B. Eng. (with 1st Class Honors) and M. Eng. degrees from the National University of Singapore in 1998 and 2000, respectively.

== Career ==
Huang started his career as a scientist in the year 2000, where he worked as an associate scientist at the Institute for Infocomm Research in Singapore. At the Institute for Infocomm, Huang developed software defined radio systems. From 2004 to 2008, Huang returned to academia to pursue his Ph.D. degree with the Department of Electrical and Computer Engineering at The University of Texas at Austin. During his tenure at The University of Texas at Austin, Huang interned at Freescale Semiconductor where he performed research on physical layer systems for IEEE 802.16e and 3GPP-LTE standards. During this time, Huang was also a recipient of the Motorola Partnerships in Research Grant, the University of Continuing Fellowship at The University of Texas at Austin, and the Best Student Paper (in Communication Systems category) award at GLOBECOMM 2006.

Upon obtaining his Ph.D., Huang dedicated a year to postdoctoral research as he became a Postdoc Research Fellow at Hong Kong University of Science and Technology. After a year as a Research Fellow, Huang transitioned to an Assistant Professor position, at Yonsei University. As an assistant professor at Yonsei University, Huang received the Outstanding Teaching Award.

After dedicating almost 4 years to Yonsei University, Huang joined the Hong Kong Polytechnic University as an assistant professor. Presently, Huang continues to serve as an adjunct professor at the Hong Kong Polytechnic University and works as assistant professor at the University of Hong Kong. His research interests include analysis and design networks using stochastic geometry and multi-antenna techniques.

Huang is involved in IEEE, frequently serving in the technical program committees for some of the IEEE conferences in wireless communications. Huang is an elected member of the SPCOM Technical Committee of the IEEE Signal Processing Society. An editor for the IEEE Journal on Selected Areas of Communications (JSAC), IEEE Transactions on Wireless Communications, and IEEE Wireless Communications Letters. Huang has also been technical chair for IEEE GLOBECOM 2014 Advance Topics in Wireless Communications Symposium of IEEE/CIC ICCC 2014, IEEE PIMRC 2015, IEEE VTC Spring 2013, Asilomar 2011, and IEEE WCNC 2011.

Huang is a co-author on more than 70 refereed conference and journal publications. Huang is also co-author of two book chapters. In addition, Huang is co-inventor in at least 6 patents.

== Honors and awards ==
- IEEE Fellow (2021), for contributions to wirelessly powered communications and multi-antenna communications
- The Motorola Partnerships in Research Grant,
- The University Continuing Fellowship at The University of Texas at Austin
- The Best Student Paper (in Communication Systems category) award at IEEE Globecom 2006
- Outstanding Teaching Award from Yonsei University
- IEEE ComSoc Asia Pacific Outstanding Paper Award (2015)

== Books ==
- K. Huang and T. Inouve, "Single User Limited Feedback" and "Multi-User Limited Feedback", Advanced MIMO Communications, Cambridge University Press.
- C.-B. Chae, K. Huang, and T. Inouve, "MIMO Technologies for WiMAX Systems: Present and Future", WiMAX Evolution: Emerging Technologies and Applications, Wiley, 2009.
