= Chan-Byoung Chae =

South Korean computer scientist (born 1976)

- 채찬병
- Born: 1976 (age 49–50)
- Occupations: Computer scientist, electrical engineer, and academic
- Awards: Elected to National Academy of Engineering of Korea; IEEE ComSoc Career Award; IEEE SPS Best Journal Paper Award; IEEE INFOCOM/ICC/ WCNC/DySPAN Best Demo Awards; IEEE Access Best Multimedia Awards; NAEK Young Engineer Award; IEEE VTS Dan. Noble Fellowship Award

Academic background
- Education: Ph.D., Electrical and Computer Engineering
- Alma mater: The University of Texas at Austin
- Thesis: Coordinated Wireless Multiple Antenna Networks: Transmission Strategies and Performance Analysis (2008)
- Doctoral advisor: Robert W. Heath Jr.
- Other advisor: Vahid Tarokh

Chan-Byoung Chae (Korean: 채찬병; born 1976) is a South Korean computer scientist, electrical engineer, and academic. He is an Underwood Distinguished Professor and Yonsei Lee Youn Jae Fellow (Endowed Chair Professor), the director of Intelligence Networking Laboratory, and former head of the School of Integrated Technology at Yonsei University, Korea.

Chae has published over 200 papers and has been cited 20,000 times. He has 73 patents awarded in the US and Europe, and more than 100 patents awarded in Korea. His research primarily focuses on the emerging technologies for 6G and molecular communications, with particular attention on nano-communications, MIMO communications, full duplex, semantic communications, open-RAN, cloud, and other advanced communications.

Chae is a Fellow of the Institute of Electrical and Electronics Engineers (IEEE), for contributions to MIMO design and prototypes for emerging communication systems and editor-in-chief of IEEE Transactions on Molecular, Biological and Multi-Scale Communications. He serves as an editor for IEEE Communications Magazine, and IEEE Wireless Communications Letters and IEEE Transactions on Wireless Communications, and IEEE Journal on Selected Areas in Communications. He is also a elected member of the National Academy of Engineering of Korea and fellow of the National Academy of Inventors, USA.

== Education ==
Chae graduated (ranked first) with a master's degree in electrical engineering from Korea Advanced Institute of Science and Technology (KAIST) in 2001. From 2005 till 2008, he was awarded Korea Government Fellowship for his Ph.D. Studies at the University of Texas, and subsequently earned his doctoral degree in electrical and computer engineering in 2008 under the supervision of Robert W. Heath Jr. From 2008 to 2009, he was a postdoctoral fellow and lecturer at Harvard University.

== Career ==
Chae began his academic career as a graduate research assistant at The University of Texas in 2005, upon his admission. He was also appointed there as a teaching assistant and guest lecturer in 2007. In 2011, he joined Yonsei University, and has been serving there as an Underwood Distinguished Professor and Lee Youn Jae Fellow, as the director of the Intelligence Networking Laboratory, and as former head of the School of Integrated Technology since then. At Stanford University, he held an appointment as a visiting professor in 2017. He is also a visiting professor at University of California San Diego in 2024.

Prior to joining UT, Chae was a research engineer at the Advanced Research Lab., the Telecommunications R&D Center, in and Samsung Electronics, Suwon, Korea, from 2001 to 2005. While at Samsung, he participated in the IEEE 802.16e and 3GPP standardization, where he made several contributions and filed a number of related patents. He has also served as a member of technical staff (research scientist) at Bell Laboratories in Murray Hill, New Jersey, in US from 2009 to 2011.

Chae is an IEEE Fellow (nominated by ComSoc) and an IEEE ComSoc Distinguished Lecturer for the term 2020–2023. He is now an IEEE VTS Distinguished Lecturer for the term 2024-2025.

== Research ==
Chae's research spans the fields of next-generation (B5G/6G) communication networks, molecular communication networks, applied machine learning, and applied mathematics.

=== Communication networks ===
Chae discussed the applications of multi-user MIMO (MU-MIMO) networks in terms of revealing the unique opportunities arising from a joint optimization of antenna combining techniques with resource allocation protocols. He conducted a technology readiness analysis of molecular communication, highlighted the recent advancements in the field of MC engineering, and also demonstrated the biological, chemical, and physical processes used by an MC system. In 2008, he proposed a new joint optimization of linear transmit beamforming and highlighted combining vectors for the multiple-input multiple-output (MIMO) broadcast channel. Using Monte Carlo simulations, he evaluated the bit error rate and the sum rate performances of the proposed algorithm, and showed that the proposed method performs close to the sum capacity of the MIMO broadcast channel even with limited feedback. In another study, he proposed four detection algorithms, including adaptive thresholding, practical zero forcing with channel models excluding/including the ILI and ISI, and Genie-aided zero forcing.

While focusing on the vision of an XR-Aided Teleoperation System toward 5G/B5G, Chae presented the applications of extended reality (XR)-aided teleoperation in the context of improving operating efficiency in mission-critical, information-rich, and complex scenarios. He also proposed a mechanism to switch between multiple-input multiple-output (MIMO) with two transmit antennas and single-input multiple-output (SIMO) to conserve mobile terminals' energy. Extensive flow-level simulations under dynamic loads confirm that the proposed technique can reduce the transmission energy by more than 50% and enables an effective tradeoff between file transfer delay and energy conservation.

At Yonsei University, he developed a research program in wireless communications with a strong real-time prototyping component. One area of focus was on full-duplex wireless communications, where the transmitter and receiver at a device can use the same spectrum simultaneously. His group debuted a system on real-time full duplex radios at IEEE GLOBECOM 2014. His group developed and demonstrated more sophisticated full duplex MIMO strategies, reinforcement learning based flexible MIMO, wireless virtual reality (VR)/haptic MIMO and more at every following GLOBECOM till 2019. He received the Best Demo Award from IEEE DySPAN in 2018 for his demo system on OP-map based flexible duplex MIMO system.

He has also worked in new communication paradigm called molecular communications. He has been pioneering the development of molecular communication strategies, including theory and prototyping.

=== Machine learning ===
In 2017, Chae introduced a novel machine learning technique for modeling the molecular MIMO channel and confirmed its effectiveness using numerical studies. He also provided an overview of map-based mmWave channel models, and proposed a concept of how they can be utilized to integrate a hardware testbed/sounder with a software testbed/sounder. He categorized map-based channel parameters and also provided guidelines for hybrid modeling. While focusing his studies on Artificial Intelligence (AI) and Machine Learning (ML) approaches, he addressed the special issues on advances and applications of artificial intelligence and machine learning for wireless communications. In another study, he employed the artificial neural networks technique, and modeled the received signal for a spherical transmitter and a perfectly absorbing receiver. while examining multiuser MIMO communication from an algorithmic perspective, he discussed performance gains, tradeoffs, and practical considerations, and also explored several approaches including non-linear and linear channel-aware precoding in this context.

== Awards and honors ==
- 2003 - Patent Prize, Samsung Electronics
- 2004 - Outstanding Research Engineer, Samsung Electronics
- 2008 - IEEE-VTS Dan. E. Noble Fellowship Award
- 2012 - IEEE ComSoc AP Young Researcher Award
- 2013 - Best Paper Award, IEEE Signal Processing Magazine
- 2014 - Joined RF/Communications Lead User Program (the first in Asia)
- 2014 - Real-Time Full Duplex LTE System Demo at IEEE Globecom
- 2014 - IEIE/IEEE Joint Award for Young IT Engineer of the Year
- 2015 - IEEE INFOCOM Best Demo Award
- 2016 - Yonam Overseas Research Award, LG Yonam Foundation
- 2017 - The Award of Excellence in Leadership of 100 Leading Core Technologies for Korea 2025, National Academy of Engineering of Korea
- 2018 - Best Paper Award, IEEE/KICS Journal of Communications and Networks
- 2018 - IEEE DySPAN Best Demo Paper Award
- 2019 - NAEK Young Engineer Award, National Academy of Engineering of Korea (NAEK)
- 2020 - Distinguished Lecturer (ComSoc), IEEE
- 2020 - IEEE WCNC Best Demo Award
- 2020 - IEEE Fellow for contributions to MIMO design and prototype for emerging communication systems
- 2021 - Elected to the National Academy of Engineering of Korea
- 2021, 2018 - Best Multimedia Awards, IEEE Access
- 2021 - Best Educator Award, Outstanding Achievement Award in Education, Yonsei University (Hall of Fame)
- 2022 - IEEE ICC Best Demo Award
- 2022 - CES Innovation Awards
- 2023 - KICS Haedong Scholar Grand Award
- 2024 - Korean Ministry of Education Award for contributions to academic advancement
- 2024 - Korean Ministry of Science and ICT Award for contributions to 6G research
- 2025 - Fellow, National Academy of Inventors (US)
- 2026 - IEEE ICC Best Paper Award
- 2026 - Best Paper Award, IEEE/KICS Journal of Communications and Networks
- 2026 - IEEE Communications Society Career Award (ComSoc Education Award)
- 2026 - IEEE Communications Society Heinrich Hertz Award

== Bibliography ==
- Gesbert, D., Kountouris, M., Heath, R. W., Chae, C. B., & Salzer, T. (2007). Shifting the MIMO paradigm. IEEE signal processing magazine, 24(5), 36–46.
- Chae, C. B., Tang, T., Heath, R. W., & Cho, S. (2008). MIMO relaying with linear processing for multiuser transmission in fixed relay networks. IEEE Transactions on Signal Processing, 56(2), 727-738.
- Chae, C.-B. Mazzarese, D., Jindal, N., and Heath, R. W. (2008). Coordinated beamforming with limited feedback with limited feedback in the MIMO broadcast channel. IEEE Journal on Selected Areas in Communications, 26(8), 1505–1515.
- Kim, N.-R. and Chae, C.-B. (2013). Novel modulation techniques using isomers as messenger molecules for nano communication networks via diffusion. IEEE Journal on Selected Areas in Communications, 31(12), 847-856
- Yilmaz, H. B., Heren, A. C., Tugcu, T., & Chae, C. B. (2014). Three-dimensional channel characteristics for molecular communications with an absorbing receiver. IEEE Communications Letters, 18(6), 929–932.
- Farsad, N., Yilmaz, H. B., Eckford, A., Chae, C. B., & Guo, W. (2016). A comprehensive survey of recent advancements in molecular communication. IEEE Communications Surveys & Tutorials, 18(3), 1887–1919.
