= Edward Atkin =

British businessman, investor and entrepreneur (born 1944)

Edward Atkin CBE
- Born: 1944 (age 81–82)
- Occupations: Businessman, entrepreneur
- Known for: founder of Avent
- Awards: CBE; IET Achievement Medal

Edward Atkin is a businessman, investor and entrepreneur based in the UK and was CEO of Avent. His company was acquired by Philips in 2006 for £460 million. His company was then renamed Philips AVENT.

According to The Sunday Times Rich List in 2019, Atkin is worth £267 million.

== Career ==
Edward joined his father's company, which was making a range of rubber products, in 1965 and took control after his father's death in 1972. He decided to concentrate on baby products and car mats. Avent was created after the birth of his first child in 1982. Avent went on to become the world's No.1 brand in baby feeding and revolutionised the baby feeding industry, making it one of the most successful businesses in the UK. The Avent factory in Suffolk was shortlisted for the Stirling Prize in 2000. Edward is also the owner of the heritage motoring title, Motor Sport industry.

== Awards ==
He was awarded the IET Achievement Medal (Mensforth Medal) in 2006 and honored by the Queen with a CBE in 2011.

== Philanthropy ==
He established the Atkin Foundation in 2005. The Atkin Foundation supports a wide variety of creative and cultural activities. He was among the top 200 donors listed by Sunday Times in 2017.
