= Robert W. Heath Jr. =

American electrical engineer and professor

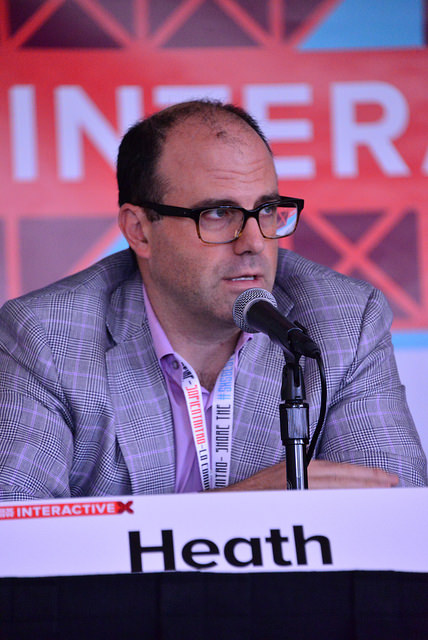
- At SXSW 2015
- Born: 4 December 1973 (age 52); Macon, Georgia, US
- Education: Stanford University; University of Virginia
- Scientific career
- Fields: Wireless communications
- Workplaces: University of California, San Diego
- Doctoral advisor: Arogyaswami Paulraj
- Other academic advisors: G. Giannakis
- Notable students: David Love Chan-Byoung Chae Kaibin Huang
- Website: www.profheath.org

Robert W. Heath Jr. is an American electrical engineer, researcher, educator, wireless technology expert, and a professor in the Department of Electrical and Computer Engineering at the University of California, San Diego. He is also the president and CEO of MIMO Wireless Inc. He was the founding director of the Situation Aware Vehicular Engineering Systems initiative.

== Early life and education ==
Heath received his Ph.D. in electrical engineering from Stanford University in 2002 under the supervision of MIMO pioneer Arogyaswami Paulraj. He completed his M.S. degree in the same field from the University of Virginia in 1997 under the supervision of Georgios B. Giannakis, and his B.S. in electrical engineering from the University of Virginia in 1996.

From 1998 to 2001, Heath was a Senior Member of the Technical Staff and, later, Senior Consultant at Iospan Wireless Inc, San Jose, CA. At Iospan he was part of a team that designed and implemented the physical and link layers of the first commercial MIMO-OFDM communication system. From January 2002 to August 2020, he was with the Department of Electrical and Computer Engineering at The University of Texas at Austin where he was a Cockrell Family Regents Chair in Engineering. He is also President and CEO of MIMO Wireless Inc. and Chief Innovation Officer at Kuma Signals LLC. He was the Director of the Wireless Networking and Communications Group from 2012-2014, where he oversaw an expansion of the center in terms of faculty and students, and an increase in research expenditures to more than $5M per year. At UT he also founded an initiative that brings together transportation and communications called the Situation-Aware Vehicular Engineering Systems (SAVES). He was a Distinguished Professor at the North Carolina State University from October 2020 to December 2023. He is currently a professor at the University of California, San Diego. He is a co-author on more than 600 refereed conference and journal publications. He is also a co-inventor of 64 U.S. patents. He authored a laboratory manual that teaches the principles of wireless communication to undergraduate students and co-authored a book on millimeter wave wireless communication. He authored a book on wireless digital communications and co-authored a comprehensive textbook on MIMO communications He is particularly known for his work on different aspects of MIMO communication systems and millimeter-wave communications.

== Professional career ==
Heath's early work at Stanford advanced the then nascent field of MIMO communication. During his Ph.D. he took a leave of absence to be one of the first employees at Iospan Wireless (earlier known as Gigabit Wireless Inc), where he was part of a small team that created the first practical MIMO-OFDM radio (a predecessor of what we now know as IEEE 802.11n). His work at Iospan resulted in several early patents on critical MIMO technologies.

Heath's work at Iospan led to his discovery that, depending on the wireless propagation conditions, different MIMO configurations, e.g., spatial multiplexing or space-time coding, are preferred. Heath's discovery opened new research avenues to enhance the fundamental understanding of performance limitations in MIMO wireless communication. From his diversity and multiplexing discovery, he also recognized the critical importance of feedback and adaptation in MIMO wireless systems, i.e., to make MIMO wireless communication commercially viable the receiver must inform the transmitter about the best MIMO configuration before communication

At UT Austin, based on his insights into the importance of feedback in MIMO communication, he pioneered MIMO feedback strategies (limited feedback precoding). Heath was able to construct a strategy for which the overhead penalty for feedback was very small (only a few bits of feedback required to configure an entire MIMO transmitter). This allowed practical MIMO wireless communication to achieve data rates and link reliability very close to theoretical expectations by varying the number of spatial multiplexing streams.

== Awards and honors ==
- 2003 – Frontiers in Education Faculty Fellow
- 2011 – Fellow of the IEEE
- 2011 – EURASIP Journal on Wireless Communications and Networking Best Paper Award
- 2012 – IEEE Signal Processing Magazine Best Paper Award
- 2013 – IEEE Signal Processing Society Best Paper Award
- 2014 – EURASIP Journal on Advances in Signal Processing Best Paper Award
- 2014 – Journal of Communications and Networks Best Paper Award
- 2015 – IEEE GLOBECOM Best Paper Award in Communication Theory
- 2016 – IEEE Communications Society Fred W. Ellersick Prize
- 2016 – IEEE Communications Society and Information Theory Society Joint Paper Award
- 2017 – IEEE Marconi Prize Paper Award in Wireless Communications
- 2017 – European Association for Signal Processing (EURASIP) Technical Achievement Award
- 2017 – Fellow of the National Academy of Inventors
- 2017 – IEEE Communication Theory Technical Committee Outstanding Service Award
- 2018 – Journal of Communications and Networks Best Paper Award
- 2018 – IEEE Wireless Communications Technical Committee Recognition Award
- 2018 – 2019 Joe J. King Professional Engineering Achievement Award
- 2019 – IEEE Kiyo Tomiyasu Award
- 2019 – IEEE Communications Society Stephen O. Rice Prize
- 2020 – North Carolina State University Innovator of the Year Award
- 2020 – IEEE Signal Processing Society Donald G. Fink Overview Paper Award
- 2021 – IEEE Vehicular Technology Society James Evans Avant Garde Award
- 2021 – IEEE Vehicular Technology Society Neal Shepherd Memorial Best Propagation Paper Award
- 2025 – IEEE/RSE James Clerk Maxwell Medal
- 2025 - National Academy of Engineering

== Views on 5G ==
Heath is an advocate of moving to millimeter-wave spectrum for the 5G cellular standardization. He recognizes, however, that 5G cellular deployments will likely require significant changes to cellular planning. He has predicted that, due to blockage, millimeter wave cellular will need to be much more densely deployed. Heath also recognizes that 5G cellular will require significant advancements in beamforming protocols, in particular with respect to the speed in which beamforming is trained, to make 5G cellular at millimeter waves viable. He has been a strong advocate of the automotive application for 5G.

== Books ==
- R. Heath, Digital Wireless Communication: Physical Layer Exploration Lab Using the NI USRP, National Technology and Science Press, 2012
- T. S. Rappaport, R. Heath, R. Daniels, J. Murdock, Millimeter Wave Wireless Communications, Prentice Hall, 2015
- Vutha Va, Takayuki Shimizu, Gaurav Bansal, and R. W. Heath Jr., Millimeter Wave Vehicular Communications: A Survey Foundations and Trends in Networking: Vol. 10: No. 1, pp 1–113, 2016.
- R. Heath, Introduction to Wireless Digital Communication: A Signal Processing Perspective, Pearson, 2017
- R. Heath and A. Lozano, Foundations of MIMO Communication, Cambridge University Press, 2018.
