= Yuejie Chi =

Electrical engineer and computer scientist

Yuejie Chi is an electrical engineer and computer scientist who is currently the Sense of Wonder Group Endowed Professor of Electrical and Computer Engineering in AI Systems at Carnegie Mellon University. Her research involves studying non-convex optimization and compressed sensing algorithms used in machine learning and statistical signal processing.

== Education and career ==
Chi graduated from Tsinghua University with a bachelor's degree in electrical engineering in 2007. She went to Princeton University for graduate study in electrical engineering, earning a master's degree in 2009 and completing her Ph.D. in 2012. Her dissertation, Exploitation of Geometry in Signal Processing and Sensing, was supervised by Robert Calderbank.

After completing her Ph.D., she joined the Ohio State University faculty. In 2017 she moved to Carnegie Mellon University as associate professor and the inaugural Robert E. Doherty Early Career Development Professor, later becoming the Sense of Wonder Group Endowed Professor of Electrical and Computer Engineering in AI Systems.

== Recognition ==
Chi was a 2019 recipient of the Presidential Early Career Award for Scientists and Engineers, sponsored through the Office of Naval Research. She was the inaugural winner of the Pierre-Simon Laplace Early Career Technical Achievement Award of the IEEE Signal Processing Society, in 2019, "for contributions to high-dimensional structured signal processing".

She was named as the 2021 Goldsmith Lecturer of the IEEE Information Theory Society, and as a 2022 Distinguished Lecturer of the IEEE Signal Processing Society. She was elected as an IEEE Fellow, in the 2023 class of fellows, "for contributions to statistical signal processing with low-dimensional structures".
