= IEEE Transactions on Green Communications and Networking =

- Discipline: Telecommunication technology
- Language: English
- Edited by: Aylin Yener

Publication details
- History: 2017–present
- Publisher: IEEE Communications Society, IEEE Signal Processing Society, and IEEE Vehicular Technology Society
- Frequency: Quarterly
- Open access: Hybrid
- Impact factor: 4.8 (2022)

Standard abbreviations
- ISO 4: IEEE Trans. Green Commun. Netw.

Indexing
- ISSN: 2473-2400
- LCCN: 2016202925

Links
- Journal homepage; Online access; Online archive

The IEEE Transactions on Green Communications and Networking is a quarterly peer-reviewed scientific journal published jointly by three societies of the IEEE: IEEE Communications Society, IEEE Signal Processing Society, and IEEE Vehicular Technology Society.

== Background ==
The journal covers research on all aspects of green communications and networks, including wired communication, optical communication, and Wireless communications and telecommunication network. It was established in 2017 with Ender Ayanoglu (University of California, Irvine) as the founding editor-in-chief. Since 2022 the editor-in-chief is Aylin Yener (Ohio State University).

== Abstracting and indexing ==
The journal is abstracted and indexed in:

- Current Contents/Engineering, Computing & Technology
- Ei Compendex
- Inspec
- Science Citation Index Expanded
- Scopus

According to the Journal Citation Reports, the journal has a 2022 impact factor of 4.8.

== See also ==
- IEEE Transactions on Communications
- IEEE Transactions on Signal Processing
