= Philips Avent =

Child care product company

- Product type: Baby care
- Current owner: Philips
- Country: United Kingdom
- Introduced: 1984; 42 years ago
- Markets: Worldwide
- Ambassador: Yami Gautam Dhar
- Tagline: "Share the care"
- Website: www.philips.com/avent/

Philips Avent, stylized as Philips AVENT, is a child care brand which manufactures baby bottles, breast pumps, and other baby feeding and health accessories. It is based in Amsterdam, Netherlands.

== History ==
In 1982, Edward Atkin, a young British man, at the birth of his first child, wanted to improve the traditional baby bottles which had several defects when used: the teats were hard and narrow and the container unstable and difficult to fill. He wants to rethink the bottle created years earlier by his father, David Atkin. It creates a wide neck for easy filling and cleaning and adds a soft, flared silicone teat that is tasteless and odorless. This pacifier, presented as equipped with an advanced anti-colic system, marks the beginning of the Avent brand in breastfeeding and bottle feeding.

The name AVENT came from the sub-brand Avent Naturally which was launched by a Company called Cannon Rubber (est.1936). The brand was created in 1984 to launch a new type of baby bottle that was short with a wide neck. Avent was the first baby feeding company to produce teats from odourless and tasteless silicone as well as other patented innovations such as a steam and microwave steriliser and piston-free breast pump.

In 2005, Charterhouse Venture Capital acquired the company, then known as Cannon Avent. In 2006, Dutch company Philips acquired the brand and renamed it Philips Avent.

Philips Avent has won several international awards for its products. Its Smart Baby Bottle won an international Good Design Award for three years running, from 2017 to 2019, while its Advanced Bottle Sterilizer and Dryer won the Good Design Award in 2020.

The Avent manufacturing plant was located in Suffolk, a county in the east of England, however it was closed in 2020 by Philips due to Brexit. Manufacturing is now done outside of the UK. Avent's electric breast pump also won an IF Design Award in 2020.
