= Urbashi Mitra =

American electrical engineer

- Mitra in Los Angeles in 2026
- Education: University of California, Berkeley; Princeton University
- Known for: Electrical Engineering
- Scientific career
- Workplaces: University of Southern California

Urbashi Mitra (born 1966) is an American electrical engineer, the Gordon S. Marshall Chair in Engineering at the University of Southern California, and a professor in the university's Ming Hsieh Department of Electrical and Computer Engineering and (by courtesy) in the Thomas Lord Department of Computer Science. Topics in her research have included wireless communication, underwater acoustic communication, wireless sensor networks, signal processing, and network localization.

== Education and career ==
Mitra was an undergraduate and master's student at the University of California, Berkeley. She majored in electrical engineering & computer science, then graduated with her B.S. in 1987, and received her M.S. in 1989. After a year on the technical staff of Bellcore, she continued her graduate studies at Princeton University. She earned her Ph.D. in 1994 with the dissertation Adaptive Multi-user Receivers supervised by Professor Vincent Poor.

She became an assistant professor at Ohio State University in 1994 and was promoted to associate professor in 2000. In 2001, she moved to Los Angeles to be an associate professor at the University of Southern California, where she then became a full professor in 2005. She was named as Dean's Professor in 2015-2017 and a Gordon S. Marshall Professor in 2017. She has also held visiting positions at Rice University, Stanford University, Delft University of Technology, King's College London, and Imperial College London. One of her research interests is security in the Internet of things, in particular how statistical hardness can be used to increase privacy in wireless systems.

Mitra has held many leadership positions. Most notably, in 2015, she was the founding editor-in-chief of IEEE Transactions on Molecular, Biological and Multi-Scale Communications. She served on the Editorial Board (as Associate Editor and an Area Editor) for IEEE Transactions on Information Theory. She served for 12 years as an elected member of the Board of Governors of the IEEE Information Theory Society. She also served on the Board of Governors of the IEEE Communications Society. She co-chaired international conferences on information theory in 2014 and 2024.

== Recognition ==
1997: Charles E. MacQuigg Award for Outstanding Teaching at the Ohio State University.

2007: IEEE Fellow "for contributions to multiuser wideband digital communication systems".

2012: National Academy of Engineering Gilbreth Lecturer

2016: Fulbright Scholar.

2017: Outstanding Achievement Award from the Women in Communications Engineering Committee of the IEEE Communications Society.

2024: IEEE Information Theory Society's Aaron D. Wyner Distinguished Service Award for outstanding leadership in the information theory community.

2024: Distinguished Lecturer of the IEEE Signal Processing Society.

2025: Graduate commencement speaker at Princeton University's Department of Electrical and Computer Engineering.
