= Chai Keong Toh =

Singaporean computer scientist

Chai Keong Toh FREng
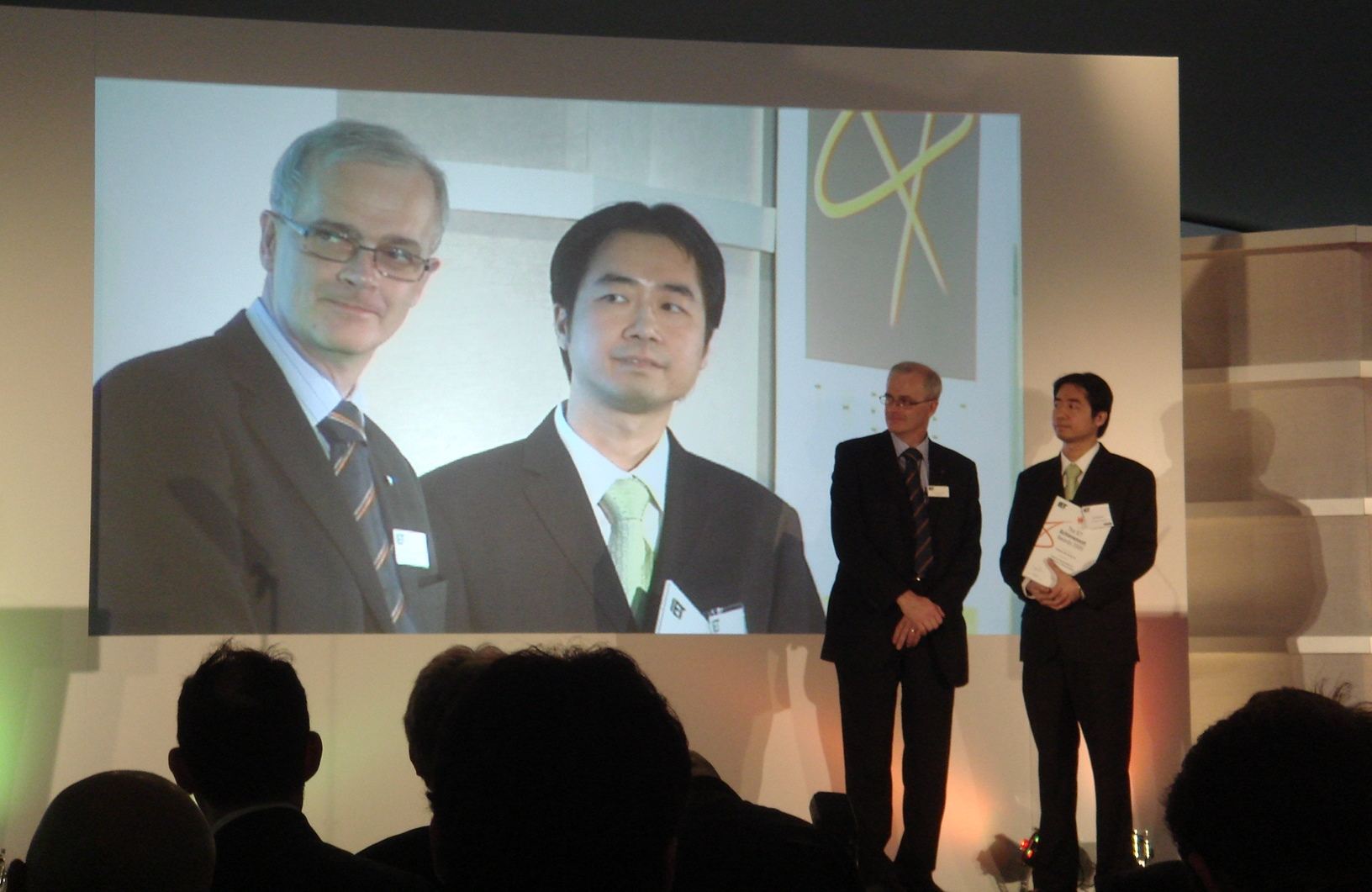
- Toh (on the right) at IET Awards Ceremony in London.
- Born: 1965 (age 60–61); Singapore
- Education: University of Cambridge; University of Manchester
- Known for: Computer networks, mobile computing, ITS, data analytics, IoT and Smart Cities
- Awards: IEEE Kiyo Tomiyasu Award (2005); IET Achievement Medals (2009); IEEE Fellow (2009); AAAS Fellow (2009); IET Fellow (2004); BCS Fellow (2003); FREng (2019)
- Scientific career
- Workplaces: National Tsing Hua University; University of London; University of California Berkeley
- Thesis: Protocol Aspects of Mobile Radio Networks (1996)
- Academic advisors: Andy Harter (examiner); David Wheeler (mentor); Jean Bacon (mentor)
- Website: website

Chai Keong Toh FREng (born 1965) is a Singaporean computer scientist, engineer,and university professor. He is currently a Senior Fellow at the University of California Berkeley, USA. He was formerly Assistant Chief Executive (Engineering & Technology) of Infocomm Development Authority (IDA) Singapore. He has performed research on wireless ad hoc networks, mobile computing, Internet Protocols, and multimedia for over two decades. Toh's current research is focused on Internet-of-Things (IoT), architectures, platforms, and applications behind the development of smart cities.

== Early life ==
Born in Singapore, Toh studied in Singapore Polytechnic and then received his university education in the United Kingdom. He subsequently moved to live and work in the United States. He studied at King's College, Cambridge under a Cambridge Commonwealth Trust Scholarship, and received his Ph.D. in computer science from University of Cambridge, UK in 1996 and his undergraduate EE degrees at the University of Manchester Institute of Science and Technology in 1991.

== Industry, public sector and universities ==
From 2002 to 2004, Toh was the Director of Research, Communication Systems, at TRW Systems Corporation (now Northrop Grumman Inc) in Carson, California. After his PhD in 1996, he joined Hughes Research Laboratories in Malibu, California. At Hughes, he co-led the DARPA TTO DAMAN (Deployable and Adaptive Mobile Ad Hoc Networks) Program. Earlier on, he worked as an engineer at Advanced Logic Research Computers, Archive Corporation, and served on the technology advisory board of Convergence Corporation (acquired by Amazon).

Since 2011, he has been appointed the Tsing Hua Honor Chair Professor of Computer Science (Taiwan). He has also been an Honorary Professor at the University of Hong Kong, China (2004–2009), Honorary Professor at the University of Essex, UK (2013–2015), Honorary Professor at the University of Haute Alsace, FRANCE (2013), and Advisory Professor of Computer Science at Technical University of Valencia, SPAIN. Earlier on, he was a tenured Chair Professor at the University of London (2004–2006) and on the faculty at University of California, Irvine and at Georgia Institute of Technology.

In 2014, Toh was appointed as Assistant Chief Executive (Engineering And Technology), of Infocomm Development Authority of Singapore (IDA) in 2014. He was concurrently the Chief Engineering & Technology Officer (CETO) of IDA. He left Infocomm Media Development Authority (formerly known as IDA) and joined Singapore Power Telecom Ltd as VP and CTO. Subsequently, he returned to United States.

== Inventions and awards ==
Toh was as an IEEE Expert Lecturer of the IEEE Communications Society from 2002 to 2003. He is also listed among the top 20 authors in Wireless/Mobile Networks in the world by THOMSON Essential Science Indicators (ESI) for technical papers published from 1995 to 2005. His GoogleScholar.com and Harzing.com Publish or Perish total citation exceeds 20,000.

Toh also invented Associativity-Based Routing and Wireless Mobile Ad Hoc Networks (Wi-Fi Ad-Hoc Mode). His first successful implementation of Wi-Fi Ad-Hoc Mode was achieved in 1998 when he established a working wireless ad hoc network in Georgia, USA. In 2009, he challenged the "always-on" Internet model, claiming that the resulting energy burden globally is not sustainable. Instead, he advocated re-designing existing Internet architecture, routers, switches, servers and data centers. In 2011, he invented a method to identify witnesses during car accidents using a distributed information dissemination and data fusion approach. In 2009, he introduced "signs that talk", transforming traffic signs into wireless digital forms

He is an elected Fellow of the IEEE (FIEEE), a Fellow of the American Association for the Advancement of Science (FAAAS), Fellow of the British Computer Society (FBCS), Fellow of IEE (Institution of Electrical Engineers), Fellow of HKIE Hong Kong Institution of Engineers, Fellow of IITP (Institute of IT Professionals - formerly known as New Zealand Computer Society), Fellow of Cambridge Commonwealth Society, and Life Fellow of the Cambridge Philosophical Society, UK. He is a Chartered Engineer (UK) and Chartered IT Professional (CITP).

In 2005, IEEE awarded him the IEEE Institution Kiyo Tomiyasu Technical Field Award, with the citation – "for pioneering contributions to communication protocols in ad hoc mobile wireless networks". He has undertaken research in wireless ad hoc networks since 1993 (while at Cambridge University) and had written two sole-authored pioneering books: "Wireless ATM & Ad Hoc Networks" (Kluwer, 1997) and "Ad Hoc Mobile Wireless Networks" (Prentice Hall Best Seller, 2001). In 2009, IET awarded him the John Ambrose Fleming Medal (IET Achievement Medals) in London. In 2019, he was elected to the Royal Academy of Engineering, UK. In 2022, he received the IET Outstanding Editor-in-Chief Award from IET UK.

== Bibliography ==
=== Books ===
- Toh, Chai Keong (2001). Ad Hoc Mobile Wireless Networks: Protocols and Systems - Prentice Hall Best Seller 2002. Pearson Education. ISBN 9780132442046. - also published in Japan (Japanese translation) and India (paperback edition)
- Toh, Chai Keong (1997). Wireless ATM and Ad Hoc Networks: Protocols and Architectures. Kluwer Academic Publishers. ISBN 978-0792398226.
- Toh, Chai Keong (1996). Protocol Aspects of Mobile Radio Networks. University of Cambridge.

=== Noted papers/patents ===
- Royer, E.M.; Chai Keong Toh (1999). "A review of current routing protocols for ad hoc mobile wireless networks". IEEE Personal Communications. 6 (2): 46. doi:10.1109/98.760423.
- Toh, Chai Keong (1996). US Patent: A Routing Method for Ad Hoc Mobile Networks. US Patent Office.
- Toh, Chai Keong (2011). US Patent: Method and system for disseminating witness information in multi-hop broadcast car networks. US Patent Office.

=== Keynotes and media ===
- Creating A Smarter Country, "Creating A Smarter Country" - Malaysia Business Radio BFM89.9 (2015), Malaysia
- From Information Science to Data Science and Smart Nation, 28 June 2016, PACIS 2015, Singapore
- "Opening Address: 5G & Smart Nation", Next Gen Mobile Networks Alliance NGMN 2015, Singapore
- Future of Wireless (PDF), WirelessDays Conference, November 2013, Spain
- Future Research Challenges for Vehicular Communication Networks (PDF), IEEE WAVE Conference, 2009, Shanghai, China
- "Future Research Challenges for Intelligent Transportation Networks", IFIP Networks Conference, 2008, Singapore
- Keynote: Future Research Challenges for Ad Hoc Mobile Networks (PDF), IEEE IPCCC Conference (2003), Arizona, USA
- Keynote: Future Research Challenges for Ad Hoc Mobile Wireless Networks (PDF), IEEE Expert Lectures, 2002. Norway/Sweden/Finland.

Awards
Preceded by B.K. Syngal	IET Ambrose Fleming Medal (IET Achievement Medals); 2009	Succeeded by Vincent Poor, FRS
Preceded by David B. Fogel	IEEE Kiyo Tomiyasu Award; 2005	Succeeded by Muhammad A. Alam
