= Robert Calderbank =

American mathematician

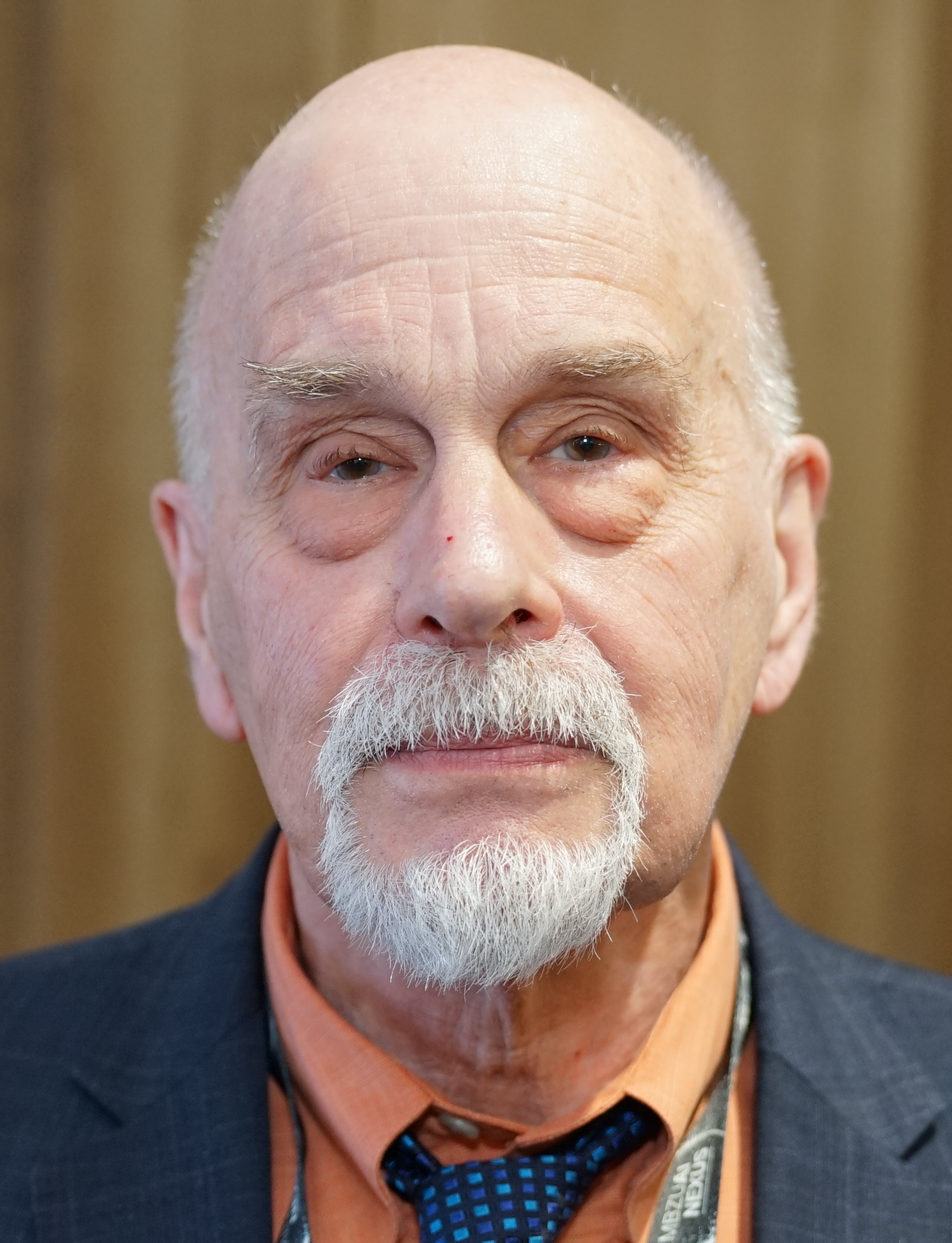
- Calderbank in 2026
- Born: 28 December 1954 (age 71)
- Education: University of Warwick; University of Oxford; Caltech
- Known for: CSS code Space-time code Coding Theory
- Awards: IEEE Hamming Medal (2013); IEEE Shannon Award (2015)
- Scientific career
- Fields: Applied and Computational Mathematics
- Workplaces: Duke University; Princeton University
- Thesis: Algebraic coding theory (1980)
- Doctoral advisor: Marshall Hall
- Doctoral students: Vaneet Aggarwal; Yuejie Chi

Robert Calderbank (born 28 December 1954) is a professor of computer science, electrical engineering, and mathematics and director of the Information Initiative at Duke University. He received a BSc from Warwick University in 1975, an MSc from Oxford in 1976, and a PhD from Caltech in 1980, all in mathematics. He joined Bell Labs in 1980, and retired from AT&T Labs in 2003 as Vice President for Research and Internet and network systems. He then went to Princeton as a professor of Electrical Engineering, Mathematics and Applied and Computational Mathematics, before moving to Duke in 2010 to become Dean of Natural Sciences.

His contributions to coding and information theory won the IEEE Information Theory Society Paper Award in 1995 and 1999.

He was elected as a member into the US National Academy of Engineering in 2005 for leadership in communications research, from advances in algebraic coding theory to signal processing for wire-line and wireless modems. He also became a fellow of the American Mathematical Society in 2012.

Calderbank won the 2013 IEEE Richard W. Hamming Medal and the 2015 Claude E. Shannon Award.

He was named a SIAM Fellow in the 2021 class of fellows, "for deep contributions to information theory".

He is married to Ingrid Daubechies.
