= Leslie Rusch =

American and Canadian electrical engineer

Leslie Ann Rusch
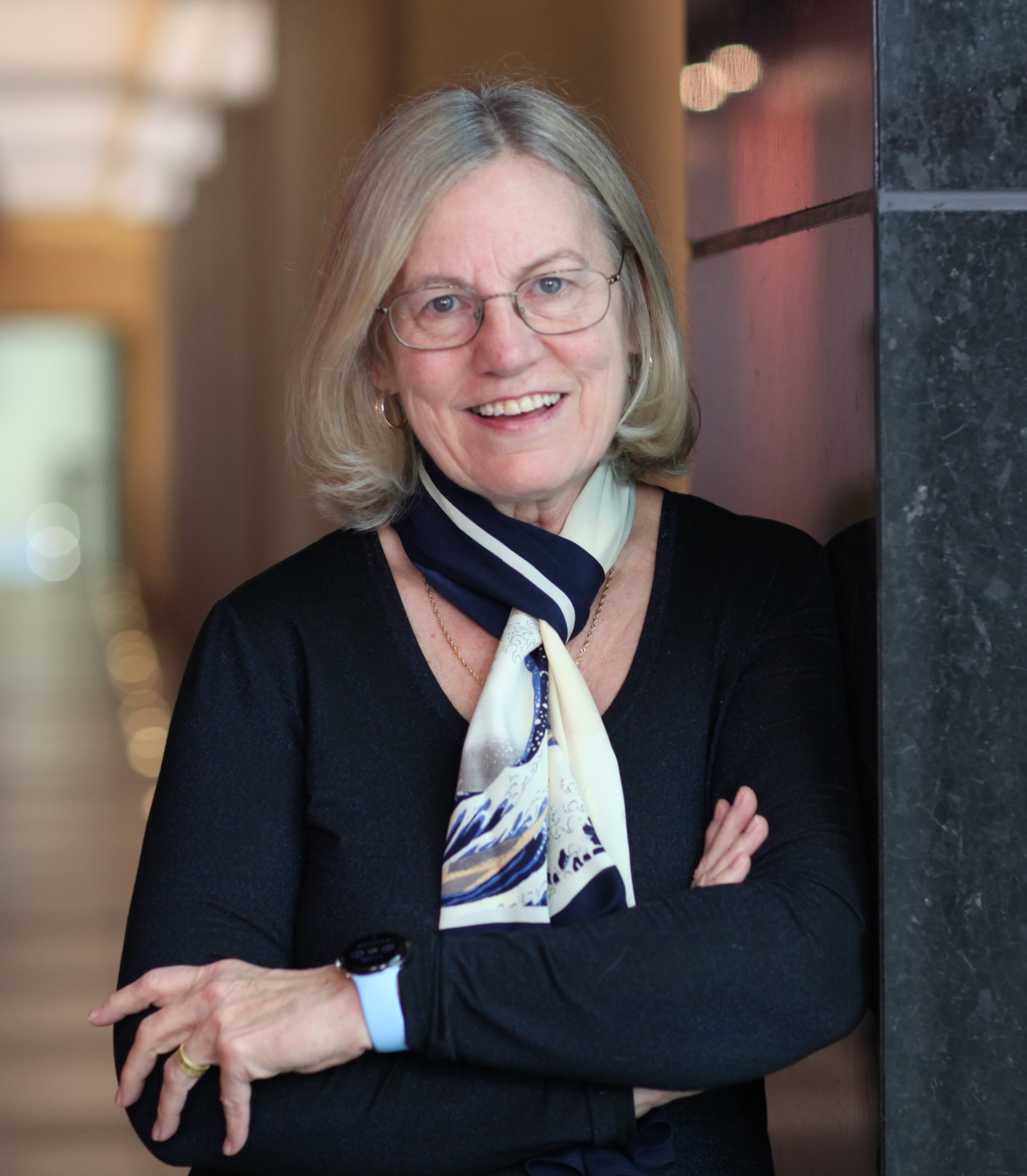
- Education: Princeton University (M.A., Ph.D.); California Institute of Technology (B.S.E.E.)
- Awards: 2017 IEEE Canada R. A. Fessenden Award; 2017 Optica Fellow; 2013 IEEE Canada J. M. Ham Outstanding Engineering Educator Award; 2010 IEEE Fellow
- Scientific career
- Doctoral advisor: Vincent Poor

Leslie Ann Rusch (born 1958) is an American and Canadian electrical engineer whose research interests include optical communication, edge computing, spread spectrum techniques, flexible antenna arrays, and wireless brain implants. She is a professor of electrical and computer engineering at the Université Laval in Quebec City, where she holds a tier 1 Canada Research Chair in Communications Systems Enabling the Cloud and the NSERC/Huawei Industrial Research Chair in Fibre Optic Communications Systems.

== Education ==
Rusch is a graduate of Schaumburg High School in Illinois. She majored in electrical engineering at the California Institute of Technology, graduating in 1980. After working for the US Department of Defense from 1980 to 1990, she returned to graduate study at Princeton University, where she earned a master's degree in 1992 and completed her PhD in 1994. Her dissertation, Interference Suppression in Spread Spectrum Code Division Multiple Access, was supervised by Vincent Poor.

== Recognition ==
Rusch was named an IEEE Fellow in 2010, "for contributions in optical and wireless communications systems". She was the 2013 recipient of the IEEE Canada J. M. Ham Outstanding Engineering Educator Award, given "for excellence in graduate supervision". In 2017, IEEE Canada gave her their R. A. Fessenden Award, "for contributions to communications systems in optical & wireless technology importance". She became an Optica Fellow in 2017, "for research in optical communications including code division multiple access technologies, ultrawide band signal generation, transient gain effects in optical amplifiers, and exploitation of orbital angular momentum in fiber communications".

She was given her Canada Research Chair in 2017; it was renewed in 2022.
