= Aylin Yener =

Turkish engineer

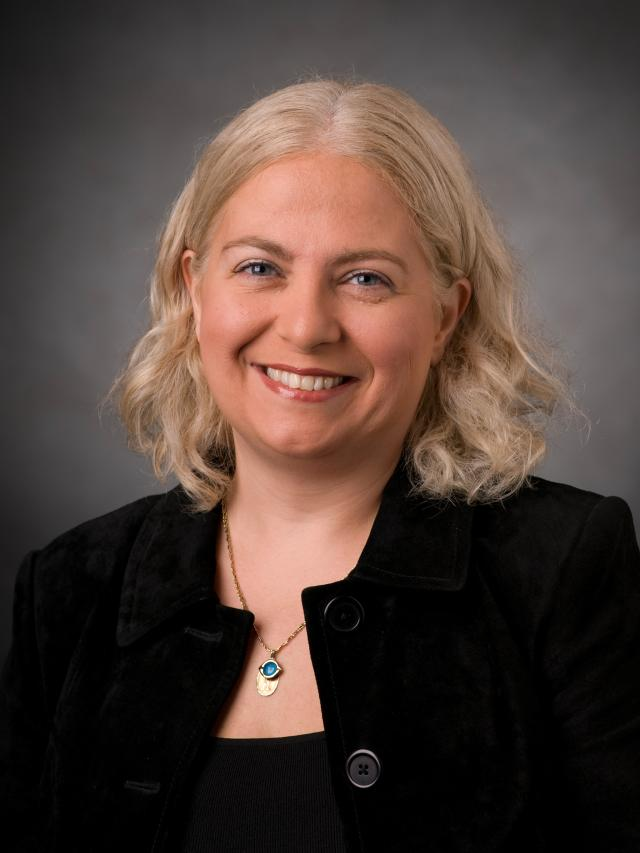
- Aylin Yener in 2020
- Education: Bogazici University Bs. (EE and Physics); Rutgers University (MS, PhD)
- Known for: Contributions to information theory and its applications in digital communications
- Awards: IEEE Communications Society Communication Theory Technical Achievement Award (2020) IEEE Communications Society Best Tutorial Paper Award (2019) IEEE Women In Communications Engineering Outstanding Achievement Award (2018) IEEE Communications Society Marconi Prize Paper Award (2014) Best Paper Award, Communication Theory, IEEE International Conference on Communications (2010) National Science Foundation CAREER Award (2003) Penn State Engineering Alumni Society (PSEAS) Premier Research Award (2014) Leonard A. Doggett Award for Outstanding Writing in Electrical Engineering, Penn State (2014) Penn State Engineering Alumni Society (PSEAS) Outstanding Research Award (2010) DARPA Young Investigator Team Award for ITMANET Program (2006) Fellow of IEEE for contributions to wireless communication theory and wireless information security
- Scientific career
- Fields: 6G networked communications, sensing, computation and learning Artificial Intelligence and Machine Learning; Wireless Communications; Information Theory; Security and Privacy; Optimization
- Institutions: The Ohio State University
- Doctoral advisor: Roy D. Yates
- Doctoral students: Current Jiayu Mao Xue Zheng Emrecan Kutay Truman Welling Alumni Shiyang Leng Abdelrahman Ibrahim Ahmed A. Zewail Mohamed Nafea Burak Varan Basak Guler Kaya Tutuncuoglu Ye Tian Min Li Ertugrul Necdet Ciftcioglu Xiang He Min Chen Ender Tekin Kyounghwan Lee Changyoon Oh Semih Serbetli
- Website: https://ece.osu.edu/people/yener.5

Aylin Yener holds the Roy and Lois Chope Chair in engineering at Ohio State University, and Editor-in-Chief of the IEEE Transactions on Green Communications and Networking. She also serves as the IEEE Division IX Director, which includes 7 IEEE societies: Aerospace and Electronic Systems Society, Geoscience and Remote Sensing Society, Information Theory Society, Intelligent Transportation Systems Society, Oceanic Engineering Society, Signal Processing Society, Vehicular Technology Society. She is a Professor of Electrical and Computer Engineering, Integrated Systems Engineering, and Computer Science and Engineering, as well as an Affiliated Faculty member at the Sustainability Institute and the Translational Data Analytics Institute, all at Ohio State University.

== Education ==
Yener received her dual B.Sc degrees (1991) in Electrical and Electronics Engineering and Physics from Boğaziçi University, Istanbul, Turkey. She carried out her graduate career at Rutgers University, New Brunswick, NJ and received her M.S. in 1994 and Ph.D. in 2000 in Electrical and Computer Engineering while working in the Wireless Information Network Laboratory (WINLAB).

In 2001, Yener began her academic career as a P.C. Rossin Endowed Assistant Professor at Lehigh University. In 2002, she joined Pennsylvania State University in University Park, Pennsylvania. She became a full professor by 2010 and was named a Fellow of the Institute of Electrical and Electronics Engineers (IEEE) in 2015 for her contributions to wireless communication theory and wireless information security. Yener was named Dean's Fellow in 2017 and made the Clarivate Analytics Highly Cited Researchers list later the same year. Yener was honored as a Pennsylvania State University Distinguished Professor in 2019.

In 2020, Yener accepted a faculty position at Ohio State University becoming the Electrical Engineering Department's first chaired female professor.

== Research interest ==
Yener is interested in fundamental performance limits of networked systems, communications and information theory. The applications of these fields include but not limited to information theoretic physical layer security, energy harvesting communication networks, and caching systems. She runs the INSPIRE Lab (Information and Networked Systems Powered by Innovation and Research in Engineering) at Ohio State University.

== Awards ==
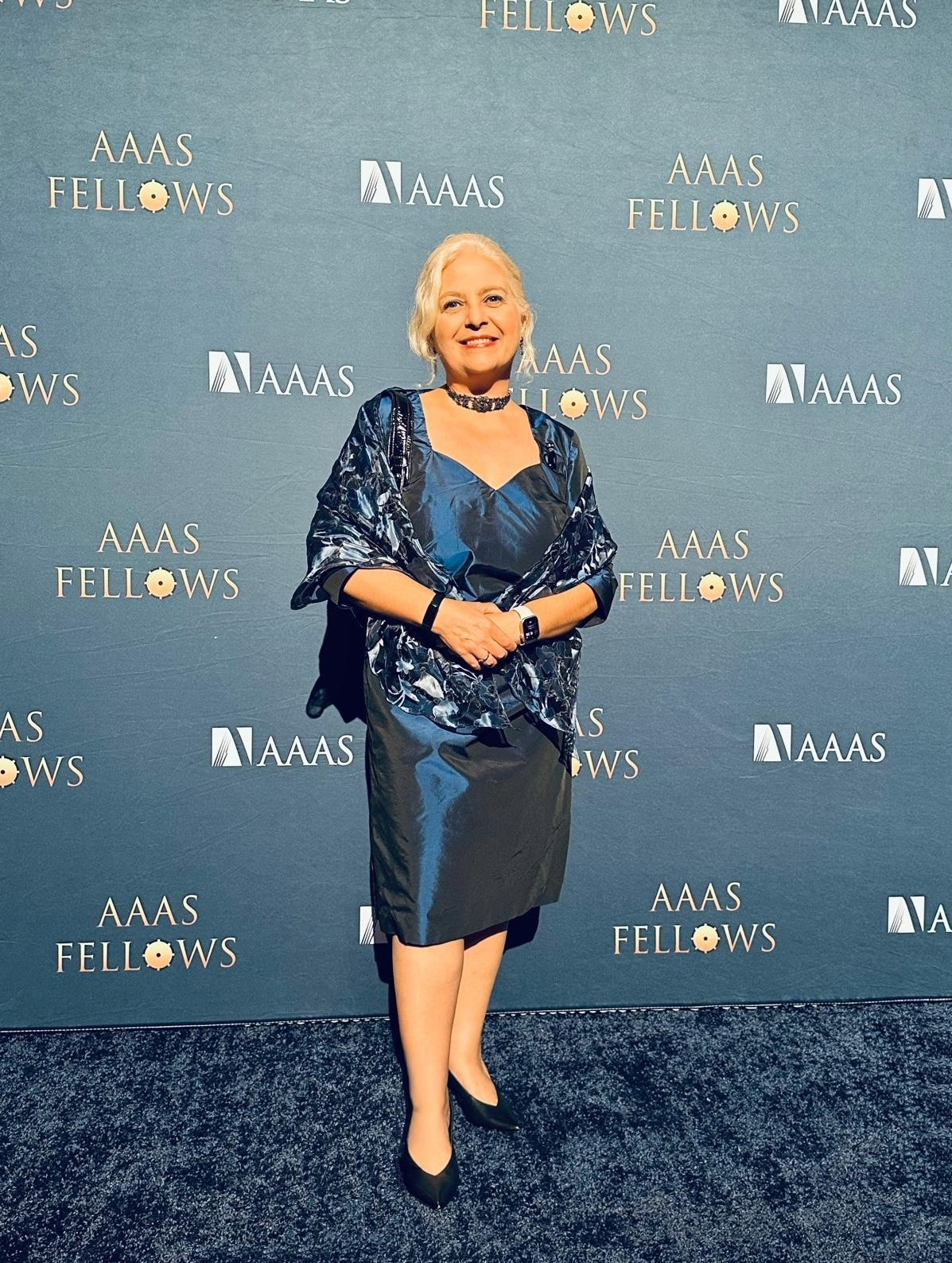
Picture of Prof. Yener at the AAAS event.

- IEEE Joy Thomas Tutorial Paper Award (2025),
- American Association for the Advancement of Science (AAAS) Fellow (2023),
- IEEE Information Theory Society President (2020),
- IEEE Information Theory Society Vice President (2019),
- IEEE Guglielmo Marconi Best Paper Award (2014),
- Defense Advanced Research Project Agency (DARPA) grant, "Rethinking Mobile Ad Hoc Networks: A Non-Equilibrium Information Theory" (2007).
