= IEEE Transactions on Signal Processing =

- Discipline: Signal processing
- Language: English
- Edited by: Zhi Tian

Publication details
- Former names: IRE Transactions on Audio; IEEE Transactions on Audio and Electroacoustics; IEEE Transactions on Acoustics, Speech, and Signal Processing
- History: 1953–present
- Publisher: Institute of Electrical and Electronics Engineers
- Frequency: Biweekly
- Impact factor: 5.8 (2024)

Standard abbreviations
- ISO 4: IEEE Trans. Signal Process.

Indexing
- CODEN: ITPRED
- ISSN: 1053-587X
- LCCN: 91642053
- OCLC no.: 464907408

Links
- Journal homepage; Online access

The IEEE Transactions on Signal Processing is a biweekly peer-reviewed scientific journal published by the Institute of Electrical and Electronics Engineers covering research on signal processing. It was established in 1953 as the IRE Transactions on Audio, renamed to IEEE Transactions on Audio and Electroacoustics in 1966 and to IEEE Transactions on Acoustics, Speech, and Signal Processing in 1974, before obtaining its current name in 1992. The journal is abstracted and indexed in MEDLINE/PubMed and the Science Citation Index Expanded. According to the Journal Citation Reports, the journal has a 2024 impact factor of 5.8. The editor-in-chief is Wing-Kin (Ken) Ma (Chinese University of Hong Kong).

== See also ==
- IEEE Transactions on Green Communications and Networking
