= IEEE Transactions on Communications =

- Discipline: Telecommunication technology
- Language: English
- Edited by: George K. Karagiannidis

Publication details
- History: 1972–present
- Publisher: IEEE Communications Society
- Frequency: Monthly
- Impact factor: 8.3 (2022)

Standard abbreviations
- ISO 4: IEEE Trans. Commun.

Indexing
- CODEN: IECMBT
- ISSN: 0090-6778 (print); 1558-0857 (web)
- LCCN: 73642335
- OCLC no.: 6063510

Links
- Journal homepage; Online access

IEEE Transactions on Communications is a monthly peer-reviewed scientific journal published by the IEEE Communications Society that focuses on all aspects of telecommunication technology, including telephone, telegraphy, facsimile, and point-to-point television by electromagnetic propagation. The editor-in-chief is George K. Karagiannidis (Aristotle University of Thessaloniki). According to the Journal Citation Reports, the journal has a 2022 impact factor of 8.3.

== History ==
The journal traces back to the establishment of the Transactions of the American Institute of Electrical Engineers in 1884. The journal has gone through several name changes and splits over the years.

- 1884–1951: Transactions of the American Institute of Electrical Engineers
- 1952–1963: Transactions of the American Institute of Electrical Engineers, Part I: Communication and Electronics
- 1953–1955: Transactions of the IRE Professional Group on Communications Systems
- 1956–1962: IRE Transactions on Communications Systems
- 1963–1964: IEEE Transactions on Communications Systems
- 1964: IEEE Transactions on Communication and Electronics
- 1964–1971: IEEE Transactions on Communication Technology
- 1972–present: IEEE Transactions on Communications

== See also ==
- IEEE Transactions on Green Communications and Networking
