= Student =

Person acquiring knowledge

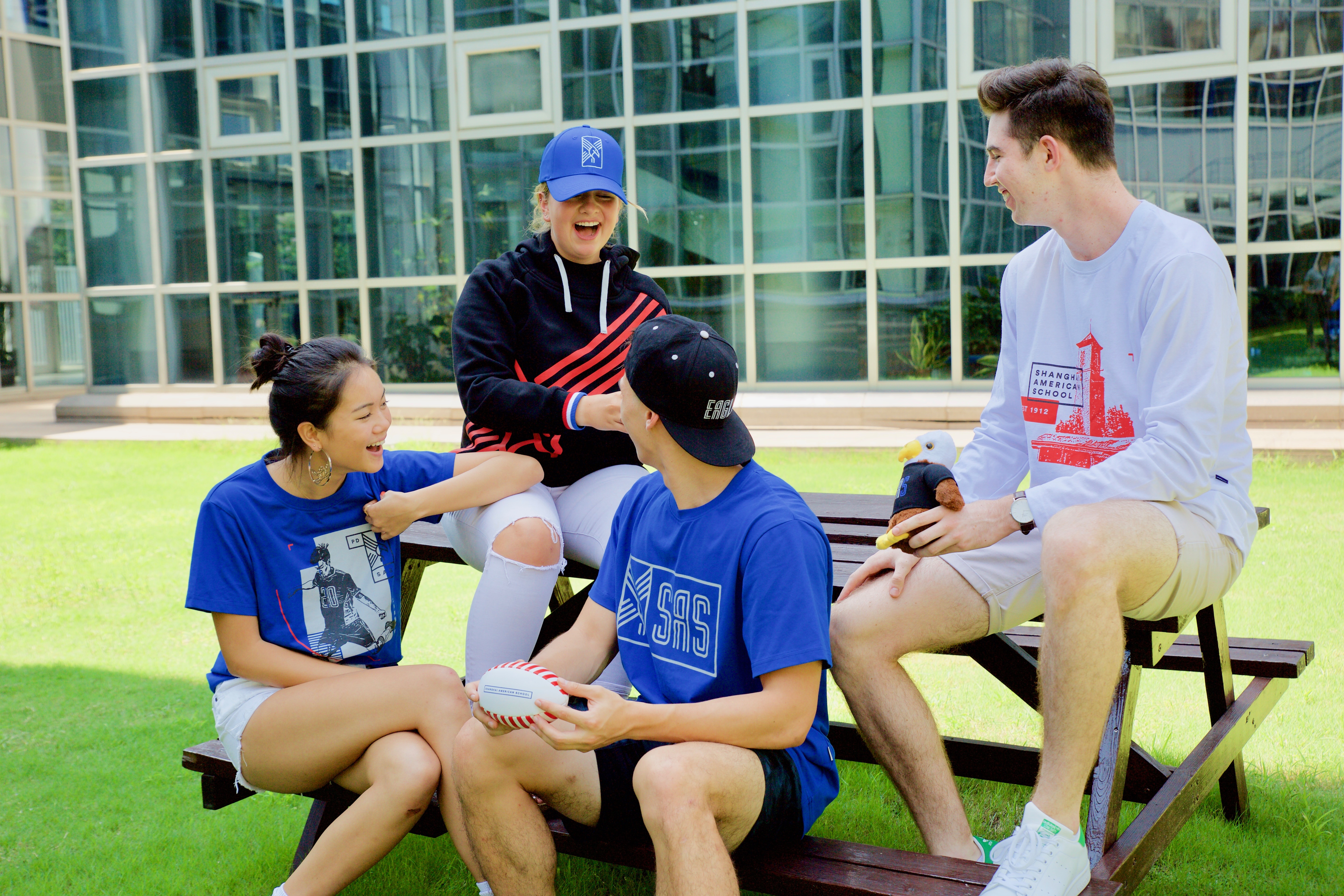
Students of different nationalities at an international school in Shanghai, China, 2017. The school does not have a school uniform.

A student is a person enrolled in a school or other educational institution, or more generally, a person who takes a special interest in a subject.

In the United Kingdom and most commonwealth countries, a "student" attends a college or university; those in primary or secondary schools are "pupils".

== Africa ==
=== Nigeria ===
In Nigeria, education is classified into four systems known as a 6-3-3-4 system of education. It implies six years in primary school, three years in junior secondary, three years in senior secondary and four years in the university. However, the number of years to be spent in university is mostly determined by the course of study. Some courses have longer study lengths than others. Those in primary school are often referred to as pupils. Those in university, as well as those in secondary school, are referred to as students.

The Nigerian system of education also has other recognized categories like the polytechnics and colleges of education. Colleges are more for teaching students how to become teachers, while polytechnics teach students about engineering, industrialization and economics.

=== South Africa ===
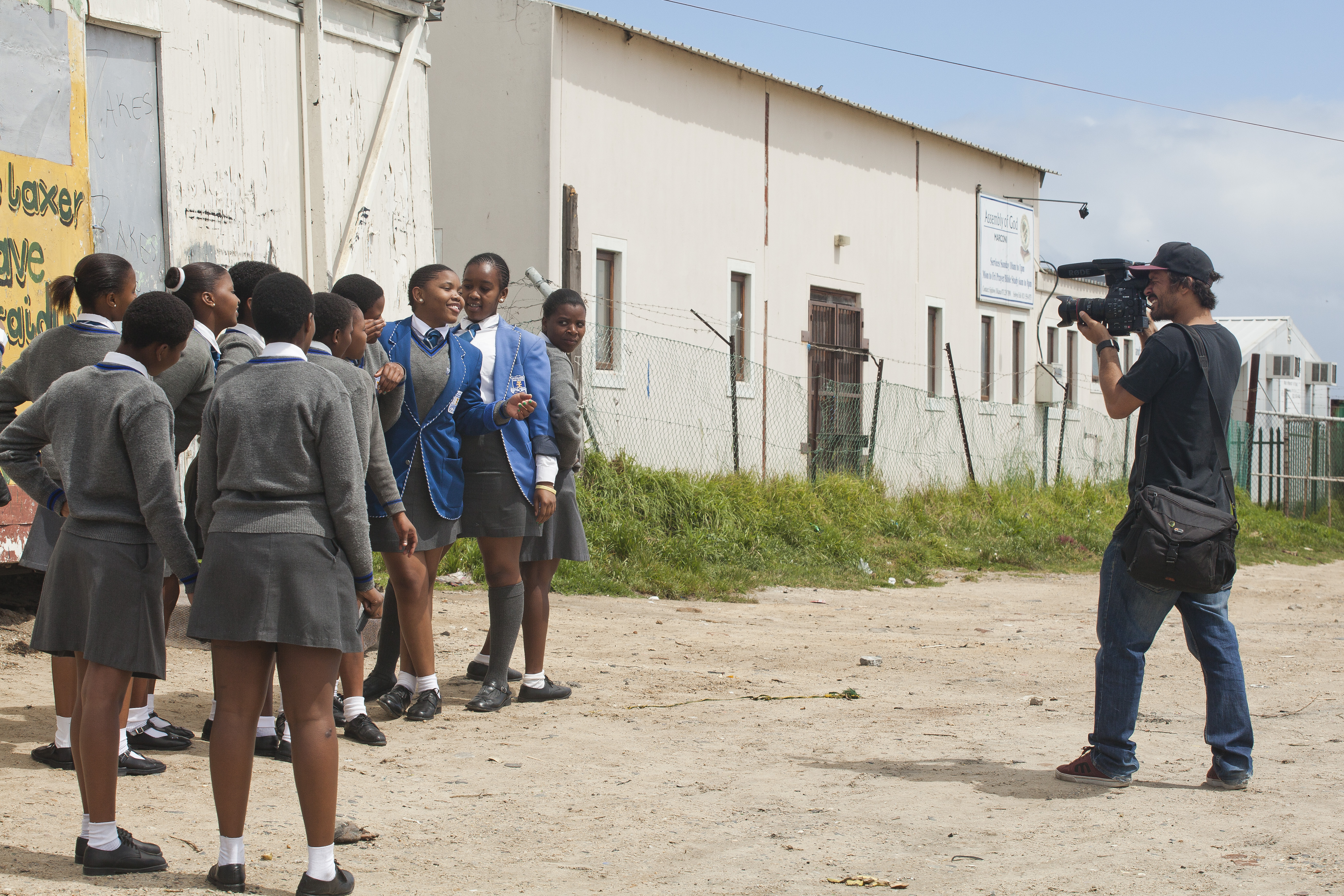
A group of high school girls of South Africa getting photographed

In South Africa, education is divided into four grade groups: the Foundation Phase (grades 0–3), the Intermediate Phase (grades 4–6), the Senior Phase (grades 7–9), and the Further Education and Training or FET Phase (grades 10–12).

== Asia ==
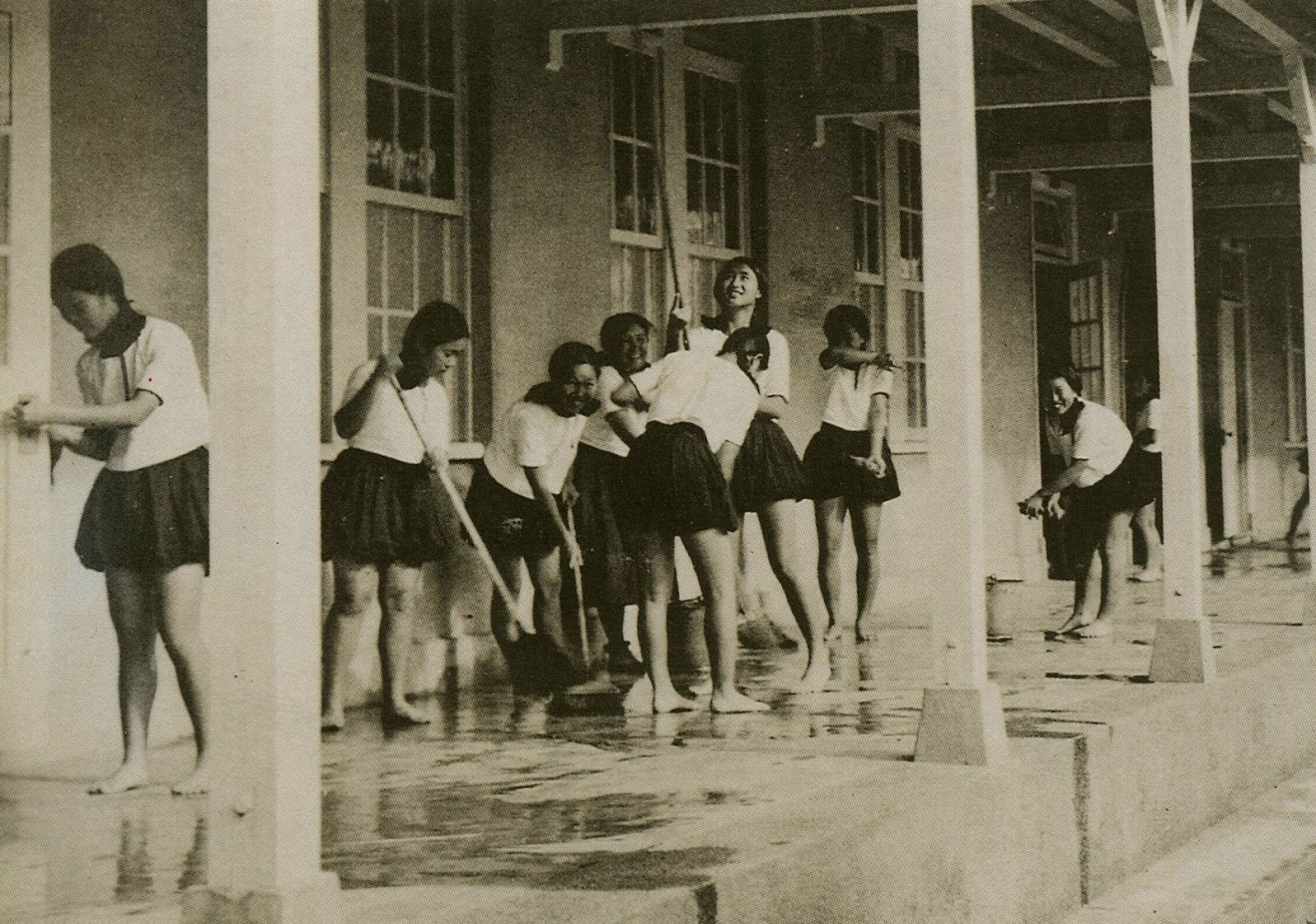
Taiwanese schoolgirls during Japanese rule, 1927

=== Singapore ===
Six years of primary school education in Singapore are compulsory.

- Primary School (Primary 1 to 6)

Primary 1 to 3 (aged 7–9 respectively, Lower primary) Primary 4 to 6 (aged 10–12 respectively, Upper primary)

- Secondary School (Secondary 1 to 4 or 5)

Sec 1s are 13, and Sec 4s are 16. Express Students take secondary school from Sec 1 to 4, and Normal Acad and Technical will take secondary school from Sec 1 to 5.

- Junior College (Junior College 1 to 2 – Optional) OR Polytechnic (3 years – Optional)

There are also schools which have the integrated program, such as River Valley High School (Singapore), which means they stay in the same school from Secondary 1 to Junior College 2, without having to take the "O" level examinations which most students take at the end of secondary school.

International schools are subject to overseas curriculums, such as the British, American, Canadian or Australian Boards.

=== Bangladesh ===
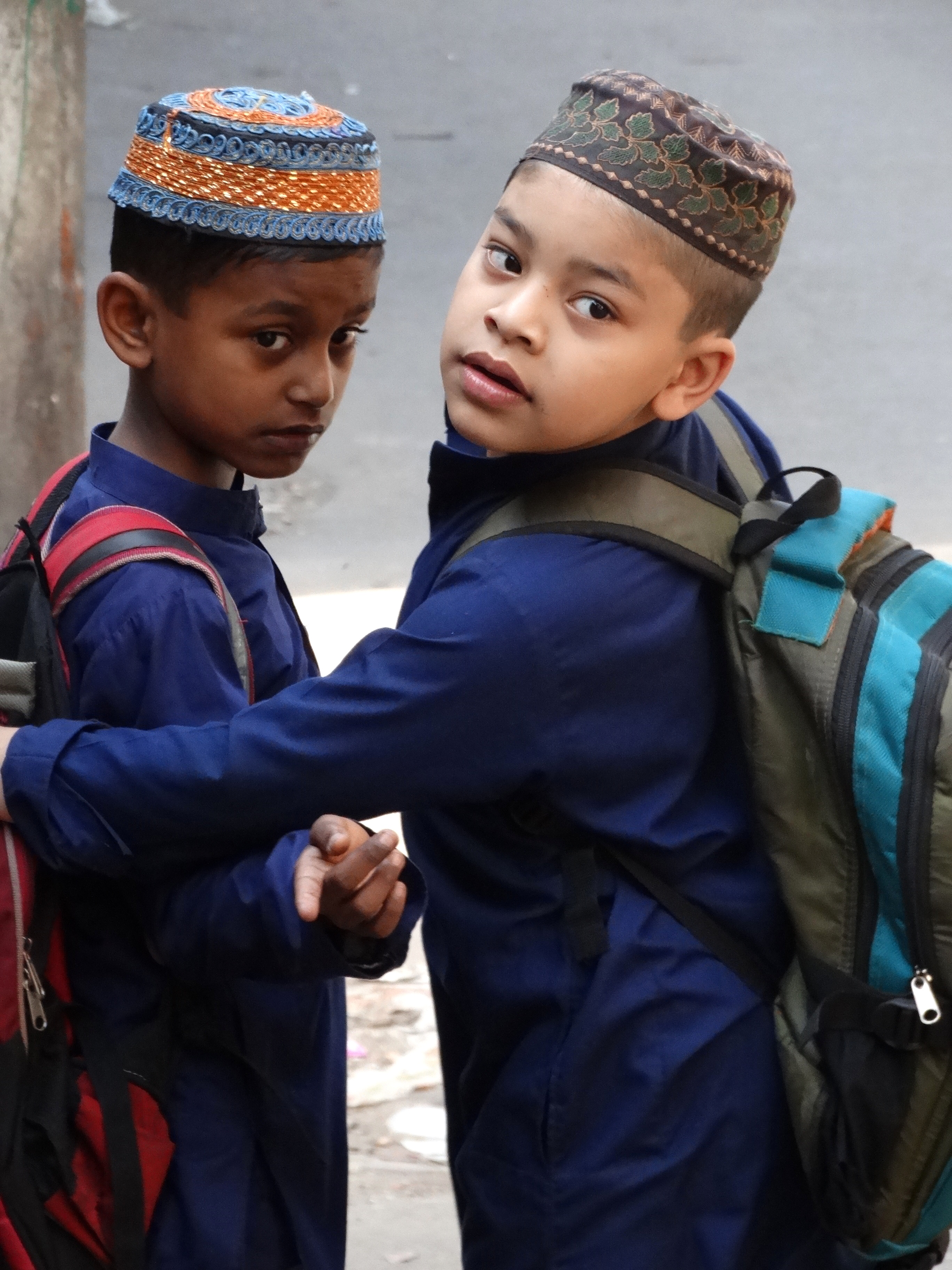
Students in Chittagong

Primary education is compulsory in Bangladesh for children aged six to ten years through a short five year primary cycle defined as basic education, (grades 1- 5). Sending children to work instead of school is a crime, however. Because of the socio-economic state of Bangladesh, child labour is sometimes legal, but the Primary Education Act of 1990 says that the student guardians must ensure that the child does not participate in occupations that would prevent them from getting a primary education.

Education system of Bangladesh
| Educational Level | Grade | Age | School Years |
|---|---|---|---|
| Primary | 1 to 5 | 6 to 10 | 5 |
| Junior Secondary | 6 to 8 | 11 to 13 | 3 |
| Secondary | 9 to 10 | 14 to 15 | 2 |
| Higher Secondary | 11 to 12 | 16 to 17 | 2 |

=== Brunei ===
Education is free in Brunei, with mainly two types of educational institutions: public, and private institutions. In 2009, Brunei introduced the GenNEXT education program. The education system has been undergone by the prospective students leading to higher qualifications, such as bachelor's degree.

This is the list of the education sectors in Brunei:

- Primary School (Year 1 to 6)
- Secondary School (Year 7 to 11)
- High School [or also known as the Sixth Form Centers] (Year 12 to 13)
- Colleges (Pre-University to Diploma)
- University Level (Undergraduate, Postgraduate and Professional)

=== Cambodia ===
Education in Cambodia is free for all students who study in Primary School, Secondary School or High School.

- Primary School (Grade 1 to 6)
- Secondary School (Grade 7 to 9)
- High School (Grade 10 to 12)
- College (Year 1 to 3)
- University (Year 1 to 4 or 5)

After basic education, students can opt to take a bachelor's (undergraduate) degree at a higher education institution (i.e. a college or university), which normally lasts for four years, though the length of some courses may be longer or shorter depending on the institution.

=== India ===
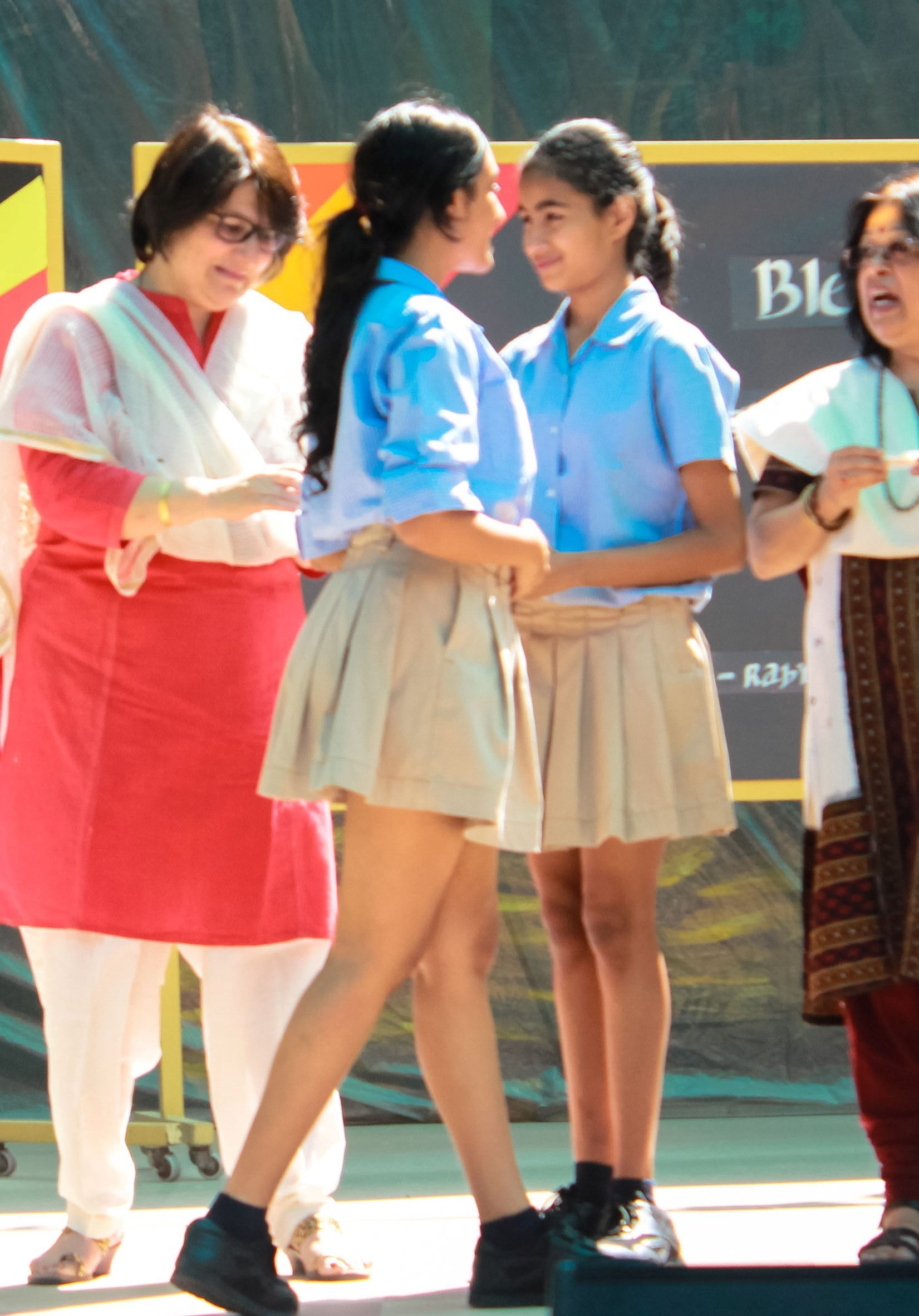
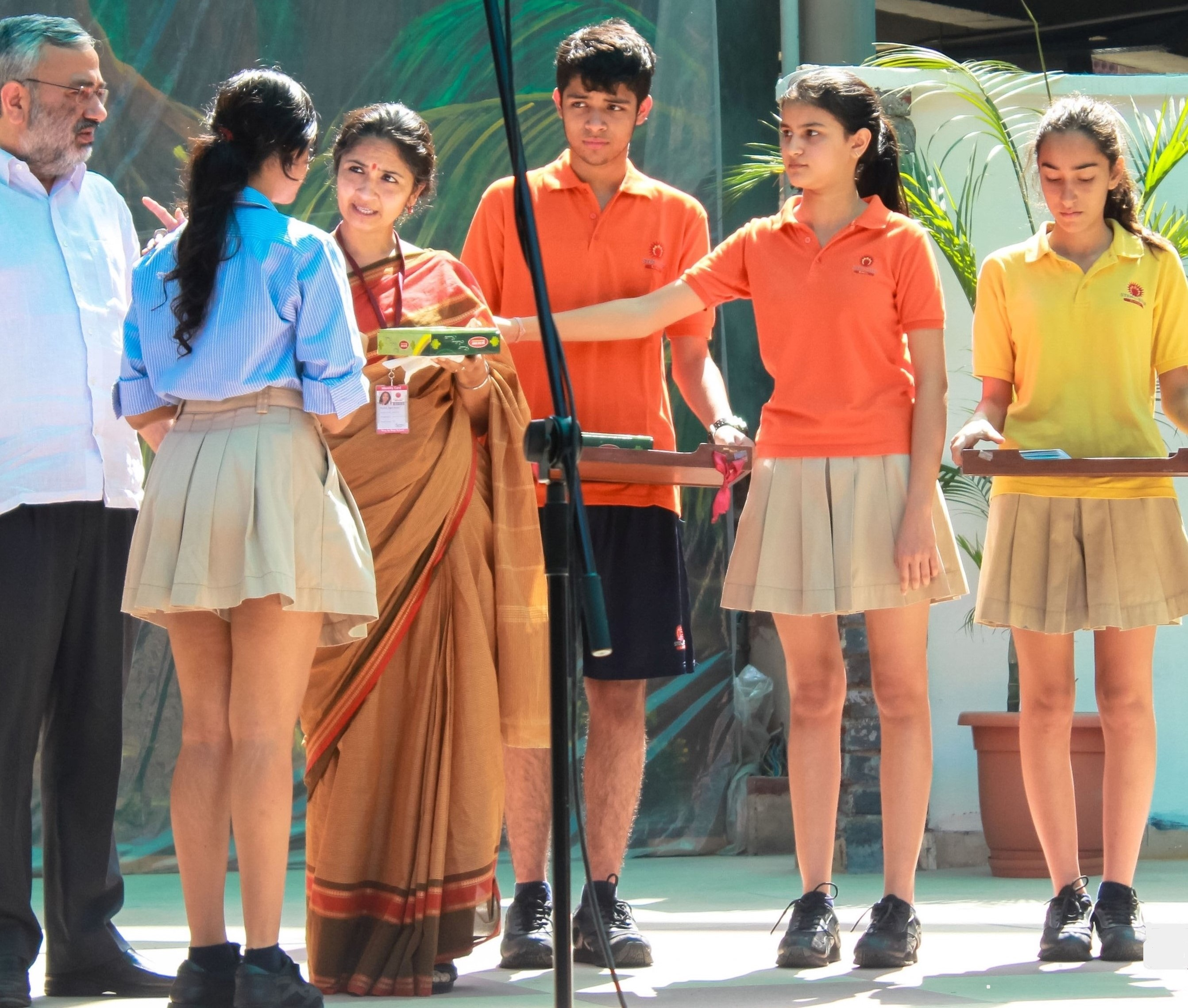
Indian school students in their school uniform

In India school is categorized in these stages: Pre-primary (Nursery, Lower Kindergarten or LKG, Upper Kindergarten or UKG), Primary (Class 1–5), Middle Stage (5–7), Secondary (8–10) and Senior Secondary (11–12). For undergraduate it takes 3 years and sometimes 4.

=== Nepal ===
In Nepal, 12-year school is categorised in four stages: Primary school (Grade 1 to Grade 5), Upper Primary school (Grade 6 to Grade 8), Secondary school (Grade 9 to 10), and Upper Primary school (Grade 11 to Grade 12). For college it averages three to four years for a bachelor's degree and one to two years for a master's degree.

=== Pakistan ===
In Pakistan, 12-year school is categorized in three stages: Primary school, Secondary school and Upper Secondary school. It takes five years for a student to graduate from Primary school, five years for Secondary school, and five years for Higher Secondary school (also called College). Most bachelor's degrees span over four years, followed by a two years master's degree.

=== Philippines ===
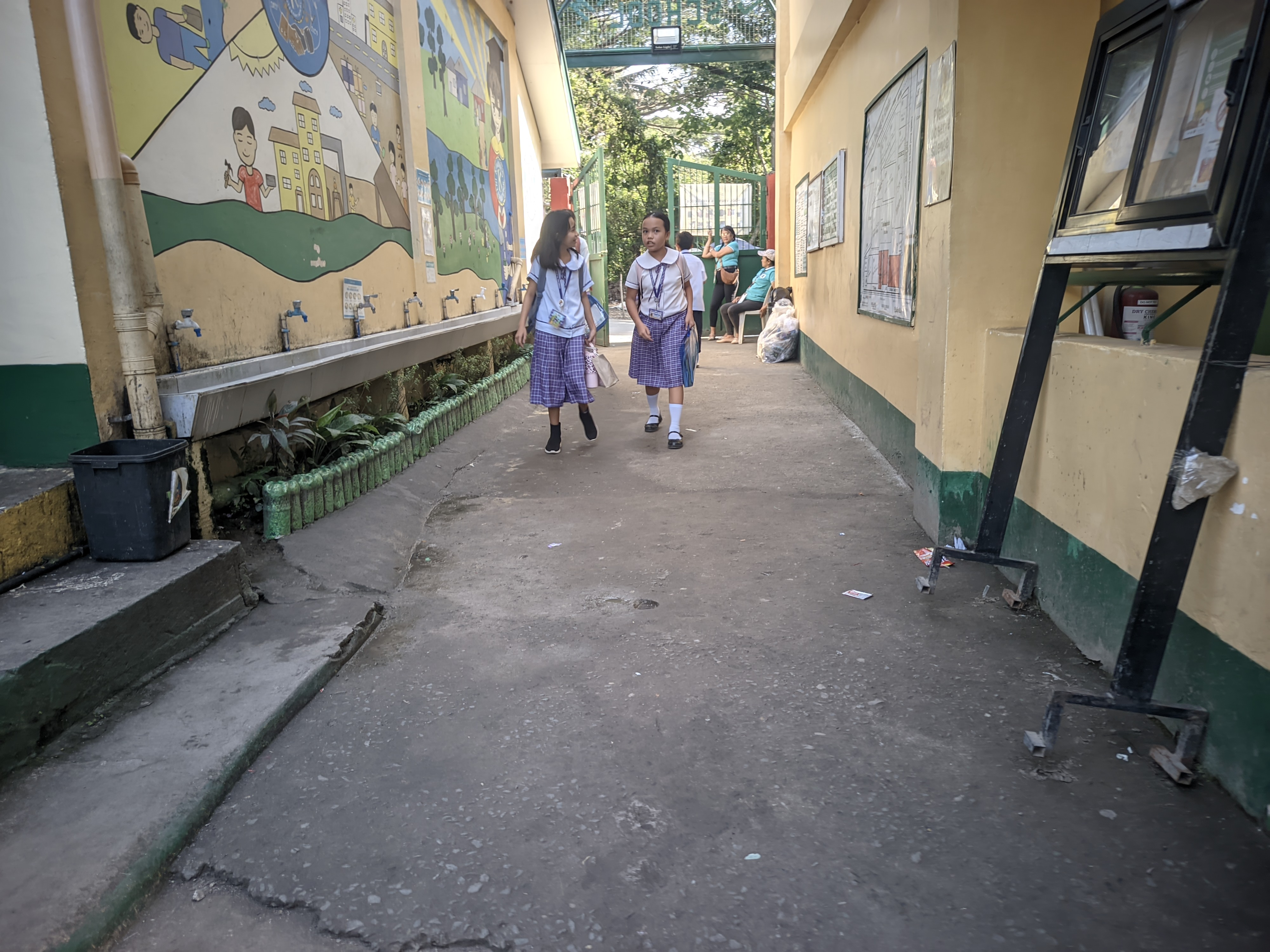
Students at the entrance of an elementary school in the Philippines

The Philippines is currently in the midst of a transition to a K-12 (also called K+12) basic education system. Education ideally begins with one year of kinder. Once the transition is complete, elementary or grade school comprises grades 1 to 6. Although the term student may refer to learners of any age or level, the term 'pupil' is used by the Department of Education to refer to learners in the elementary level, particularly in public schools. Secondary level or high school comprises two major divisions: grades 7 to 10 will be collectively referred to as 'junior high school', whereas grades 11 to 12 will be collectively referred to as 'senior high school'. The Department of Education refers to learners in grade 7 and above as students.

After which, students have the option to get Higher Education. This includes a bachelor's degree and master's degree, which take six years to complete. Students can also get PhDs.

=== Iran ===
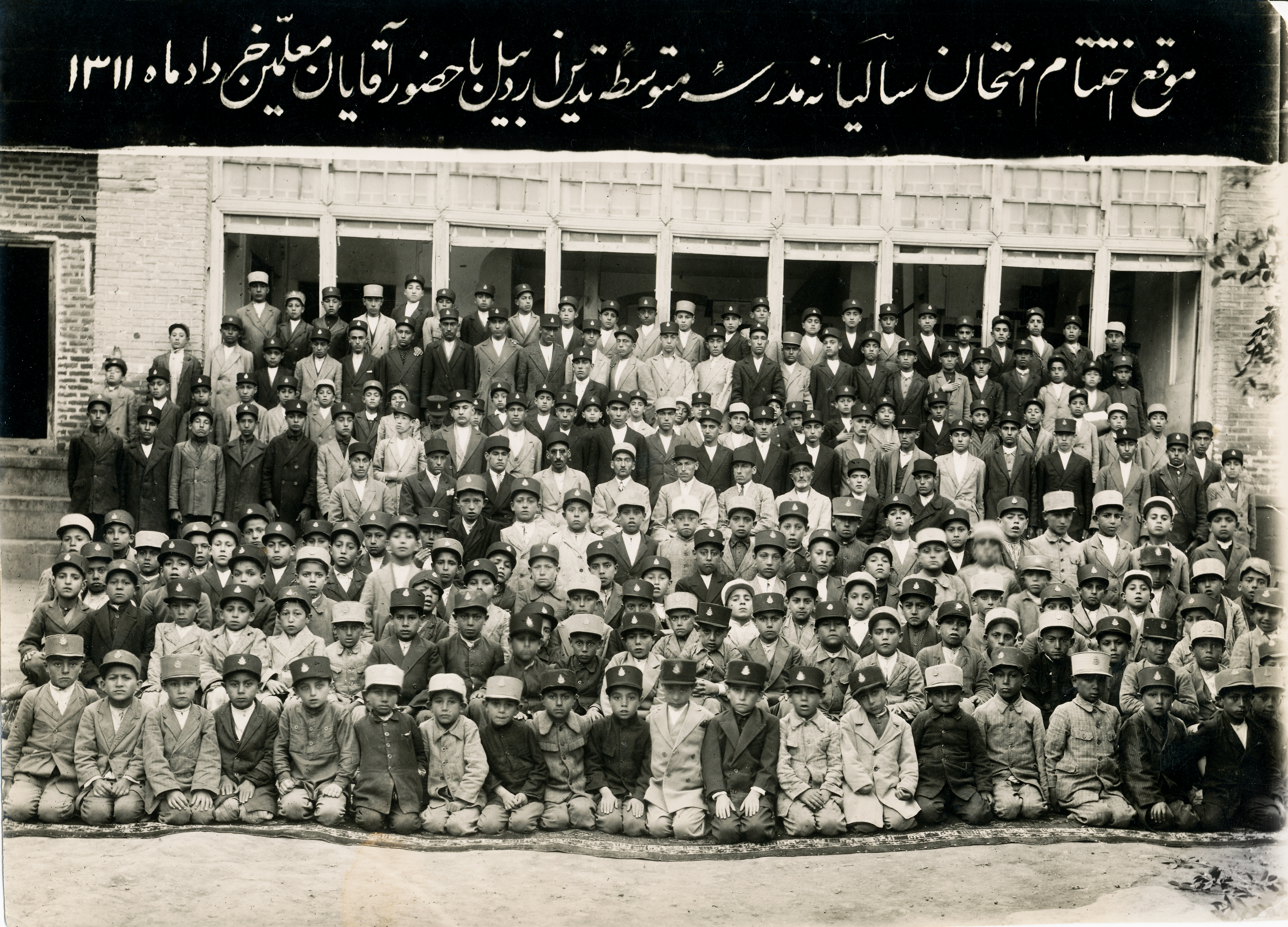
A group of students at Tadayyon Primary School in Ardabil, representing primary education in Iran in 1931

In Iran 12-year school is categorized in two stages: Elementary school and High school. It takes six years for a student to graduate from elementary school and six years for high school. High school study is divided into two part: junior and senior high school. In senior high school, students can choose between the following six fields: Mathematics and physics, Science, Humanities, Islamic science, Vocational, or Work and Knowledge. After graduating from high school, students acquire a diploma. Having a diploma, a student can participate in the Iranian University Entrance Exam or Konkoor in different fields of Mathematics, Science, Humanities, languages, and art. The university entrance exam is conducted every year by National Organization of Education Assessment, an organization under the supervision of the Ministry of Science, Research and Technology which is in charge of universities in Iran. Members of the Baháʼí Faith, a much-persecuted minority, are officially forbidden to attend university, in order to prevent members of the faith becoming doctors, lawyers or other professionals; however, Muslim, Christian, Jewish, and Zoroastrian people are allowed entry to universities.

== Oceania ==
=== Australia ===
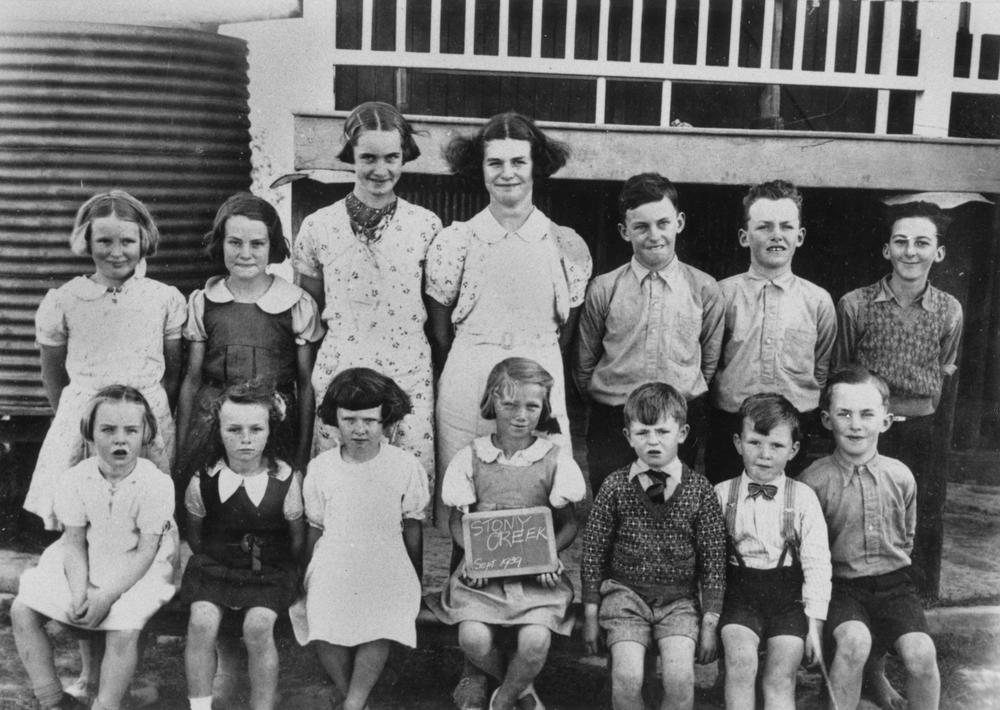
Students of Stony Creek State School, Queensland, 1939

In Australia, Pre-school is optional for three and four year olds. At age five, children begin compulsory education at Primary School, known as Kindergarten in New South Wales, Preparatory School (prep) in Victoria, and Reception in South Australia, students then continue to year one through six (ages 6 to 12). Before 2022, primary school education was to Year 7 in South Australia, and prior to 2015 was to Year 7 in Queensland and Western Australia.

Students attend High School in year seven through twelve (ages 13 – 18). After year twelve, students may attend tertiary education at university or vocational training at Technical and Further Education (TAFE).

=== New Zealand ===
In New Zealand, after kindergarten or pre-school, which is attended from ages three to five, children begin primary school, 'Year One', at five years of age. Years One to Eight are Primary School, where children commonly attend local schools in the area for that specific year group. In the majority of cases, Year Seven and Eight take place in an 'intermediate' school. From Year Nine until Year Thirteen, students attend a secondary school or a college.

== Europe ==
=== Finland ===
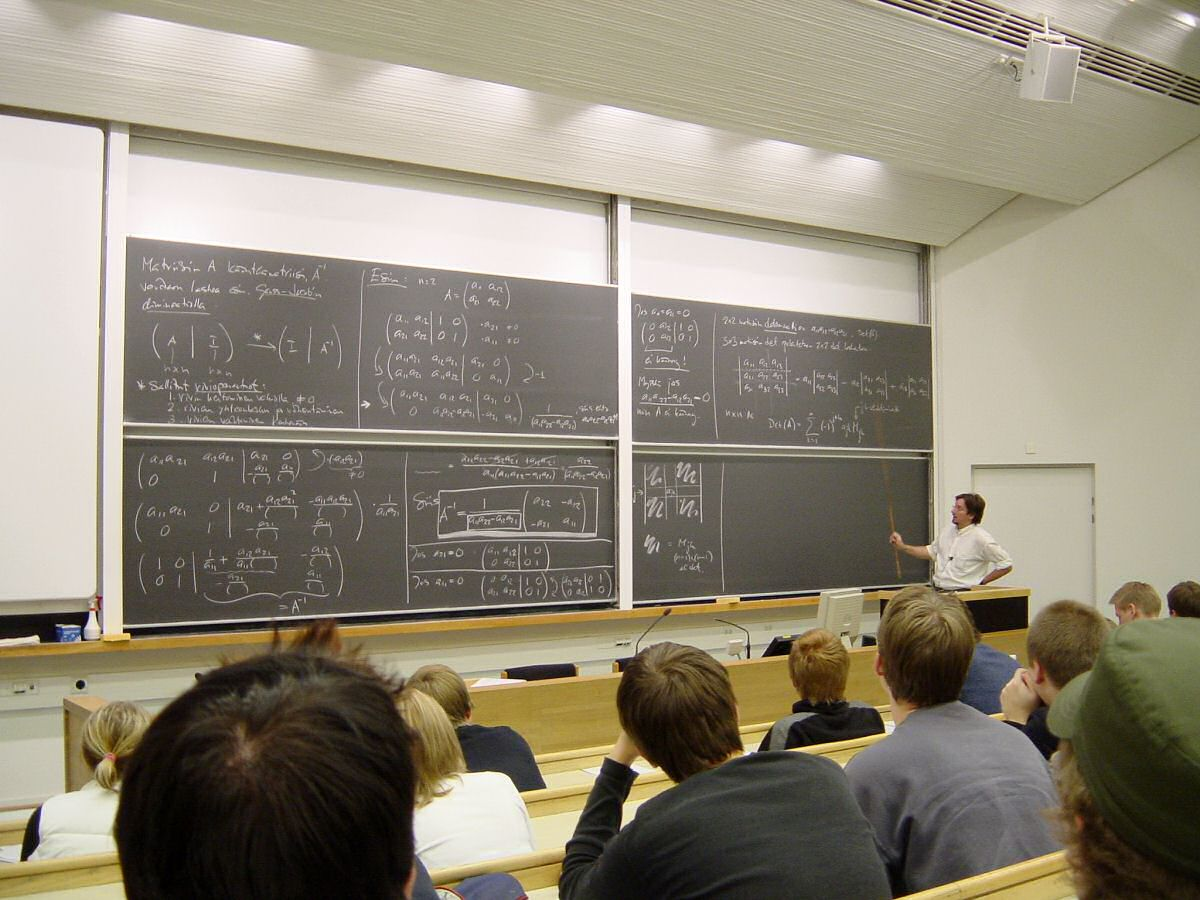
Students in a lecture on linear algebra at the Helsinki University of Technology

In Finland a student is called "opiskelija" (plural being 'opiskelijat'), though children in compulsory education are called "oppilas" (plural being 'oppilaat'). First level of education is "esikoulu" (literally 'preschool'), which used to be optional, but has been compulsory since the beginning of year 2015. Children attend esikoulu the year they turn six, and next year they start attending "peruskoulu" (literally "basic school", corresponds to American elementary school, middle school and junior high), which is compulsory. Peruskoulu is divided to "alakoulu" (years 1 through 6) and "yläkoulu" (years 7 through 9). After compulsory education most children attend second-level education (toisen asteen koulutus), either lukio (corresponds to high school) or ammattioppilaitos (Vocational School), at which point they are called students (opiskelija). Some attend "kymppiluokka", which is a retake on some yläkoulu's education.

=== France ===
The generic term "étudiant" (lit. student) applies only to someone attending a university or a school of a similar level, that is to say pupils in a cursus reserved to people already owning a Baccalauréat. The general term for a person going to primary or secondary school is élève. In some French higher education establishments, a bleu or "bizuth" is a first-year student. Second-year students are sometimes called "carrés" (squares). Some other terms may apply in specific schools, some depending on the classe préparatoire aux grandes écoles attended.

=== Germany ===
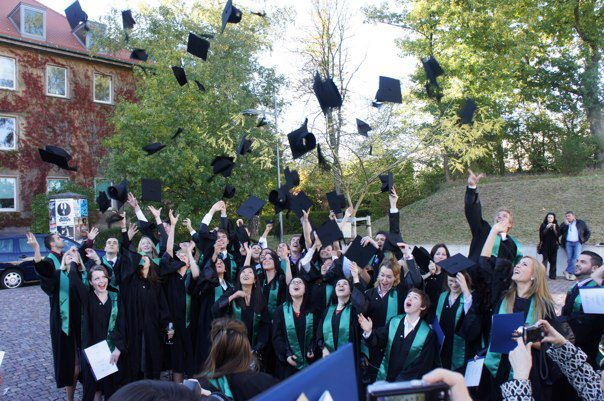
The new graduates of the Europa-Institut in Germany gather to throw their mortar boards in the air as part of a graduation ceremony.

In Germany, the German cognate term Student (male) or "Studentin" (female) is reserved for those attending a university. University students in their first year are called Erstsemester or colloquially Ersties ("firsties"). Different terms for school students exist, depending on which kind of school is attended by the student. The general term for a person going to school is Schüler or Schülerin. They begin their first four (in some federal estates six) years in primary school or Grundschule. They then graduate to a secondary school called Gymnasium, which is a university preparatory school. Students attending this school are called Gymnasiasten, while those attending other schools are called Hauptschüler or Realschüler. Students who graduate with the Abitur are called Abiturienten.

=== Greece ===
In Greece, students are split into groups, Early childhood education (ages 0-6), Primary education (ages 6-12), Secondary education (ages 12-18), and Higher education (ages 18+). There are also Lifelong Learning centers for both formal and informal education.

=== Ireland ===
In Ireland, pupils officially start with primary school which consists of eight years: junior infants, senior infants, first class to sixth class (ages 5–11). After primary school, pupils proceed to the secondary school level. Here they first enter the junior cycle, which consists of first year to third year (ages 11–14). At the end of third year, all students must sit a compulsory state examination called the Junior Certificate. After third year, pupils have the option of taking a "transition year" or fourth year (usually at age 15–16). In transition year pupils take a break from regular studies to pursue other activities that help to promote their personal, social, vocational and educational development, and to prepares them for their role as autonomous, participative and responsible members of society. It also provides a bridge to enable pupils to make the transition from the more dependent type of learning associated with the Junior Cert. to the more independent learning environment associated with the senior cycle.

After the junior cycle pupils advance to the senior cycle, which consists of fifth year and sixth year (usually ages between 16 and 18). At the end of the sixth year a final state examination is required to be sat by all pupils, known as the Leaving Certificate. The Leaving Cert. is the basis for all Irish pupils who wish to do so to advance to higher education via a points system. A maximum of 625 points can be achieved. All higher education courses have a minimum of points needed for admission.

At Trinity College Dublin under-graduate students are formally called "junior freshmen", "senior freshmen", "junior sophister" or "senior sophister", according to the year they have reached in the typical four year degree course. Sophister is another term for a sophomore, though the term is rarely used in other institutions and is largely limited to Trinity College Dublin.

At university, the term "fresher" is used to describe new students who are just beginning their first year. The term, "first year" is the more commonly used and connotation-free term for students in their first year. The week at the start of a new year is called "Freshers' Week" or "Welcome Week", with a programme of special events to welcome new students. An undergraduate in the last year of study before graduation is generally known as a "finalist".

=== Italy ===
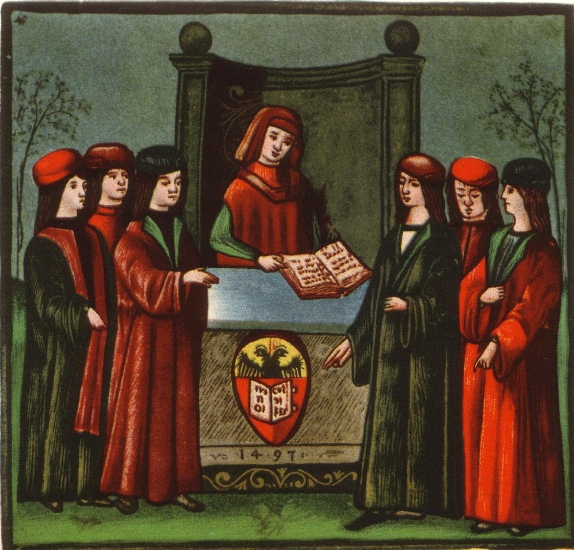
Admission of a student in "Germanic Nation", University of Bologna, 15th century

In Italian, a matricola is a first-year student. Some other terms may apply in specific schools, some depending on the liceo classico or liceo scientifico attended.

According to the goliardic initiation traditions the grades granted (following approximately the year of enrollment at university) are: matricola (freshman), fagiolo (sophomore), colonna (junior), and anziano (senior), but most of the distinctions are rarely used outside Goliardia.

=== Sweden ===
In Sweden, only those studying at university level are called students (student, plural studenter). To graduate from upper secondary school (gymnasium) is called ta studenten (literally "to take the student"), but after the graduation festivities, the graduate is no longer a student unless he or she enrolls at university-level education. At lower levels, the word elev (plural elever) is used. As a general term for all stages of education, the word studerande (plural also studerande) is used, meaning 'studying [person]'.

=== United Kingdom ===
Traditionally, the term "student" is reserved for people studying at university level in the United Kingdom.

At universities in the UK, the term "fresher" is used informally to describe new students who are just beginning their first year. Although it is not unusual to call someone a fresher after their first few weeks at university, they are typically referred to as "first years" or "first year students".

The ancient Scottish University of St Andrews uses the terms "bejant" for a first year (from the French "bec-jaune" – "yellow beak", "fledgling"). Second years are called "semi-bejants", third years are known as "tertians", and fourth years, or others in their final year of study, are called "magistrands".

In England and Wales, primary school begins with an optional "nursery" year (either in a primary school or a privately run nursery,) followed by reception and then move on to "year one, year two" and so on until "year six" (all in primary school.) In state schools, children join secondary school when they are 11–12 years old in what used to be called "first form" and is now known as "year 7". They go up to year 11 (formerly "fifth form") and then join the sixth form, either at the same school or at a separate sixth form college. A pupil entering a private, fee-paying school (usually at age 13) would join the "third form" – equivalent to year 9. Many schools have an alternate name for first years, some with a derogatory basis, but in others acting merely as a description – for example "shells" (non-derogatory) or "grubs" (derogatory).

In Northern Ireland and Scotland, it is very similar but with some differences. Pupils start off in nursery or reception aged 3 to 4, and then start primary school in "P1" (P standing for primary) or year 1. They then continue primary school until "P7" or year 7. After that they start secondary school at 11 years old, this is called "1st year" or year 8 in Northern Ireland, or "S1" in Scotland. They continue secondary school until the age of 16 at "5th year", year 12 or "S5", and then it is the choice of the individual pupil to decide to continue in school and (in Northern Ireland) do AS levels (known as "lower sixth") and then the next year to do A levels (known as "upper sixth"). In Scotland, students aged 16–18 take Highers, followed by Advanced Highers. Alternatively, pupils can leave and go into full-time employment or to start in a technical college.

Large increases in the size of student populations in the UK and the effect this has had on some university towns or on areas of cities located near universities have become a concern in the UK since 2000. A report by Universities UK, Studentification: A Guide to Opportunities, Challenges and Practice (2006) has explored the subject and made various recommendations. A particular problem in many locations is seen as the impact of students on the availability, quality and price of rented and owner-occupied property.

== Americas ==
=== Canada ===
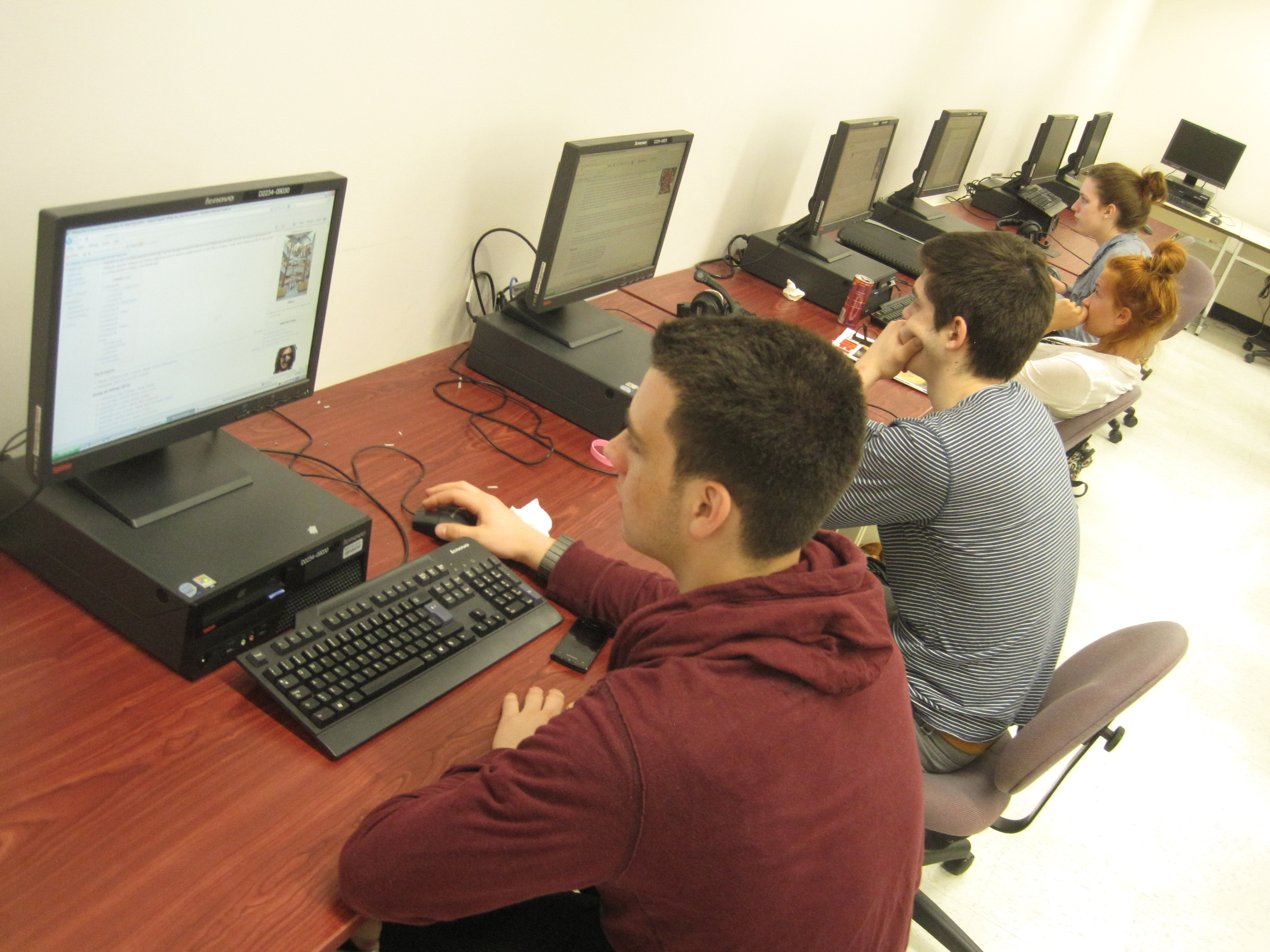
Students of the Cégep de St-Hyacinthe in Quebec working in a computer lab

Education in Canada (a federal state) is primarily within the constitutional jurisdiction of the provinces. The overall school curricula are overseen by the provincial and territorial governments, therefore the way educational stages are grouped and named can differ. Education is generally divided into primary, secondary and post-secondary stages. Primary and secondary education are generally divided into annual grades from 1 to 12, although grade 1 may be preceded by one or two years of kindergarten (which may be optional). Specifically, Ontario, Quebec and the Northwest Territories offer junior then senior kindergarten (in French, either pre-maternelle then maternelle, or maternelle then jardin d'enfants).

Education in Ontario from 1988 involved an Ontario Academic Credit (OAC) after grade 12 primarily as university preparation, but that was phased out in 2003. The OAC was informally known as "grade 13" (which it had replaced). All provinces and territories except Quebec now have 12 grades.

Education in Quebec differs from the other jurisdictions in that it has an école primaire ("primary school") consisting of grades 1–6 and an école secondaire ("secondary school") consisting of secondaries I–V, equivalent to grades 7–11. A student graduating from école secondaire then either completes a three-year college program or a two-year pre-university program required before attending university. In some English-language écoles secondaire and most French-language écoles secondaire, students refer to secondaries I–V as years one through five. This can be confusing for those outside of Quebec, especially out of context.

In some provinces, grades 1 through 5 are called "elementary school", grades 6 to 8 are called "middle school" or "junior high school", and grades 9 to 12 are considered high school. Other provinces, such as British Columbia, mainly divide schooling into elementary school (Kindergarten to grade 7) and secondary school (grades 8 through 12). In Alberta and Nova Scotia, elementary consists of kindergarten through grade 6. Junior high consists of Grades 7–9. High school consists of Grades 10–12. In English provinces, the high school (known as academy or secondary school) years can be referred to simply as first, second, third and fourth year. Some areas call it by grade such as grade 10, grade 11 and grade 12.

In Canadian English, the term "college" usually refers to a technical, trades, applied arts, applied technology, or applied science school or community college. These are post-secondary institutions typically granting two-year certificates, diplomas or associate degrees and (in some cases) three-year bachelor's degrees. The French acronym specific to public institutions within Quebec's system of pre-university and technical education is CEGEP (Collège d'enseignement général et professionnel, "college of general and professional education"). CEGEP is a collegiate level institution in Quebec that most students typically enrol in, whether to learn a trade or applied discipline or to qualify for entrance to university in the Quebec education system. (In Ontario and Alberta, there are also institutions that only grant undergraduate degrees which are designated university colleges to differentiate them from universities, which have both undergraduate and graduate programs.)

In Canada, there is a strong distinction between "college" and "university". In conversation, one specifically would say either "they are going to university" (i.e., studying for a three- or four-year degree at a university) or "they are going to college" (i.e., studying at a technical/career training).

A Canadian post-secondary college is generally geared for individuals seeking applied careers, while universities are geared for individuals seeking more academic careers.

University students are generally classified as first, second, third or fourth-year students, and the American system of classifying them as "freshmen", "sophomores", "juniors" and "seniors" is seldom used or even understood in Canada. In some occasions, they can be called "senior ones", "twos", "threes" and "fours".

=== United States ===
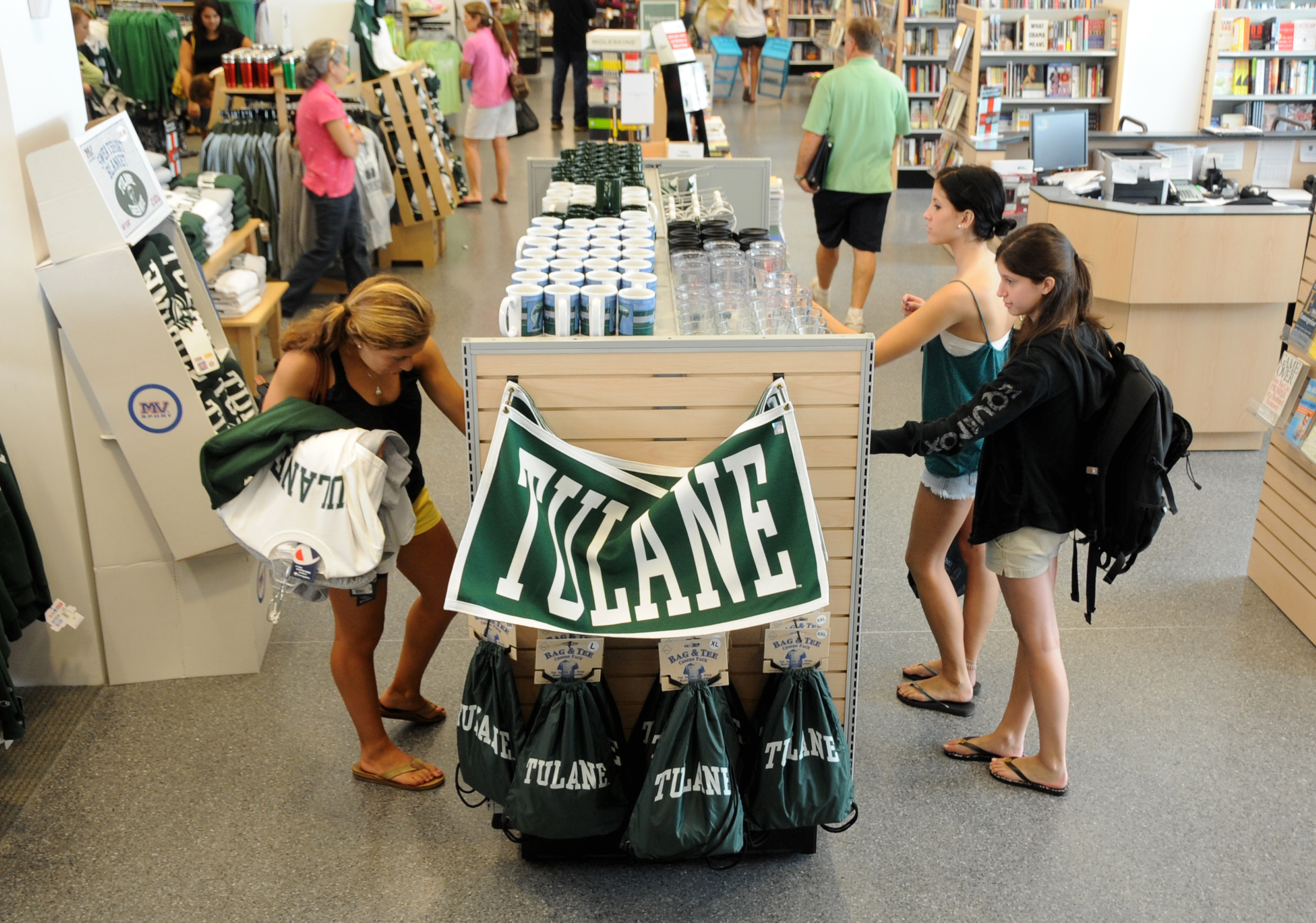
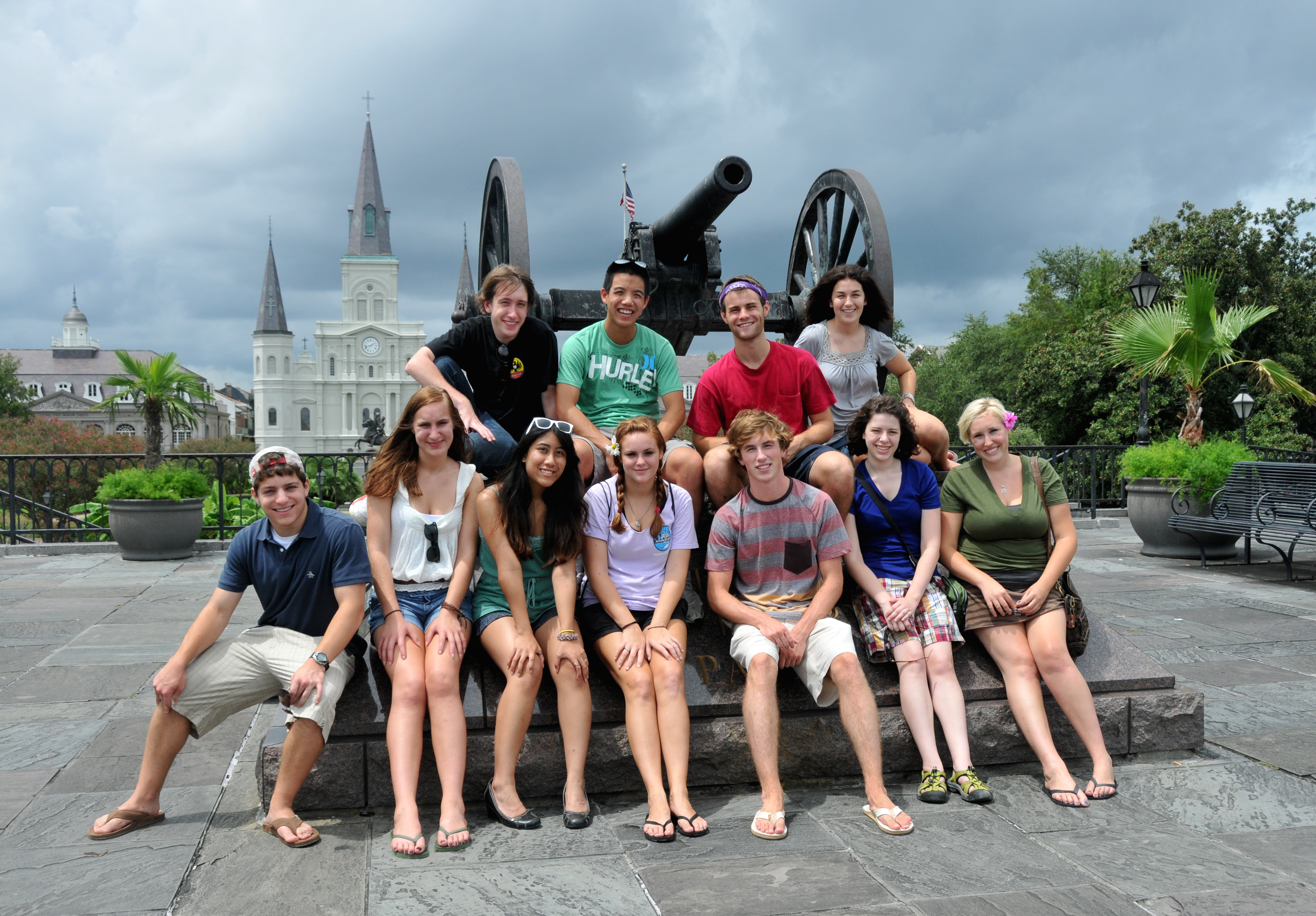
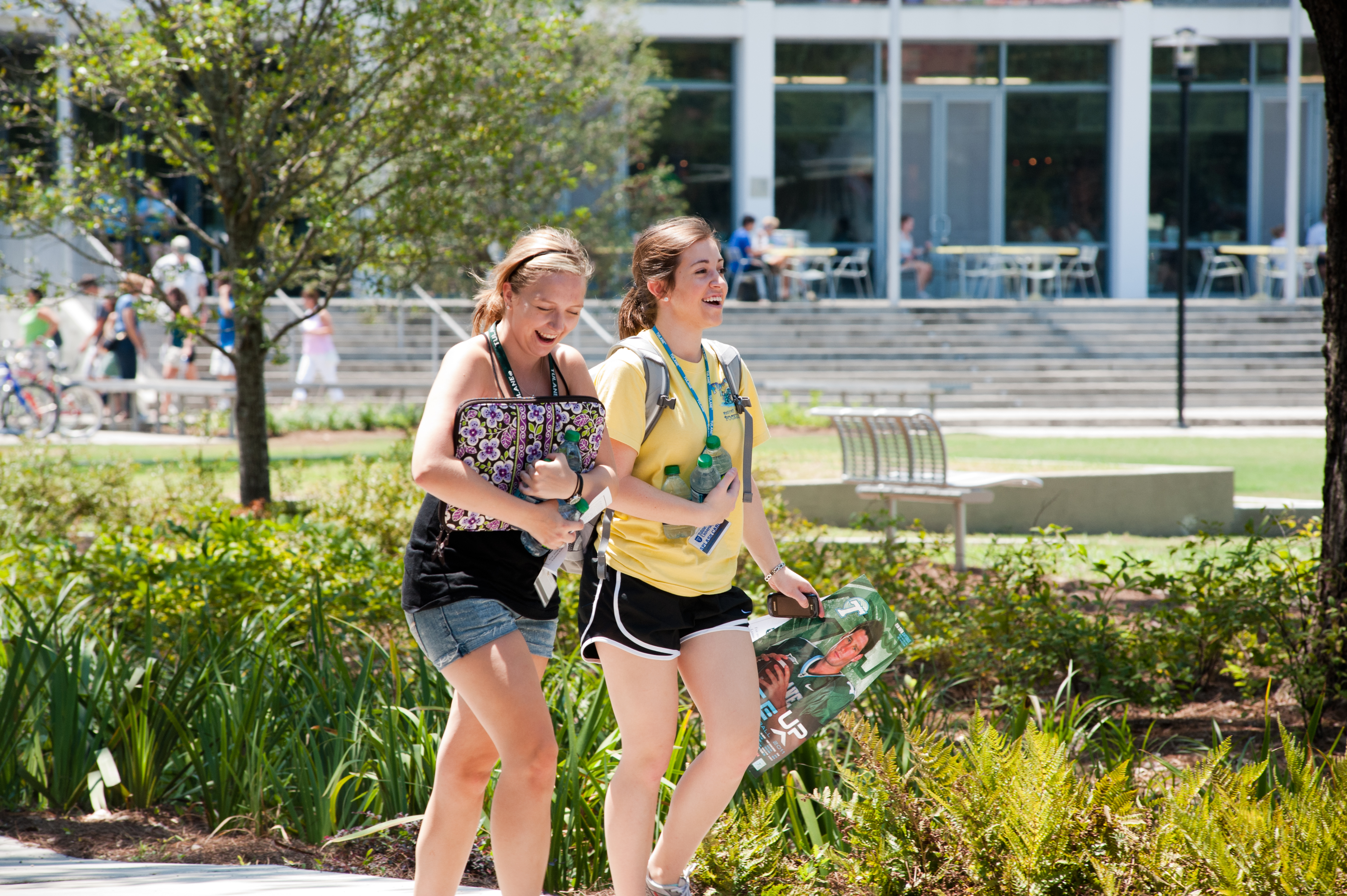
Students of Tulane University in the U.S. (from top to bottom): at its bookstore, in a class photo (with their teacher sitting on extreme right), and entering class

In the United States, the first official year of schooling is called kindergarten, which is why the students are called kindergarteners. Kindergarten is optional in most states, but few students skip this level. Preschool is for kids ages 2 to 5 pre-K is specifically designed for ages 4 to 5 in the year before kindergarten. Pre-K programs are more about kindergarten readiness.

In the United States, it varies from state, though there are 9 to 13 years of mandatory schooling. The first six are called elementary school, and go from kindergarten to 5th grade. Middle school is 6th, 7th and 8th grade. High school is 9th to 12th grade. They have alternate names for students, namely freshman, sophomore, junior and senior. The actual divisions of which grade levels belong to which division (whether elementary, middle, junior high, or high school) is a matter decided by state or local jurisdictions.

College students are often called freshmen, sophomores, juniors, and seniors. They are called super seniors if they are doing more than the traditional four years.

==== First year ====
The first year of college or high school is referred to as Freshman year. A freshman is a first-year student in college, university or high school.

==== Second year ====
In the U.S., a sophomore, also called a "soph", is a second-year student. Outside the United States, the term sophomore is rarely used, with second-year students simply called "second years". Folk etymology indicates that the word means "wise fool"; consequently "sophomoric" means "pretentious, bombastic, inflated in style or manner; immature, crude, superficial" (according to the Oxford English Dictionary). It is widely assumed to be formed from Greek Sophos, meaning "wise", and Moros meaning "foolish", although the etymology suggests an origin from the now-defunct "sophomore", an obsolete variant of "sophism".

==== Post-second year ====
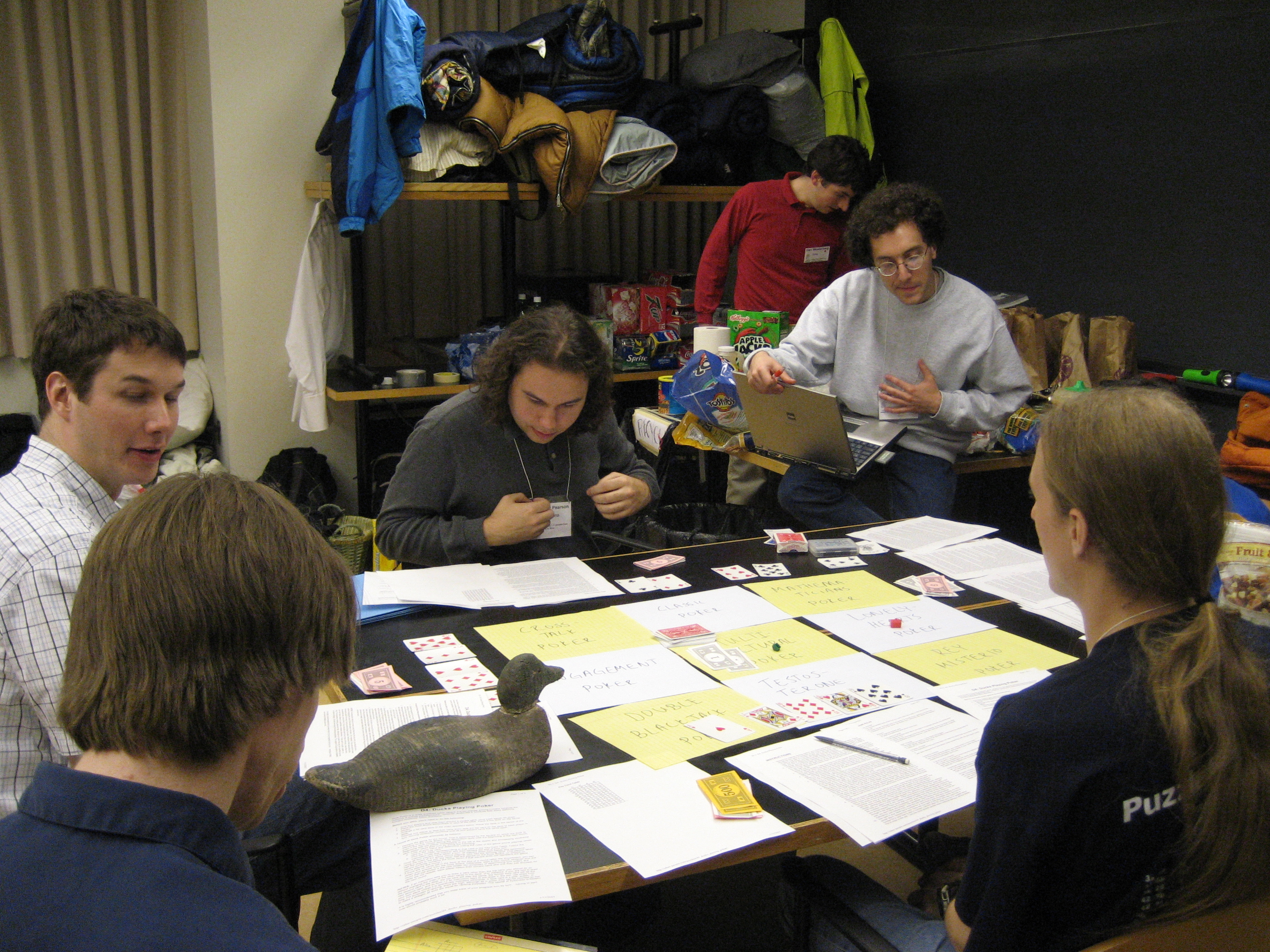
Students from the Massachusetts Institute of Technology

In the U.S., a Junior is a student in the penultimate (usually third) year and a Senior is a student in the last (usually fourth) year of college, university, or high school. A student who takes more than the average number of years to graduate is sometimes referred to as a "super senior". This term is often used in college but can be used in high school as well. It can mean that a student is taking their senior year for a second time. The term underclassman refers collectively to Freshmen and Sophomores, and upperclassman refers collectively to Juniors and Seniors. The term Middler is used to describe a third-year student of a school (generally college) that offers five years of study.

==== Graduate students ====
A graduate student is a student who continues their education after graduation. Some of these are master's degrees, doctoral degrees, professional degrees, and graduate certificates, which are the highest level of academic degree and require several years of study after a bachelor's degree.

==== Vocational school ====
Students attending vocational school focus on their jobs and learning how to work in specific fields of work. A vocational program typically takes much less time to complete than a four-year degree program, lasting 12–24 months.

== Student politics ==
Students sometimes speak out in critical cultural and political movements. They are speak up on issues ranging from social justice, climate change, fair pay, and equity in education.

== Mature students ==
An adult learner—or, more commonly, a mature student or mature-age student—is a person who is older and is involved in forms of learning. Adult learners fall in a specific criterion of being experienced, and do not always have a high school diploma. Many adult learners go back to school to finish a degree, or earn a new one.

Malcolm Knowles's work distinguished adult learners as distinct from adolescent and child learners in his principle of andragogy. He established 5 assumptions about the adult learner. This included self-concept, adult learner experience, readiness to learn, orientation to learning, and motivation to learning.

== Student pranks ==
University students have been associated with pranks and japes since the creation of universities in the Middle Ages. These can often involve petty crime, such as the theft of traffic cones and other public property, or hoaxes. It is also not uncommon for students from one school to steal or deface the mascot of a rival school. In fact, pranks play such a significant part in student culture that numerous books have been published that focus on the issue.

== Other terms ==
- Students who are repeating a grade level of schooling due to poor grades are sometimes referred to as having been "held back" or "kept back". Sometimes students are described as "retained" or "repeaters".
- The term 'pupil' (originally a Latin term for a minor as the ward of an adult guardian, etc.) is used in some Commonwealth primary and secondary schools (particularly in England and Wales) instead of "student", but once attending further education (at a sixth-form college) or higher education (at university for example), the term "student" is standard. The term pupil is also used in the Philippines by the Department of Education to refer to learners currently in elementary school; the term student is used for by the Department of Education for learners in high school.
- The United States military academies officially use only numerical terms, but there are colloquial expressions used in everyday speech. In order from first year to fourth year, students are referred to as "fourth-class", "third-class", "second-class", and "first-class" cadets or midshipmen. Unofficially, other terms are used, for example at the United States Military Academy, freshmen are called "plebes", sophomores are called "yearlings" or "yuks", juniors are called "cows", and seniors are called "firsties". Some universities also use numerical terms to identify classes; students enter as "first-years" and graduate as "fourth-years" (or, in some cases, "fifth-years", "sixth-years", etc.).

== Idiomatic use ==
"Freshman" and "sophomore" are sometimes used figuratively, almost exclusively in the United States, to refer to a first or second effort ("the singer's sophomore album"), or to a politician's first or second term in office ("freshman senator") or an athlete's first or second year on a professional sports team. "Junior" and "senior" are not used in this figurative way to refer to third and fourth years or efforts, because of those words' broader meanings of "younger" and "older". A junior senator is therefore not one who is in a third term of office, but merely one who has not been in the Senate as long as the other senator from their state. Confusingly, this means that it is possible to be both a "freshman senator" and a "senior senator" simultaneously: for example, if a senator wins election in 2008, and then the other senator from the same state steps down and a new senator elected in 2010, the former senator is both senior senator (having been in the Senate for two years longer) and a freshman senator (being still in their first term).

== International Students' Day ==
International Students' Day (17 November) remembers the anniversary of the 1939 Nazi storming of the University of Prague after student demonstrations against the German occupation of Czechoslovakia. Germans closed all Czech universities and colleges, sent over 1200 students to Nazi concentration camps, and had nine student leaders executed (on 17 November).

== See also ==
- Bullying in academia
- Bullying in teaching
- Dormitory
- Freshman 15
- Homeschooling
- International student
- Learning
- School bullying
- School uniform
- Student activism
- Student club
- Student orientation
- School counselor
- Student financial aid in the United States
- Study skills
- Studentification
- Tutor
- Teacher
- University student retention
- Youth
