= Pruner (surname) =

Pruner is a surname. Notable people with the surname include:

- Alexandra Pruner, American business executive
- Franz Ignaz Pruner (1808–1882), German physician, ophthalmologist, and anthropologist
- James Dean Pruner (1951–1987 or 1988), American artist
- Karl Pruner, Canadian actor
