= Alexander Kapp (German educator and editor) =

German educator and historian of pedagogics (1800–1869)

- Born: 1799; Ludwigsstadt, Germany
- Died: 1869 (aged 70); Soest
- Occupations: Educator, editor, author
- Known for: Coining the term Andragogy (1833)
- Relatives: Ernst Kapp (brother)

Alexander Kapp (1800–1869) was a German educator and editor, brother of Ernst Kapp. In 1833, he originally introduced the term andragogy. Andragogy consists of learning strategies focused on adults. It is often interpreted as the process of engaging adult learners in the structure of the learning experience. Later, the term andragogy developed into a theory of adult education by the American educator, Malcolm Knowles. Kapp used andragogy to describe elements of Plato's education theory. Andragogy (andr- meaning 'man') could be contrasted with pedagogy (paid- meaning 'child' and agogos meaning 'leading') (see Davenport 1993: 114) Although Kapp's use of andragogy had some currency, it was disputed, and its use ground to a halt. In 1921, the term reappeared in a report by Rosenstock in which he argued that 'adult education required special teachers, methods and philosophy, and he used the term andragogy to refer collectively to these special requirements' (Nottingham Andragogy Group 1983: v).
