= Adult learner =

Student who is an adult and returning to or starting full-time education

An adult learner—or, more commonly, a mature student or mature-age student—is a person who is older and is involved in forms of learning. Adult learners fall in a specific criterion of being experienced, and do not always have a high school diploma. Many adult learners go back to school to finish a degree, or earn a new one.

Malcolm Knowles's work distinguished adult learners as distinct from adolescent and child learners in his principle of andragogy. He established 5 assumptions about the adult learner. This included self-concept, adult learner experience, readiness to learn, orientation to learning, and motivation to learning.

== Criteria ==
In the US, adult learners who are undergraduates fall into the category of nontraditional students. They have a wide range of cultural, job, and educational backgrounds.

In the UK, a student is normally classified as a mature student if they are an undergraduate student who is at least 25+ years old at the start of their course, or in the Irish case on the first of January of the year of entry, and usually having been away from school for at least two years. The normal entry requirements for school-leavers wishing to start an undergraduate degree are often not applied to mature students.

== In higher education ==
The impact of a rapidly changing society is reflected in the growing number of adults engaged in a formal part-time course of study at an institution of higher education.

Studies have shown that during the last few decades, there has been a shift from postsecondary degree seekers, from traditional students to a more diverse population who normally work part-time, full-time and/or have family commitments. This phenomenon has created a larger bank of adult learners who attend colleges and who face a myriad of challenges committing to their education.

Adult students are frequently referred to as nontraditional students in higher education. Adult students are contrasted with traditional students, who are typically under 25, attend full-time, do not work full-time when enrolled in courses, and have few, if any, family responsibilities. In 2008, 36 percent of postsecondary students were age 25 or older and 47 percent were independent students.

== Special characteristics ==
Adult learners are considered “in a state of transition”, trying to improve themselves by achieving a higher level of education in order to move up in the professional environment. Their expectations are greater than those of a traditional student, because they have a better idea of what they want and what they expect from their education. However, they also have higher levels of anxiety and pressure to fulfill the required expectations in a shorter amount of time, while navigating other responsibilities.

Adult learners typically have more life experiences. When confronted with new knowledge or an experience, adult learners construe new meaning based on their greater life experiences.

== Potential challenges faced by adult learners ==
There are many challenges faced by adult learners such as family commitments, work, financial barriers, lack of time, support, and a clear understanding of how to balance it all, especially if they still would like to have some kind of social life.

Another big challenge is the ever changing technological world in which we now live. For an adult learner who is past their 40s, they grew up in a world where our dependency in technology was nonexistent. Distant learning was something that was not available, but it is now one of the main sources of adult education.
