= Alexandra Pruner =

American business executive

- Education: Brown University
- Occupations: Senior Advisor, Former CFO & Partner at Perella Weinberg Partners

Alexandra “Alie” Pruner is an American business executive, who currently serves as a senior advisor at global financial services firm Perella Weinberg Partners where she was Chief Financial Officer and Partner from 2016 through November 2018. She is known as one of the founders of energy boutique investment bank Tudor, Pickering, Holt & Co., where she also served as CFO before the bank combined with Perella Weinberg in 2016.

== Personal life and education ==
Pruner is originally from Chicago and attended the University of Chicago Laboratory Schools. She went on to attend Brown University where she earned a bachelor's degree in economics. She is married to David Pruner, Partner at Heidrick & Struggles, who also serves as an adjunct professor in Management and Finance at Rice University, and has two children.

== Business career ==
Pruner's first job in financial services was at Shearson Lehman Brothers, where she worked as a vice president in New York. She later spent several years as a Director of Investor Relations, first at NUI Corporation and then at the Houston Exploration Company. In 2002, Pruner was named Publisher of World Oil magazine and promoted to Senior Vice President of Gulf Publishing Company.

In 2007, Pruner co-founded Tudor Pickering, Holt & Co., where she helped oversee the company's growth from 20 to 150 employees during her first few years at the firm. Pruner became a Partner and CFO of Perella Weinberg Partners in 2016, after Tudor Pickering combined with the firm.

Pruner founded the Women's Global Leadership Conference in Energy & Technology in 2003, one of the largest women's events in the oil and gas industry.

== Awards and board positions ==
Pruner served as an independent director on the Board of Anadarko Petroleum. She currently serves on the Boards of Directors of Plains All American (NYSE: PAA and PAAGP), NRG Energy (NYSE: NRG), as well as CPPIB-backed Encino Acquisition Partners. In 2018, Pruner was named one of the “25 Most Influential Women in Energy” by Oil & Gas Investor magazine. She was named CFO of the Year for a medium-sized private company by Houston Business Journal in 2013.

Pruner chairs the Advisory Council for Brown University's Economics Department and received an Alumni Service Award from Brown for her continuing service to the University.

== Philanthropy ==
Pruner currently serves on the Board of Directors of The Houston Zoo and served on the Executive Committee of United Way of Greater Houston, a nonprofit organization tackling key social issues in the community. She previously served as Co-Chair of the Alexis de Tocqueville Society at the United Way organization. She also has served as the President of the Houston Symphony Endowment.
