= University of the Third Age =

Educational and social movement of older people

The University of the Third Age (U3A) is an international movement whose aims are the education and stimulation of mainly retired members of the community — those in their third "age" of life.

There is no universally accepted model for the U3A. Its original conception in France as an extramural university activity was significantly modified in the United Kingdom, where it was recognised that most people of retirement age have something to contribute and the emphasis has been on sharing, without formal educational links.

Many English-speaking countries have followed this geragogic model, whereas continental European countries have mostly followed the French model.

A British u3a website reports this about membership eligibility: "There is no minimum age, but a focus on people who are no longer in full-time employment or raising a family."

Despite its name, it is not considered a university. The New Zealand Education Act prohibits use of the terms "degree" and "university" by institutions other than the country's eight accredited universities. In 2004 authorities announced their intention to take action against unaccredited schools using the words "degree" and "university," hitting both degree mills and u3a.

== History ==
=== France ===
u3a started in France at the Faculty of Social Sciences in Toulouse in 1973. It was started by Prof. Pierre Vellas. In France, each University of the Third Age University group is mostly associated with a local university. This academic model is used in many other countries, in particular in continental Europe. The university affiliation generates various opportunities such as highly qualified teaching personnel, a variety of subject choices, opportunity for students and faculty to conduct research based on the professional, cultural or historical experiences of the elderly, etc. U3As do not issue diplomas but rather certificates and teach in many fields according to the interests of the groups of older students (usually 55+) such as computer skills, languages, entrepreneurship, hereditary law, religion, politics, etc. Sometimes U3As provide groups with vocational training and formal continuous education opportunities.

In the 1990s the concept was broadened in France to the notion of the University of All Ages (UTA - université tous âges) or University of Free Time (UTL - université du temps libre). The UFUTA changed its name to Union Française des Universités de Tous Ages (retaining the acronym). Some French university departments have adopted the title of Université du Temps Libre.

AIUTA (Association Internationale des Universités du Troisième Âge) is the global international organization and network of Universities of the Third Age, including such institutions from most continental European countries, Central and East Europe, China, Russia, Latin America, etc., including Mauritius and other destinations.

=== United Kingdom ===
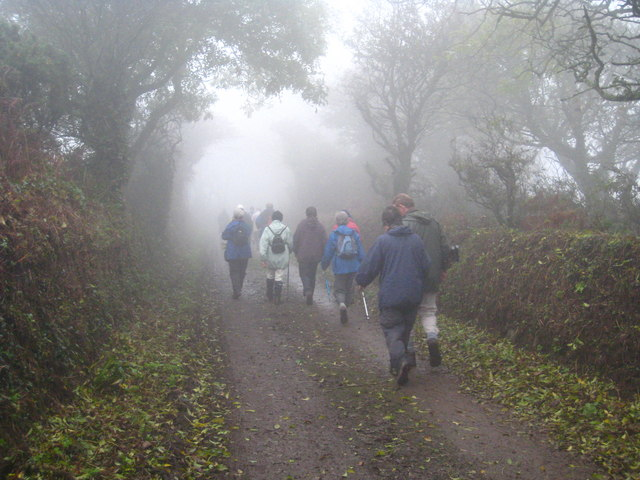
Carrick, Cornwall, u3a walking group on a scenic walk.

Growth in membership of U3A in UK

In 1981, the concept reached the United Kingdom, where its nature was radically changed to be more a self-help organisation under the influence of its founders, Peter Laslett, Michael Young and Eric Midwinter.

In 2020, the UK organisation changed its name to u3a in a rebrand

The UK network comprises in excess of 1,000 groups, in towns and cities; as of March 2025, total membership was around 400,000.

Each u3a is formally structured as an independent self-financing and self-managing charity with links to the u3a, a national coordinating body. Each individual u3a comprises a number of activity groups which may cover a wide range of different topics - e.g. arts, languages, physical activity, discussion, and games. Most u3as are centred on a particular town or region and their activity groups meet in a hired hall or small groups meet in a member's house. Although primarily for the retired, many u3as open their membership to any people not in full-time employment.

Interest Groups Online (abbreviated as IGO) is an online u3a community that gives people the opportunity to join groups, talks and courses from the comfort of home. In the same way as a u3a, the activities are run by members and are a great way to meet people from all across the u3a movement

Some groups in other countries affiliate to the Third Age Trust. For example, in Cyprus there are C3A (Cyprus Third Age) and P3A (Paphos Third Age).

=== Central and Eastern Europe ===
Some Central (and Eastern) European countries were introduced to the U3A quite early: Poland, Czech Republic (formerly part of Czechoslovakia) and Slovenia. The Slovenian University of the Third Age was started by two university professors in 1984 and has developed into a network of 40 universities over the entire country. The Italian University of the Third Age is called Università delle Tre Età (UNITRE) with several locations in the country. "UNITRE Milano", the university of the third age in Milan, provides courses as well as educational content such as on line courses and peer-reviewed journal articles.

There is an online University of the Third Age in Russia.

=== Spain ===
With a large numbers of immigrants (aka expats) from the UK, the U3A is well represented in Spain. Most groups are centred around coastal areas known for english speaking populations.

Each U3A operates independently, as there is not a single organisation overseeing U3A in Spain. Each U3A usually offer a range of special interest groups to members.

=== Australia ===
U3A began in Australia in 1984 and as of 2023, has grown to 250 U3As with approximately 100,000 members. These are based in metropolitan, regional and rural areas, and follow the British self-help model of teaching and learning over a wide range of subject areas, dependent upon the membership's own expertise, knowledge and skills.

Each U3A operates independently and takes the needs and interests of their members into consideration when deciding which classes/activities they will offer. U3As offer membership at very low cost so that anyone in their third age (nearing retirement and beyond) can become a member. Each U3A is also a member of a state/territory Network (where available), and can share ideas/tutors and resources.

U3AA (U3A Australia) is the national body formed by state networks to support all U3As in their state or territory with a range of resources.

=== Canada ===
The Third Age Network (TAN) is active in Canada, however currently only within the province of Ontario. The head office is located at the Chang School of Continuing Education at Toronto Metropolitan University in Toronto. The network started in 2007 and has grown to 21 groups by 2018. Simon Fraser University was the first university in North America to create a series of courses for seniors at the post-secondary level. Its mandate was to provide educational programs for older adults that were responsive to their psychological and physiological characteristics.

The Third Age Mission: "To foster Third Age Learning and share issues and solutions to common organizational challenges. We do this by promoting the establishment of organizations that provide opportunities for older adults to learn in a friendly, social setting and by supporting adult learning organizations in this process by sharing strategies and techniques to accomplish this goal."

TAN runs a newsletter and hosts organization-wide symposiums and forums. It also provides support to local groups with things like information on speakers, networking with colleagues, data on member operations, including honoraria paid to speakers, board make up, rental costs, affordable group insurance, a regular newsletter, conferences and workshop, guidance for creating a website, internal and external communication.

=== Turkey ===
Ege 3rd University (U3A) is a social responsibility project initiated in 2016 at Ege University Faculty of Medicine, Department of Geriatrics in Izmir. Trainings are carried out entirely on a voluntary basis, nearly 300 teachers teach. In addition to the weekday classes, public seminars are also held in Ege U3A training.

U3A students carry out projects in cooperation with non-governmental organizations for community service and intergenerational communication

University of Health Sciences, Türkiye (Sağlık Bilimleri Üniversitesi) launched the University of Third Age (U3A) in 2019 as a multidisciplinary educational program designed to support individuals aged 60 and over in a holistic manner—physically, mentally, and socially. Implemented in collaboration with local authorities such as the Kadıköy District Governorship, the program seeks to enhance the knowledge levels of older adults and facilitate their social integration by combining academic instruction with socio-cultural activities. The teaching staff comprises university faculty members, healthcare professionals, and experienced trainers from public education centers. The curriculum includes academic courses such as geriatrics, healthy aging, pharmacology, first aid, occupational therapy, analytical thinking, and health law, alongside personal development-oriented modules including physical exercise, communication skills, drama, and sign language. The program’s objectives extend beyond the acquisition of knowledge; it also aims to foster self-confidence, reduce social isolation, and promote active and healthy aging.

Since its launch in 2019, the program has graduated 125 participants. In the 2024–2025 academic year, more than 90 students are actively enrolled in both the basic and advanced levels of the program.

Admission requirements include being between the ages of 60 and 75, holding at least a primary school diploma, residing in districts near the university, and not having any physical or mental impairments that would hinder participation. Participants are selected based on their willingness to learn and their voluntary engagement. The educational program spans a total of two years (four semesters), with the first year designed as a basic level and the second year as an advanced level. This initiative by the University of Health Sciences represents a robust model of the University of the Third Age in Turkey, grounded in scientific principles and practical application. It stands as a strong candidate for AIUTA membership, with both national relevance and the potential for international collaboration.

== Courses ==
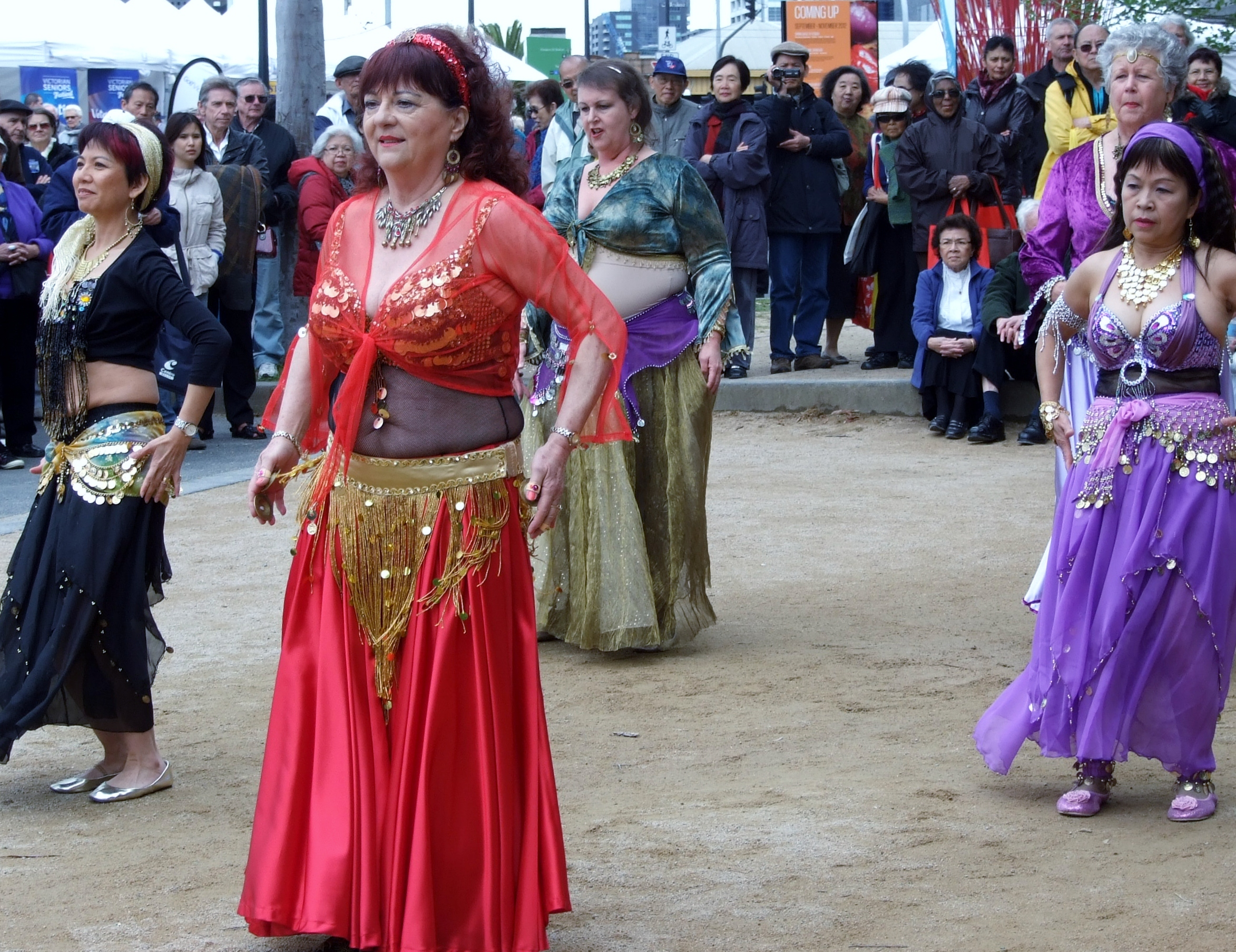
Nunawading U3A Belly Dancing Group at the 2012 Carnival of Learning at Federation Square, Melbourne

Typical courses include Art, Classical Studies, Conversation, Computers, Crafts, Debate, Drama, Film/Cinema Studies, History, Languages, Literature, Music, Sciences, Social Sciences, and Philosophy.

There are also many less educationally-focused activities, such as Games (including bridge tuition and duplicate bridge playing groups), Health, Fitness & Leisure (including countryside walks), Theatre/Concert Clubs, Travel Clubs, and Dance in all its forms.

Some study groups work to a formal syllabus, but others draw on current affairs or specific interests of group members. Some groups are designed to cross disciplinary boundaries, for example, combining Society, Technology and Science in a fashion not practical in more formal academic environments.

U3A groups launched Walking Cricket in England to keep older adults active despite mobility constraints and to combat social isolation. It is now taken seriously by cricket authorities such as the ECB.

U3A groups are well positioned to conduct serious research into local history and genealogy.

== Bibliography ==
- Midwinter, E. (2004) "500 Beacons: The U3A Story", Third Age Press UK. KINDLE edition (2014).
- Beckett, Francis. The U3A Story. Third Age Trust. Archived from the original (PDF) on August 11, 2017.
- Formosa, M. (2000). "Older adult education in a Maltese University of the Third Age: A critical perspective". Education and Ageing, 15(3): 315–339.
- Formosa, M. (2005). "Feminism and critical educational gerontology: An agenda for good practice". Ageing International, 30(4): 396–411.
- Formosa, M. (2007). "A Bourdieusian interpretation of the University of the Third Age in Malta". Journal of Maltese Education Research, 4(2): 1–16.
- Formosa, M. (2009). "Renewing Universities of the Third Age: Challenges and visions for the future". Recerca, 9: 171–196.
- Formosa, M. (2010). "Lifelong learning in later life: The Universities of the Third Age". Lifelong Learning Institute Review, 5: 1–12.
- Kerka, Sandra (1999). "Universities of the Third Age: Learning in Retirement" (PDF). Trends and Issues (Alert no. 2). ERIC. Archived from the original (PDF) on 2007-11-10 – via www.calpro-online.org.
- Midwinter, Eric C. (1984), Mutual aid universities: a self-help approach to educating older people, Routledge, ISBN 0-7099-3523-4
- Swindell, R. & Thompson, J. (1995). "An international perspective of the University of the Third Age". Educational Gerontology, 21(5): 429–447.
- Swindell, Rick (September 2002). "U3A Online: a virtual university of the third age for isolated older people". International Journal of Lifelong Education. 21 (5): 414–429. doi:10.1080/02601370210156727. ISSN 0260-1370.
- Szeloch, H. (2011). "Na naukę nigdy nie jest za późno". "Nowe Życie", (445)9: 11–12.
- Sahin, Sevnaz; Kocakoc, Nurgul; Arayici, Mehmet Emin; Baybas, Bugçe Kamer; Boyacioglu, Hayal; Akcicek, Selahattin Fehmi (March 2023). "Evaluation of the quality of life in the university of third age students: a cross-sectional study". European Geriatric Medicine. 14 (2): 389–396. doi:10.1007/s41999-023-00764-3. ISSN 1878-7657. PMID 36959487.
- Kocakoç N, Şahin S. Age-friendly health institutions. Uçku SR, Simsek Keskin H, editors. Elderly Health and Problems. 1st Edition. Ankara: Türkiye Clinics; 2021, pp.55–61.
- Yavuz, Cemil; Şahin, Sevnaz (July 2023). "The impact of a videoconferencing-implemented program on older adults' psychosocial health in the COVID -19 pandemic: an experimental study". Psychogeriatrics. 23 (4): 561–570. doi:10.1111/psyg.12961. ISSN 1346-3500. PMID 37072132.
- 3. Age University (Aegean Refreshment) Textbook 1, İzmir 2021.
