= Geragogy =

Science of education of older adults

Geragogy (also geragogics) is a theory which argues that older adults are sufficiently different that they warrant a separate educational theory. The term eldergogy has also been used. Some critics have noted that "one should not expect from geragogy some comprehensive educational theory for older adult learners, but only an awareness of and sensitivity towards gerontological issues".

Key distinctions between traditional pedagogy and geragogy include offering "opportunities for older adult learners to set the curriculum themselves and to learn through activities of personal relevance" as well as recognition of age-related issues which may affect learning, such as reduced sensory perception, limited motor capabilities and changes in cognitive processes, especially memory.

Collaborative peer learning, as employed in the University of the Third Age, is a common element within geragogic settings.

== Principles of geragogy ==
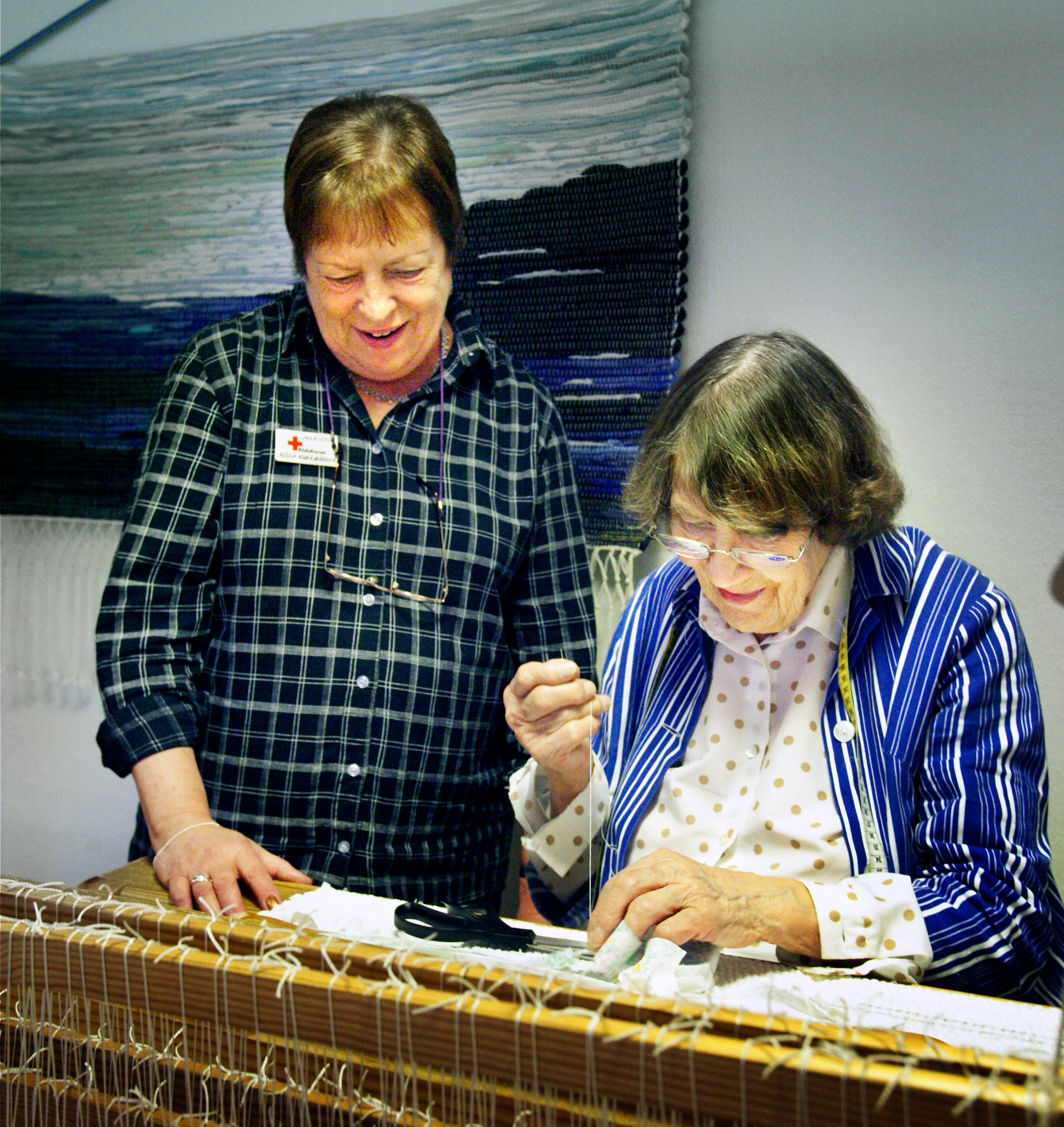
Older people in a peer learning setting

From John, Martha T. (1988). Geragogy: A theory for teaching the elderly:

- Learning should aim to provide skills and resources which maintain personal independence. Useful, practical outcomes must therefore be highlighted before a course of study begins, and any assigned tasks must have meaning for older adults. Enjoyment, curiosity, seeking information and desiring communication are typical routes into learning.
- Variety in teaching methods is required, rather than reliance on lengthy verbal presentations. A flexible, interdisciplinary approach which responds to the needs of the learners present is vital.
- Tutors should strive to maintain a clear focus on the topic, limiting the number of ideas presented. Irrelevant or overly distracting concepts should be avoided.
- In place of discipline or rote-learning, tutors should stimulate engagement with warmth, positive comments, approval and encouragement.
- Learners may take longer to complete tasks and assignments than younger people. They may also wish to return repeatedly to a task until they feel comfortable. Examples should be reinforced regularly and often, using differing contexts in order to give as many opportunities as possible for learners to grasp a concept.
- The past experiences of learners can be useful in grounding their understanding. Tutors should seek to review specific skills which allow each learner to be creative in their own way, building on their personal life experience. It is also important to review information that may have been learned in the past (such as at school) but has not been used for some time.

== See also ==
- Andragogy – Methods and principles in adult education
