= Malcolm Knowles =

American educator (1913–1997)

Malcolm Shepherd Knowles
- Born: August 24, 1913; Livingston, Montana, US
- Died: November 27, 1997 (aged 84); Fayetteville, Arkansas, US
- Education: A.B., 1934; M.A., 1949; Ph.D., 1960
- Alma mater: Harvard University, University of Chicago
- Known for: andragogy, adult education
- Political party: Democrat
- Board member of: Massachusetts Adult Education Association (member of governing board)
- Spouse: Hulda Elisabet Fornell (m. August 20, 1935)
- Children: 2

Malcolm Shepherd Knowles (August 24, 1913 – November 27, 1997) was an American adult educator, famous for the adoption of the theory of andragogy—initially a term coined by the German teacher Alexander Kapp. Knowles is credited with being a fundamental influence in the development of the Humanist Learning Theory and the use of learner constructed contracts or plans to guide learning experiences.

== Biographical information ==
Born in Montana to Dr. and Mrs. A. D. Knowles, Knowles was an avid Boy Scout in his youth. The family moved to West Palm Beach, Florida, and he graduated from Palm Beach High School in 1930. He earned a scholarship to Harvard University, where he graduated with a Bachelor of Arts in 1934.

Shortly afterwards, he worked with the National Youth Administration in Massachusetts, and was married to Hulda Fornell, whom he met while studying at Harvard.

In 1940, he assumed the position of Director of Adult Education at the Boston YMCA until he was drafted into the United States Navy in 1943. In 1946, he moved to Chicago to work as the Director of Adult Education at the YMCA while working on his M.A. at the University of Chicago, which he earned in 1949. From 1951 to 1959 he served as executive director of the Adult Education Association of the USA and pursued his PhD at the University of Chicago. In 1959, he accepted a faculty appointment at Boston University as an associate professor of adult education with tenure. He spent 14 years there.

He became a member of the faculty of Education at North Carolina State University in 1974 to complete his final four years of academic work prior to retirement. After retiring, he remained active in the field into the 1990s. He taught at Fielding Graduate University, Santa Barbara, California (which offers degrees in clinical psychology and related subjects) and at the University of Arkansas.

He died in Fayetteville, Arkansas, of a stroke.

== Selected bibliography ==
During his career he authored over 230 articles and 18 books, some of which include:

- Knowles, Malcolm S. (1950). Informal adult education: a guide for administrators, leaders, and teachers. New York: Association Press.
- Knowles, M. S., & Knowles, H. F. (1955). How to develop better leaders. New York: Association Press.
- Knowles, M. S., & Knowles, H. F. (1959). Introduction to group dynamics. Chicago: Association Press. Revised edition 1972 *published by New York: Cambridge Books.
- Knowles, M. S. (1968). Andragogy, not pedagogy. Adult Leadership, 16(10), 350–352, 386.
- Knowles, M. S. (1973). The adult learner: A neglected species. Houston: Gulf Publishing Company. Revised Edition 1990.
- Knowles, M. S. (1975). Self-directed learning: A guide for learners and teachers. Englewood Cliffs: Prentice Hall/Cambridge.
- Knowles, M. S. (1977). The adult education movement in the United States. Malabar, FL: Krieger.
- Knowles, M. S. (1980). The modern practice of adult education: From pedagogy to andragogy. Englewood Cliffs: Prentice Hall/Cambridge.
- Knowles, M. S., et al. (1984). Andragogy in action: Applying modern principles of adult education. San Francisco: Jossey-Bass.
- Knowles, M. S. (1986). Using learning contracts. San Francisco: Jossey-Bass.
- Knowles, M. S. (1989). The making of an adult educator: An autobiographical journey. San Francisco: Jossey-Bass.
- Knowles, Malcolm; Holton, E. F. III; Swanson, R. A. (2005). The adult learner: The definitive classic in adult education and human resource development (6th ed.). Burlington, MA: Elsevier. ISBN 9780750678377.

== See also ==
- Adult education
- Andragogy
- Humanism (philosophy of education)
- Instructional theory
