= James Dean Pruner =

American painter

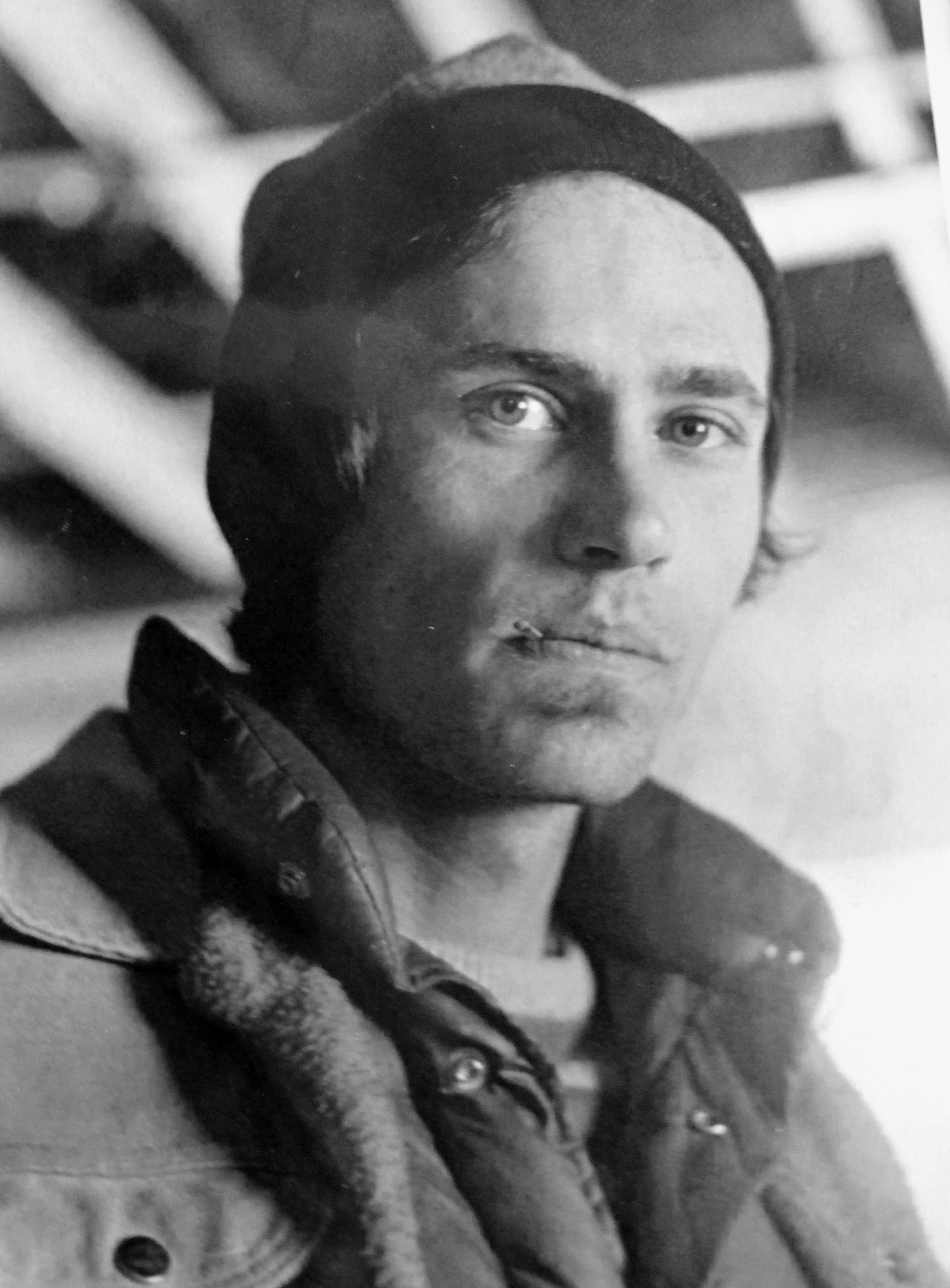
- James Dean Pruner, ca. early 1980s
- Born: 1951; Lyons, Kansas, US
- Died: between December 1987 and April 1988; Stafford County, Kansas, US
- Education: Fort Hays State University; Pittsburg State University; Emporia State University

James Dean Pruner (1951 – 1987/8) was an American painter, printmaker, draftsman, zinemaker, sculptor, and poet. Born in Lyons, Kansas, he also lived in Hays, Ellinwood, St. John, and in rural Stafford County, Kansas, where he farmed and maintained a studio. His works include a diverse range of subjects and styles, but with several consistent themes, including human relationships, animals and the land, and problems he associated with modern life, nuclear warfare, and technology. He produced more than 300 paintings, thousands of ink drawings, prints and etchings, silk-screened cards and posters, and more than 50 sculpture and assemblage pieces during his lifetime. Pruner's works can be found in the collection of the Spencer Museum of Art at The University of Kansas, at The Stone Gallery in Hays, KS, and in numerous private collections.

== Early life and education ==
Pruner was the second of three children born to Rosaleen Pruner (1928-1985) and Levon W. "Lee" Pruner (1922-2001).

He attended Fort Hays State University before completing his BA in 1975 at Pittsburg State University and his MA in 1976 at Emporia State University. In the catalog for his graduate exhibition in 1976, he writes:
"My sense of humor and ability to communicate thru non-traditional avenues connect and interrelate, creating art which smiles at the anxiety, frustration, and pressure of 20th century living. I twist historical themes, use personal symbols, reconstruct my knowledge of the masters, and receive inspiration from friends.
"I am influenced by de Kooning's means of producing an image. The gesture, rapidity, and spontaneity are important in my quest to capture this likeness. I use historically visual remains; reinterpret and produce. From Rembrandt's "Dutch Masters" to Diebenkorn's "Ocean Park Series" my paintings emerge and continue to grow.
"The "Story of Love" is a series of exotic landscape paintings. The work fuses the necessity of speed with the harmony of color. In this age of mass sterilization and dissatisfaction the "Story of Love" portrays my efforts to reach a different realization. The bittersweet destination of these paintings directs my fantastic notions of survival."

== 1970s and 1980s ==
"At 36, he'd become one of the Midwest's most distinctive painters and a colorful figure among the area's no-frills farm folk," writes Doug Hitchcock for Borderline magazine. After completing his MA, Pruner moved to Ellinwood, KS, where he rented a small studio that he shared with another artist. When his studio-mate destroyed the studio (and eight years of Pruner's work), Pruner moved to rural Stafford County, where his mother owned 40 acres of land. On this remote property, Pruner moved a 1950s-era bus, which he converted into his studio and living space. He painted continuously, while also cultivating a small-scale farm and building a living space for himself. Pruner also produced a series of prints at The Lawrence Lithography Workshop, in Lawrence, Kansas, with Michael Sims.

His works from this period indicate a consistent iconography, drawn from dreams and magic (some images resemble Tarot cards), and inspired by the landscape colors that surrounded him. "His paintings almost vibrated with bright, clashing colors, or deep, rich hues. The paint itself appeared to glow, as if illuminated from within. He achieved this by using thin layers of oil paint on a white ground: applying enough pigment to suggest color, letting just enough ground peek through to brighten the surface."

In 1987, Pruner withdrew from the gallery circuit he had frequented in Arizona, California, and Kansas. He began experimenting with carving stone, and created assemblages that were inspired by his friendship with William S. Burroughs, who was living in Lawrence, Kansas. He produced small paintings which replaced his former iconography with new figures; skeletons presided over chaotic scenes, and the window he had painted in many earlier works disappeared. Many of his images reflected on nuclear war and a devastated natural world.

== Disappearance and death ==
In December 1987, Pruner disappeared from his home in Stafford County, Kansas. His body was found in April 1988.

== Writings and zines ==
Pruner was an avid writer, filling notebooks with his poetry and maintaining regular correspondence with many friends and family members. His poems addressed concerns about modern technology and alienation. Their titles include, "A Lesson in Being Alone," "America At War," "The Computer Age," "Mother Earth," "Peace Preserves," "Stand Back War Mongers," and "Western Man." Pruner produced several zines, including:

- Hard-Nosed Harry (1979)
- One (1) Day Close to Hell (1979)
- TV: Modern Man, Primitive Man (1984)

His images also illustrate the 1989 William S. Burroughs and Diane di Prima publication Stiletto One: A Ship of Fools.

== Selected exhibitions ==
1998

- James Dean Pruner Retrospective, at Moss-Thorns Gallery of Art, Fort Hays State University, Hays, Kansas (January 17-February 13)

1987

- Group exhibition with Jeff Bertoncino, Carole Foster Blake, Leonel Góngora, and Agnese Udinotti, at Udinotti Gallery, 8756 Wonderland Ave., Los Angeles, California 90046 (March)
- The History of Man, at Sven & Me, 120 S. Main St., Lindsborg, Kansas (August 1–31)

1986

- Stone Foundation, Hays, Kansas (April)

1985

- A Cold Winter in Great Bend, KS, Kellas Gallery, 7 East 7th St., Lawrence, Kansas, 66044 (July 20 - August 24)
- 3D, Stone Gallery, 107 W. 6th St., Hays, Kansas (June 14-July 13)
- Man and Moon: J. Pruner Paintings, Improvisation, 8162 Melrose Ave., Los Angeles, California (February 26 - March 25)

1982

- James Dean Pruner, Scissors/Paper/Stone Gallery, 1101 1/2 Mass St., Lawrence, Kansas (June 19 - July 17)

1976

- Graduate Exhibition, College Art Building, Emporia Kansas State College, Emporia, Kansas (December 6–18)
- Udinotti Gallery, 4215 N. Marshall Way, Scottsdale, Arizona 85251

== The James Dean Pruner Project ==
Tell It To The Horses: The James Dean Pruner Project, a monographic publication and corresponding solo exhibition of James Dean Pruner's work is planned for 2016-2017 and is being coordinated by Laura A. L. Wellen of Houston, Texas, with support from Pruner's family.
