= Andragogy =

Methods and principles in adult education

Andragogy refers to methods and principles used in adult education. The word comes from the Greek ἀνδρ- (andr-), meaning "adult male", and ἀγωγός (agogos), meaning "leader of". Therefore, andragogy literally means "leading men (adult males)", whereas "pedagogy" literally means "leading children".

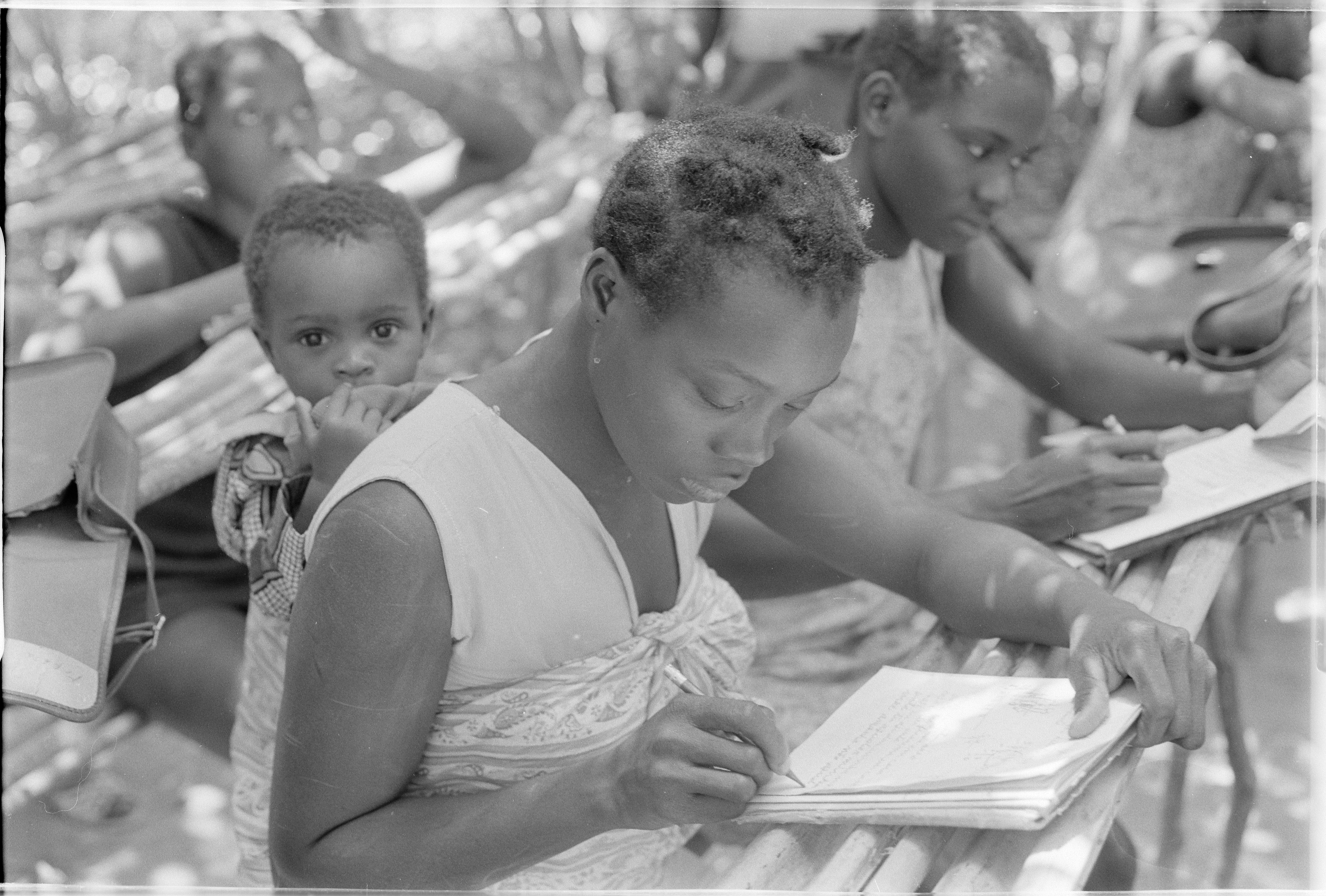
ASC Leiden - Coutinho Collection - 6 19 - School for adults in Guinea-Bissau - 1974

== Definitions ==
There are many different theories in the areas of learning, teaching and training. Andragogy commonly is defined as the art or science of teaching adults or helping adults learn. In contrast to pedagogy, or the teaching of children, andragogy is based on a humanistic conception of self-directed and autonomous learners where teachers are defined as facilitators of learning.

Although Malcolm Knowles proposed andragogy as a theory, others posit that there is no single theory of adult learning or andragogy. In the literature where adult learning theory is often identified as a principle or an assumption, there are a variety of different approaches and theories that are also evolving in view of evolving higher education instruction, workplace training, new technology and online learning (Omoregie, 2021).

Malcolm Knowles identified these adult learner characteristics related to the motivation of adult learning.

1. Need to know: Adults need to know the reason for learning something.
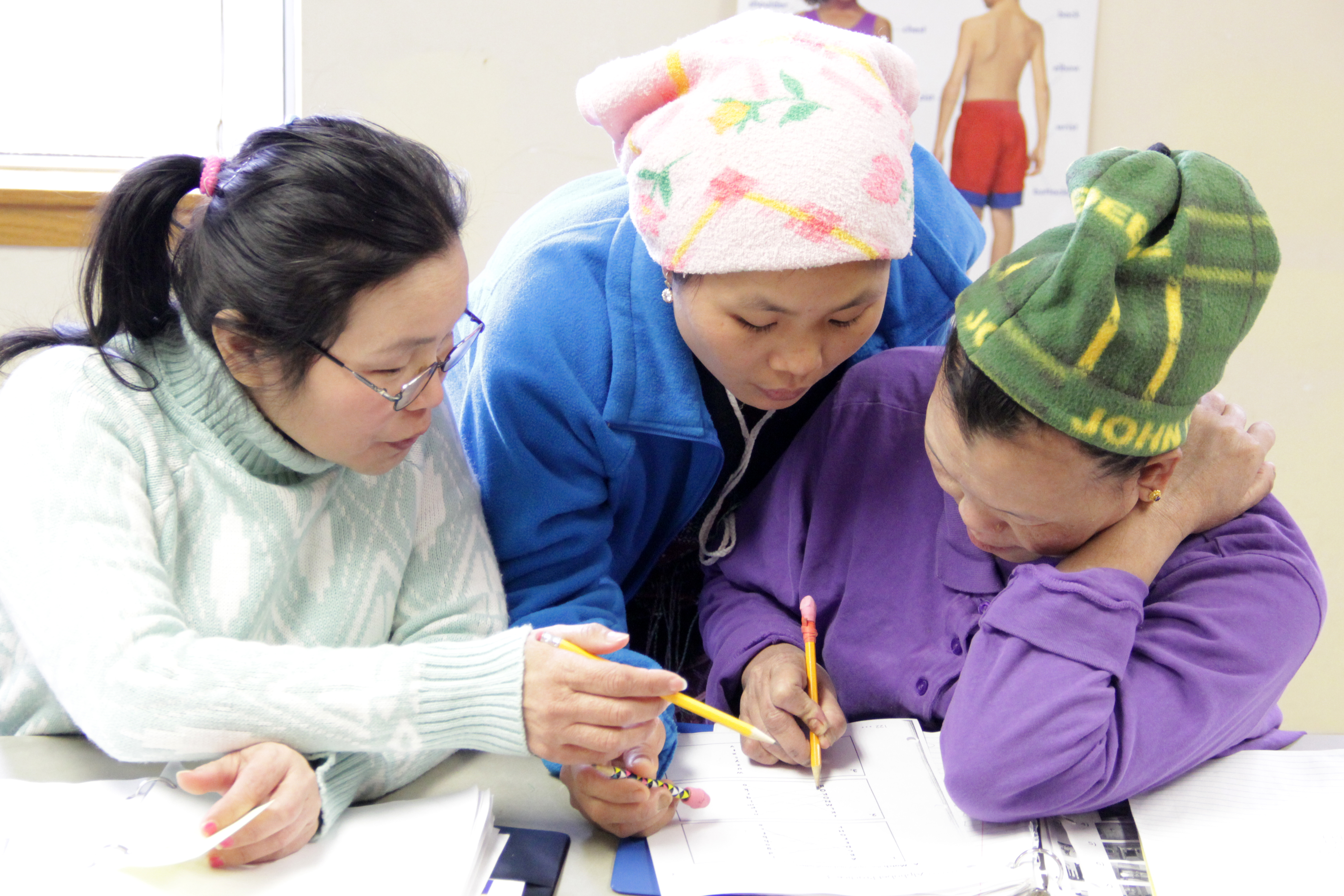
  Adult Education class: Vietnamese Social Services of Minnesota
2. Foundation: Experience (including error) provides the basis for learning activities.
3. Self-concept: Adults need to be responsible for their decisions on education; involvement in the planning and evaluation of their instruction.
4. Readiness: Adults are most interested in learning subjects having immediate relevance to their work and/or personal lives.
5. Orientation: Adult learning is problem-centered rather than content-oriented.
6. Motivation: Adults respond better to internal versus external motivators.

Blaschke (2012) described Malcolm Knowles' 1973 theory as "self-directed" learning. The goals include helping learners develop the capacity for self-direction, supporting transformational learning and promoting "emancipatory learning and social action" (Blaschke, 2019, p. 76).

Although Knowles' andragogy is a well-known theory in the English-speaking world, his theory has an ancillary role internationally. This is especially true in European countries where andragogy is a term used to refer to a field of systematic reflection. The acceptance of andragogy in European countries, according to St. Clair and Käpplinger (2021) is to accept andragogy as the "scientific study of learning in adults and the concomitant teaching approaches" (p. 485). Further, the definition of andragogy and its application to adult learning is more variable currently due to both the impact of globalization and the rapid expansion of adult online learning.

== History ==
The term was originally coined by German educator Alexander Kapp in 1833. Andragogy was developed into a theory of adult education by Eugen Rosenstock-Huessy. It later became very popular in the US by the American educator Malcolm Knowles. Knowles asserted that andragogy (Greek: "man-leading") should be distinguished from the more commonly used term pedagogy (Greek: "child-leading").

Knowles collected ideas about a theory of adult education from the end of World War II until he was introduced to the term "androgogy". In 1966, Knowles met Dušan Savićević in Boston. Savićević was the one who shared the term andragogy with Knowles and explained how it was used in the European context. In 1967, Knowles made use of the term "andragogy" to explain his theory of adult education. Then after consulting with Merriam-Webster, he corrected the spelling of the term to "andragogy" and continued to make use of the term to explain his multiple ideas about adult learning.

Knowles' theory can be stated with six assumptions related to the motivation of adult learning:

1. Need to know: Adults need to know the reason for learning something.
2. Foundation: Experience (including error) provides the basis for learning activities.
3. Self-concept: Adults need to be responsible for their decisions on education; involvement in the planning and evaluation of their instruction.
4. Readiness: Adults are most interested in learning subjects having immediate relevance to their work and/or personal lives.
5. Orientation: Adult learning is problem-centered rather than content-oriented.
6. Motivation: Adults respond better to internal versus external motivators.

In most European countries, the Knowles discussion played at best, a marginal role. "Andragogy" was, from 1970 on, connected with emerging academic and professional institutions, publications, or programs, triggered by a similar growth of adult education in practice and theory as in the United States. "Andragogy" functioned here as a header for (places of) systematic reflections, parallel to other academic headers like "biology", "medicine", and "physics".

Early examples of this use of andragogy are the Yugoslavian (scholarly) journal for adult education, named Andragogija in 1969, and the Yugoslavian Society for Andragogy; at Palacky University in Olomouc (Czech Republic) the Katedra sociologie a andragogiky (Sociology and Andragogy Department) was established in 1990. Also, Prague University has a Katedra Andragogiky (Andragogical Department); in 1993, Slovenia's Andragoski Center Republike Slovenije (Slovenian Republic Andragogy Center) was founded with the journal Andragoska Spoznanja; in 1995, Bamberg University (Germany) named a Lehrstuhl Andragogik (Androgogy Chair).

On this formal level "above practice" and specific approaches, the term "andragogy" could be used relating to all types of theories, for reflection, analysis, training, in person-oriented programs, or human resource development.

== Principles ==
Adult learning is based upon comprehension, organization and synthesis of knowledge rather than rote memory. Some scholars have proposed seven principles of adult learning:

- Adults must want to learn: They learn effectively only when they are free to direct their own learning and have a strong inner motivation to develop a new skill or acquire a particular type of knowledge, this sustains learning.
- Adults must feel they need to learn: Adults are practical in their approach to learning; they want to know, "How is this going to help me right now? Is it relevant (content, connection, and application) and does it meet my targeted goals?"
- Adults learn by doing: Adolescents learn by doing, but adults learn through active practice and participation. This helps in integrating component skills into a coherent whole.
- Adult learning focuses on problem solving: Adolescents tend to learn skills sequentially. Adults tend to start with a problem and then work to find a solution. A meaningful engagement, such as posing and answering realistic questions and problems is necessary for deeper learning. This leads to more elaborate, longer lasting, and stronger representations of the knowledge (Craik & Lockhart, 1972).
- Experience affects adult learning: Adults have more experience than adolescents. This can be an asset and a liability, if prior knowledge is inaccurate, incomplete, or immature, it can interfere with or distort the integration of incoming information (Clement, 1982; National Research Council, 2000).
- Adults learn best in an informal situation: Adolescents have to follow a curriculum. Often, adults learn by taking responsibility for the value and need of content they have to understand and the particular goals it will achieve. Being in an inviting, collaborative and networking environment as an active participant in the learning process makes it efficient.
- Adults want guidance and consideration as equal partners in the process: Adults want information that will help them improve their situation. They do not want to be told what to do and they evaluate what helps and what doesn't. They want to choose options based on their individual needs and the meaningful impact a learning engagement could provide. Socialization is more important among adults.

== Academic discipline ==
In the field of adult education during recent decades, a process of growth and differentiation emerged as a scholarly and scientific approach, andragogy. It refers to the academic discipline(s) within university programs that focus on the education of adults; andragogy exists today worldwide. The term refers to a new type of education which was not qualified by missions and visions, but by academic learning including: reflection, critique, and historical analyses.

Dušan Savićević, who provided Knowles with the term andragogy, explicitly claims andragogy as a discipline, the subject of which is the study of education and learning of adults in all its forms of expression' (Savicevic, 1999, p. 97, similarly Henschke, 2003,), Reischmann, 2003.

Recent research and the COVID 19 pandemic have expanded andragogy into the online world internationally, as evidenced by country and international organizations that foster the development of adult learning, research and collaboration in educating adults. New and expanding online instruction is fostered by national organizations, literacy organizations, academic journals and higher education institutions that are helping adults to achieve learning and skills that will contribute to individual economic improvement.

New learning resources and approaches are identified, such as finding that using collaborative tools like a wiki can encourage learners to become more self-directed, thereby enriching the classroom environment. Andragogy gives scope to self-directed learners and helps in designing and delivering the focused instructions. The methods used by andragogy can be used in different educational environments (e.g. adolescent education).

Internationally there are many academic journals, adult education organizations (including government agencies) and centers for adult learning housed in a plethora of international colleges and universities that are working to promote the field of adult learning, as well as adult learning opportunities in training, traditional classes and in online learning.

In academic fields, andrologists are those who practice and specialize in the field of andragogy. Andragologists have received a doctoral degree from an accredited university in Education (EdD) or a Philosophy (PhD) and focused their dissertation utilizing andragogy as a main component of their theoretical framework.

== Differences in learning: a pedagogy, andragogy and heutagogy continuum ==
In the 20th century, adult educators began to challenge the application of pedagogical theory and teacher-centered approaches to the teaching of adults. Unlike children, adult learners are not transmitted knowledge. Rather, the adult learner is an active participant in their learning. Adult students also are asked to actively plan their learning process to include identifying learning objectives and how they will be achieved. Knowles (1980) summarized the key characteristics of andragogy in this model: 1) independency or self-directedness 2) using past experiences to construct learning, 3) association with readiness to learn, and 4) changing education perspectives from subject-centered one to performance centered perspectives.

A new educational strategy has evolved in response to globalization that identifies learners as self-determined, especially in higher education and work-place settings: heutagogy, a process where students learn on their own with some guidance from the teacher. The motivation to learn comes from the students' interest in not only performing, but being recognized for their accomplishment (Akiyildiz, 2019). In addition, in heutagogy, learning is learner-centric - where the decisions relating to the learning process are managed by the student. Further, the student determines whether or not the learning objectives are met.

Differences between pedagogy, andragogy, and heutagogy include:

| | Pedagogy Children learning | Andragogy Adult learning | Heutagogy Self-directed learning |
|---|---|---|---|
| Learner | The learner is dependent on the instructor, the teacher schedules all the activities; determining how, when and where they should take place; Teacher is the one who is responsible for what is taught and how it is taught; Teacher evaluates the learning | The learner is self-directed and moves towards independence; Learner is responsible for the learning; Students are able to self-evaluate | The learner is self-directed; Learner is able to manage their own learning; The learner uses their own experiences and those of others |
| Learner's experience | There is little experience which could be gained from this kind of learning; Method is didactic | There is large quantity of experience gained; Method used is problem solving, discussion, service-learning | The learner is able to reflect on their experiences; They are able to use experiences of other learners |
| Readiness to learn | Standardized curriculum set which will be based on societal needs; Learning is a goal to move to the next level | Curriculum is more application based and it revolves around life experiences | Learning is self-determined; The learner is able to manage their own learning; Learning is driven by the potential to learn in new situations |
| Orientation to learning and role of instructor | Teachers support students in becoming learners and understanding learning needs | Adult learning is task or problem centered; Adults may be asked to explore their own effective learning strategies | The learner is self-directed; Learner is able to manage their own learning |
| Resources for learning | Standardized curriculum and resources; Teachers lead instructional methods | Resources maybe provided by instructors but adults use their own (and other students') experiences; Adult learners seek out additional resources | The learner is self-directed; The learner is able to manage their own learning; Instructors may provide some resources but the learner negotiates their own learning |
| Motivation | Motivation is by external pressure such as grading, class rank, completion of grade-levels | Motivation is driven by internal motivation. Includes self-actualization, self-confidence or recognition | Self-efficacy—The learner is self-directed; Learner is able to manage their own learning in new situations and in working with others |

== Critique ==
There is no consensus internationally on whether andragogy is a learning theory or a set of principles, characteristics or assumptions of adult learning. Knowles himself changed his position on whether andragogy applied only to adults and came to believe that "pedagogy-andragogy represents a continuum ranging from teacher-directed to student-directed learning and that both approaches are appropriate with children and adults, depending on the situation." Hanson (1996) argues that the difference in learning is not related to the age and stage of one's life, but instead related to individual characteristics and the differences in "context, culture and power" within different educational settings.

In another critique of Knowles' work, Knowles was not able to use one of his principles (Self-concept) with adult learners to the extent that he describes in his practices. In one course, Knowles appears to allow "near total freedom in learner determination of objectives" but still "intended" the students to choose from a list of 18 objectives on the syllabus. Self-concept can be critiqued not just from the instructor's point of view, but also from the student's point of view. Not all adult learners will know exactly what they want to learn in a course and may seek a more structured outline from an instructor. An instructor cannot assume that an adult will desire self-directed learning in every situation.

Kidd (1978) goes further by claiming that principles of learning have to be applied to lifelong development. He suggested that building a theory on adult learning would be meaningless, as there is no real basis for it. Jarvis even implies that andragogy would be more the result of an ideology than a scientific contribution to the comprehension of the learning processes. Knowles himself mentions that andragogy is a "model of assumptions about learning or a conceptual framework that serves as a basis for an emergent theory." There appears to be a lack of research on whether this framework of teaching and learning principles is more relevant to adult learners or if it is just a set of good practices that could be used for both children and adult learners.

The way adults learn is different from the pedagogical approach used to foster learning in K-12 settings. These learning differences are key and can be used to show that the six characteristics/principles of andragogy remain applicable when designing teaching and learning materials, in English as a Foreign Language (EFL), for example.

== See also ==
- Alternative pathways in education
- Autodidacticism – Independent education without the guidance of teachers
- Geragogy – Science of education of older adults
