= Gulf Publishing Company =

American international publishing and events business

- Status: Active
- Founded: 1916
- Founder: Ray L. Dudley
- Successor: John T. Royall
- Country of origin: United States
- Headquarters location: Houston, Texas
- Key people: John T. Royall (President and CEO); Andy McDowell (World Oil publisher); Catherine Watkins (Hydrocarbon Processing publisher); Brian Nessen (Pipeline & Gas Journal publisher)
- Publication types: Magazines
- Nonfiction topics: Petroleum industry
- Official website: www.gulfpub.com

Gulf Publishing Company is an international publishing and events business dedicated to the hydrocarbon energy sector. In mid-2018 it rebranded as Gulf Energy Information. Founded in 1916 by Ray Lofton Dudley, Gulf Energy Information produces and distributes publications in print and web formats, online news, webcasts and databases; hosts conferences and events designed for the energy industry. The company was a subsidiary of Euromoney Institutional Investor from 2001 until a 2016 management buyout by CEO John Royall and Texas investors. The business and strategy publication Petroleum Economist also transferred to the company in May 2016. In mid-2017 the company acquired 109-year old Oildom Publishing.

The company's flagship magazines, World Oil, Hydrocarbon Processing, Pipeline & Gas Journal, and the Petroleum Economist are published monthly. Gulf is headquartered in Houston, Texas, with sales staff and columnists around the world, due to expansion efforts by William G. Dudley, Sr. The Petroleum Economist publishing and map cartography staff are based in London, UK. Gulf Energy Info's Data Services staff support on-line Energy Web Atlas energy data visualization, and Construction Boxscore downstream project database, from Houston, London and Mumbai.

Since 1916 World Oil has covered the upstream oil and gas industry for conventional, shale, offshore, exploration and production technology in oil and gas.

Since 1922, Hydrocarbon Processing has provided job-relevant information to technical staff, operations, maintenance and management in petroleum refining, gas processing facilities, petrochemical and engineer/constructor companies throughout the world. Bi-monthly supplement Gas Processing & LNG was added in 2012.

Since 1934, the Petroleum Economist has written about oil, its politics and economics - explained some of the industry's biggest disruptions: such as the 1973 oil crisis, the Gulf Wars, the rise of China, the Arab uprisings, and the more recent supply-side shocks from North America's unconventional energy sector.

Since 1859, Pipeline & Gas Journal has been the essential resource for technology and trends in the midstream industry; written and edited to be of service to those involved in moving, marketing and managing hydrocarbons from wellheads to ultimate consumers.

The company formerly published trade books, but spun off the division as TaylorWilson (now part of Taylor Trade) in 2000; sold its professional book list to Elsevier in 2013.
