= Aleksandra Faust =

Serbian-American AI researcher and technology executive

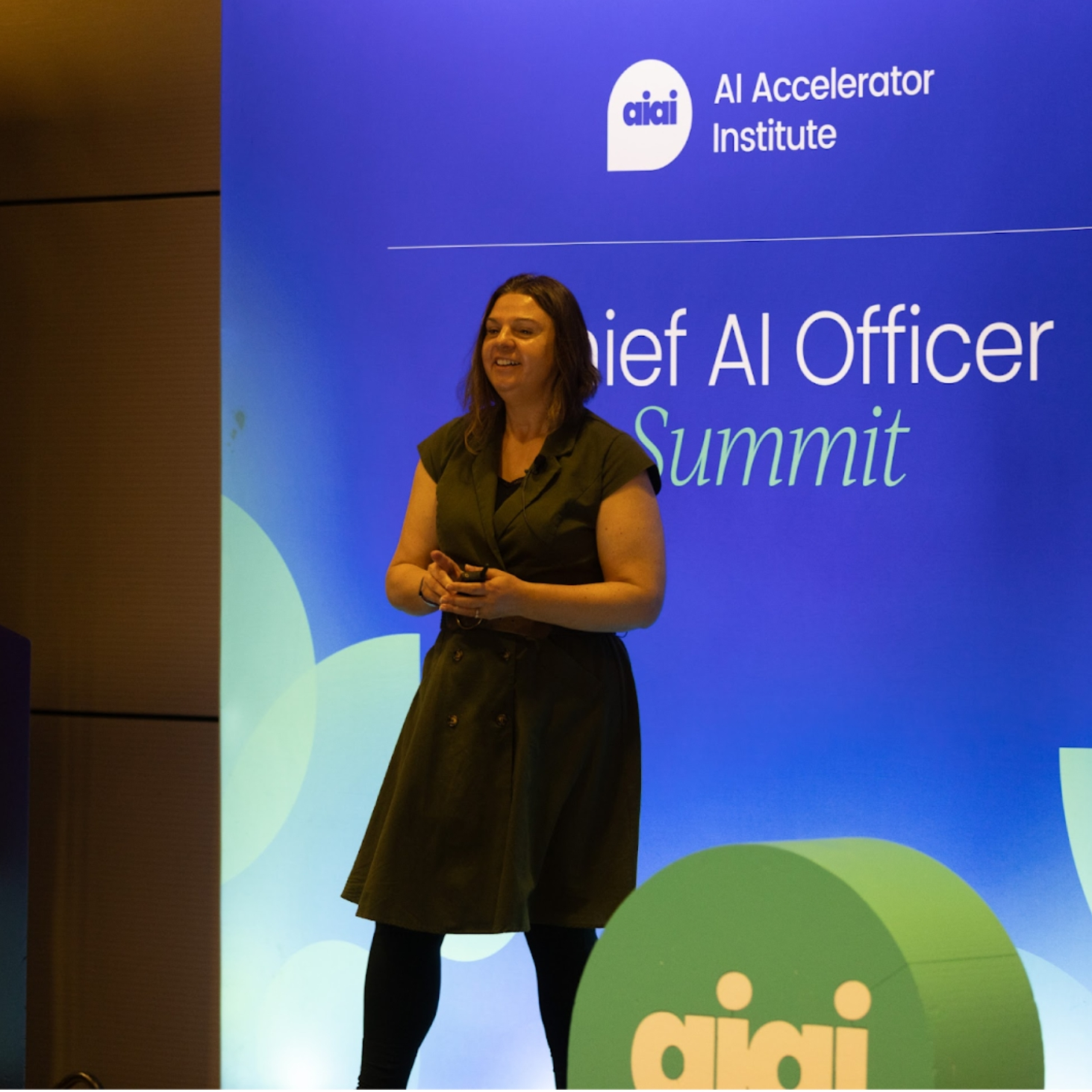
- Faust speaking at the Chief AI Officer Summit in Santa Clara, California, in 2025
- Born: Belgrade, Serbia
- Education: University of New Mexico (PhD); University of Illinois Urbana-Champaign (MS); University of Belgrade (BS)
- Scientific career
- Fields: Artificial Intelligence, Robotics
- Workplaces: Genesis Molecular AI, Google DeepMind, Google Brain, Waymo, Sandia National Laboratories
- Thesis: Reinforcement Learning and Planning for Preference Balancing Tasks (2014)
- Doctoral advisor: Lydia Tapia
- Website: https://afaust.info

Aleksandra Faust is a Serbian-American computer scientist who is the Chief AI officer at Genesis Molecular AI. Previously, she served as a Research Director at Google DeepMind, and a Principal Investigator at Sandia National Laboratories.

== Education ==
Faust received her Bachelor of Science in Mathematics and Computer Science from the University of Belgrade and her Master of Science in Computer Science from the University of Illinois at Urbana-Champaign in 2004. In 2014, Faust completed her Ph.D. in Computer Science at the University of New Mexico under the supervision of Lydia Tapia.

== Career ==
Faust was a Senior R&D Engineer at Sandia National Laboratories (2006–2015). She subsequently joined Waymo (Google's self-driving car project) in 2015, focusing on machine learning for motion planning.

In 2017, Faust joined Google Brain, eventually rising to Director of Research at Google DeepMind, where she led scalable autonomy and reinforcement learning research. In 2020, she received the IEEE Early Career Award in Robotics and Automation.

In June 2025, Faust was appointed Chief AI Officer of Genesis Molecular AI (formerly Genesis Therapeutics). In October 2025, she and her team released the technical report for the "Pearl" foundation model for atomic placement in biomolecular structures, reportedly the first model that outperforms AlphaFold 3.

=== Automated Reinforcement Learning (AutoRL) ===
Faust co-authored the paper that founded Automated Reinforcement Learning (AutoRL), a term her research is credited with coining. AutoRL automates the design of the learning agents themselves. She co-authored the field's first survey, and served as the Program Chair for the AutoML conference in 2023.

=== Robotics and Motion Planning ===
In robotics, Faust bridges the gap between sensing, motion planning, and control using machine learning. She created "PRM-RL," a method that combines sampling-based planning with reinforcement learning to enable long-range autonomous navigation, winning the Best Paper in Service Robotics award at ICRA 2018.

Faust was also an early advocate for generalist robot models capable of navigating diverse physical spaces without retraining. She established the theoretical foundations for this generalization as well as self-supervised methods for a learning-based robotics stack without computationally expensive methods. She later expanded this approach to hardware-software co-design, characterizing dependencies between sensors, compute, and machine learning models. This interdisciplinary work earned the Best of IEEE Computer Architecture Letters runner-up award (2020) and an IEEE Micro Top Picks Honorable Mention (2023). Her contributions to the field were recognized with the IEEE Early Career Award in Robotics and Automation in 2020.

=== Generative AI and Autonomous Agents ===
Faust led the development of Web Agents, recognized as the first fully autonomous, open-ended task agents on the web. This technology was integrated into Google Assistant. To measure industry progress, Faust co-authored "Levels of AGI," a framework operationalizing the path to artificial general intelligence (AGI). The framework has been discussed in media outlets including Bloomberg News, The Economist, and Forbes.

== Awards and honors ==
- Fellow of the IEEE, 2026 "for contributions to technical leadership in scalable learning-based autonomy and foundation models"
- 50 Women in Robotics you need to know about, Women in Robotics (2023)
- Best Paper of IEEE Computer Architecture Letters runner-up (2020)
- IEEE Early Career Award in Robotics and Automation (2020)
- ICRA Best Paper in Service Robotics (2018)

=== Speaking engagements ===
Faust was the 2025 keynote speaker at the IAEA's Emerging Technologies Workshop and a plenary panel at World Summit AI. She has served as a panelist for the National Academy of Sciences and addressed 15,000 attendees as a plenary speaker at the Society of Women Engineers WE17 conference.
