= Nancy M. Amato =

American computer scientist

Nancy Amato
- Born: Nancy Marie Amato; Portland, Oregon, US
- Education: Stanford University (BS); University of California, Berkeley (MS); University of Illinois at Urbana-Champaign (PhD)
- Known for: Motion planning Computational biology Computational geometry Parallel computing Animation; Distributed computing Parallel algorithms Performance modeling and optimization
- Awards: IEEE Fellow (2010); AAAI Fellow (2018); ACM Fellow (2015)
- Scientific career
- Fields: Computer Science
- Institutions: Texas A&M University; University of Illinois at Urbana-Champaign
- Thesis: Reversing trains : a turn of the century sorting problem (1988)
- Doctoral advisor: Franco P. Preparata
- Doctoral students: Lydia Tapia
- Website: cs.illinois.edu/directory/profile/namato engineering.tamu.edu/cse/profiles/namato.html

Nancy Marie Amato is an American computer scientist noted for her research on the algorithmic foundations of motion planning, computational biology, computational geometry and parallel computing. Amato is the Abel Bliss Professor of Engineering and Head of the Department of Computer Science at the University of Illinois at Urbana-Champaign. Amato is noted for her leadership in broadening participation in computing, and is currently a member of the steering committee of CRA-WP (formerly known as CRA-W), of which she has been a member of the board since 2000.

== Education ==
Amato received both a Bachelor of Arts degree in Economics and a Bachelor of Science degree in Mathematical Sciences from Stanford University in 1986. She received an MS in Computer Science from the University of California, Berkeley in 1988, with advisor Manuel Blum. In 1995, she received a PhD in computer science from the University of Illinois at Urbana-Champaign under advisor Franco P. Preparata for her thesis "Parallel Algorithms for Convex Hulls and Proximity Problems".

== Career and research ==
She joined the Department of Computer Science at Texas A&M University as an assistant professor in 1995. She was promoted to associate professor in 2000, to professor in 2004, and to Unocal professor in 2011.

In July 2018, Amato was named the next head of the Department of Computer Science at the University of Illinois at Urbana-Champaign, starting in January 2019.

Amato has several notable results. Her paper on probabilistic roadmap methods (PRMs) is one of the most important papers on PRM. It describes the first PRM variant that does not use uniform sampling in the robot's configuration space. She wrote a seminal paper with one of her students that shows how the PRM methodology can be applied to protein motions, and in particular protein folding. This approach has opened up a new research area in computational biology. This result opens up a rich new set of applications for this technique in computational biology. Another paper she wrote with her students represents a major advance by showing how global energy landscape statistics, such as relative folding rates and population kinetics, can be computed for proteins from the approximate landscapes computed by Amato's PRM-based method. In another paper, she and a student introduced a novel technique, approximate convex decomposition (ACD), for partitioning a polyhedron into approximately convex pieces. Amato also co-leads the STAPL project with her husband Lawrence Rauchwerger, who is also a computer scientist on the faculty at the University of Illinois at Urbana-Champaign. STAPL is a parallel C++ library.

=== Awards and honors ===
Her notable awards include:

- AAAS Fellow in 2024
- AAAI Fellow in 2018
- ACM Fellow in 2015
- IEEE Fellow in 2010 "for contributions to the algorithmic foundations of motion planning in robotics and computational biology."
- A. Nico Habermann Award from the Computing Research Association in 2014
- AAAS Fellow 2013 for contributions to the algorithmic foundations of motion planning, computational biology, computational geometry, and parallel computing.
- Hewlett-Packard/Harriett B. Rigas Award, 2013.
- ACM Distinguished Member in 2012
