= University of Belgrade =

University in Belgrade, Serbia

Coordinates: 44°49′07″N 20°27′27″E

- Универзитет у Београду; Univerzitet u Beogradu
- Latin: Universitas Belgradensis
- Former names: Velika škola or Grande école 1808–1905
- Type: Public
- Established: 1808; 218 years ago
- Academic affiliations: European University Association; Erasmus; DAAD; AUF; DRC
- Budget: din. 789.291 million €6.7 million (2023, planned)
- Rector: Vladan Đokić
- Academic staff: 4,399 (2024–25)
- Administrative staff: 3,279 (2024–25)
- Students: 94,425 (2024–25)
- Undergraduates: 64,412 (2024–25)
- Postgraduates: 21,329 (2024–25)
- Doctoral students: 7,491 (2024–25)
- Location: Belgrade, Serbia
- Campus: Urban
- Colors: Pantone 289 C
- Website: www.bg.ac.rs

The University of Belgrade (Serbian: Универзитет у Београду / Univerzitet u Beogradu) is a public research university in Belgrade, Serbia. It is the oldest and largest modern university in Serbia.

Founded in 1808 as the Belgrade Higher School in revolutionary Serbia, it merged with the Kragujevac-based departments by 1838 to form a single university. The university has around 59,600 enrolled students and over 4,600 academic staff members. Since its founding, the university has educated more than 378,000 bachelors, approximately 25,100 master's, 29,000 specialists, and 14,670 doctors. The university comprises 31 faculties, 12 research institutes, the university library, and 9 university centres. The faculties are organized into four groups: social sciences and humanities; medical sciences; natural sciences and mathematics; and technological sciences.

== History ==
=== 19th century ===
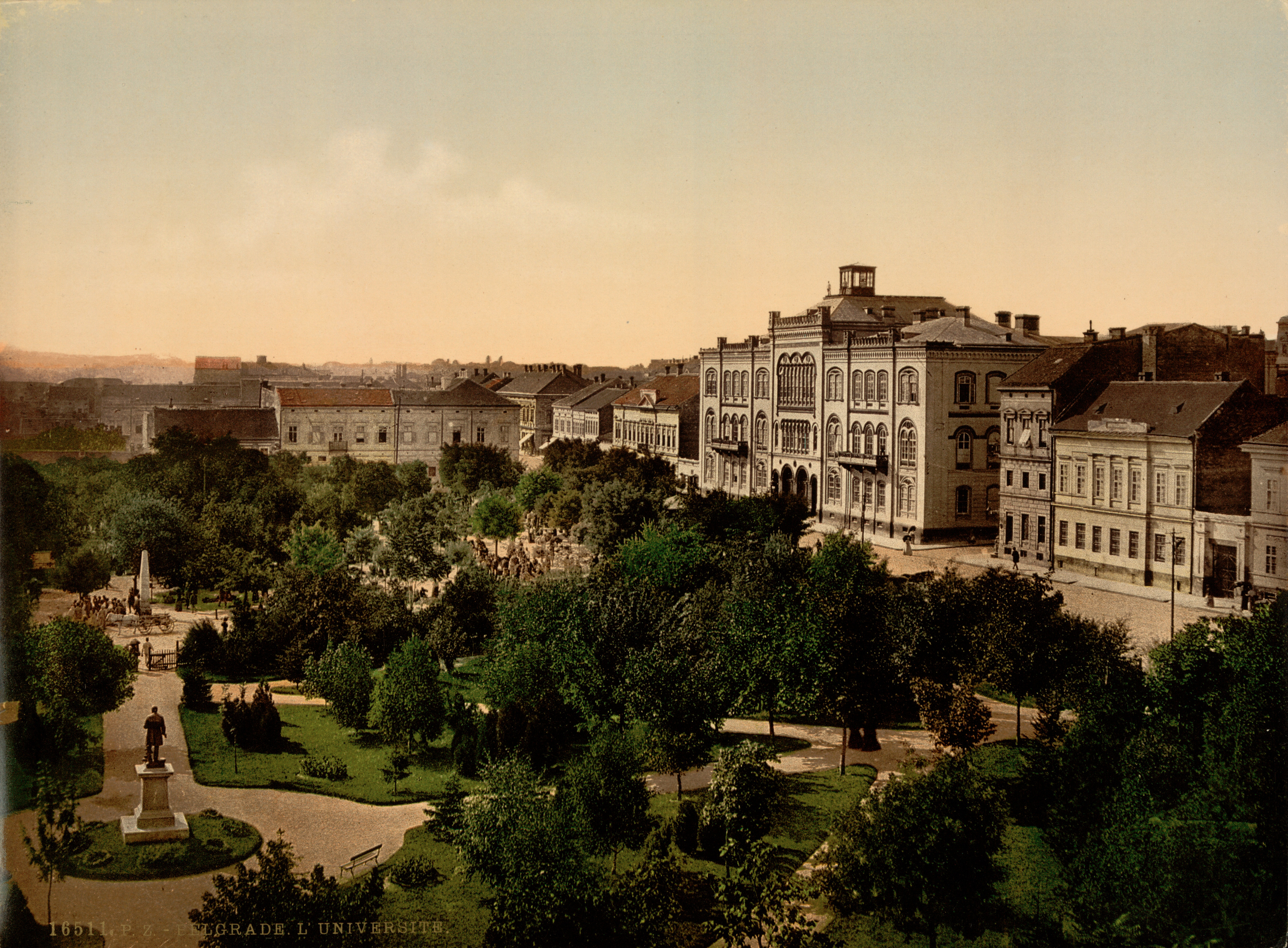
University of Belgrade in 1890

The predecessor to the University of Belgrade was established in 1808 as the Belgrade Higher School by Dositej Obradović, a key Serbian figure in the Age of Enlightenment. It was the highest ranking educational institution in Serbia between 1808 and 1905, as the first Higher School (1808–1813), the Belgrade Lyceum (Serbian: Београдски Лицеј / Beogradski Licej; 1838–1863), and the second Higher School (1863–1905). It was initially located at the Princess Ljubica's Residence building and then moved to another significant site in Belgrade, the Captain Miša’s Mansion, which today serves as the university's seat.

=== 20th century ===
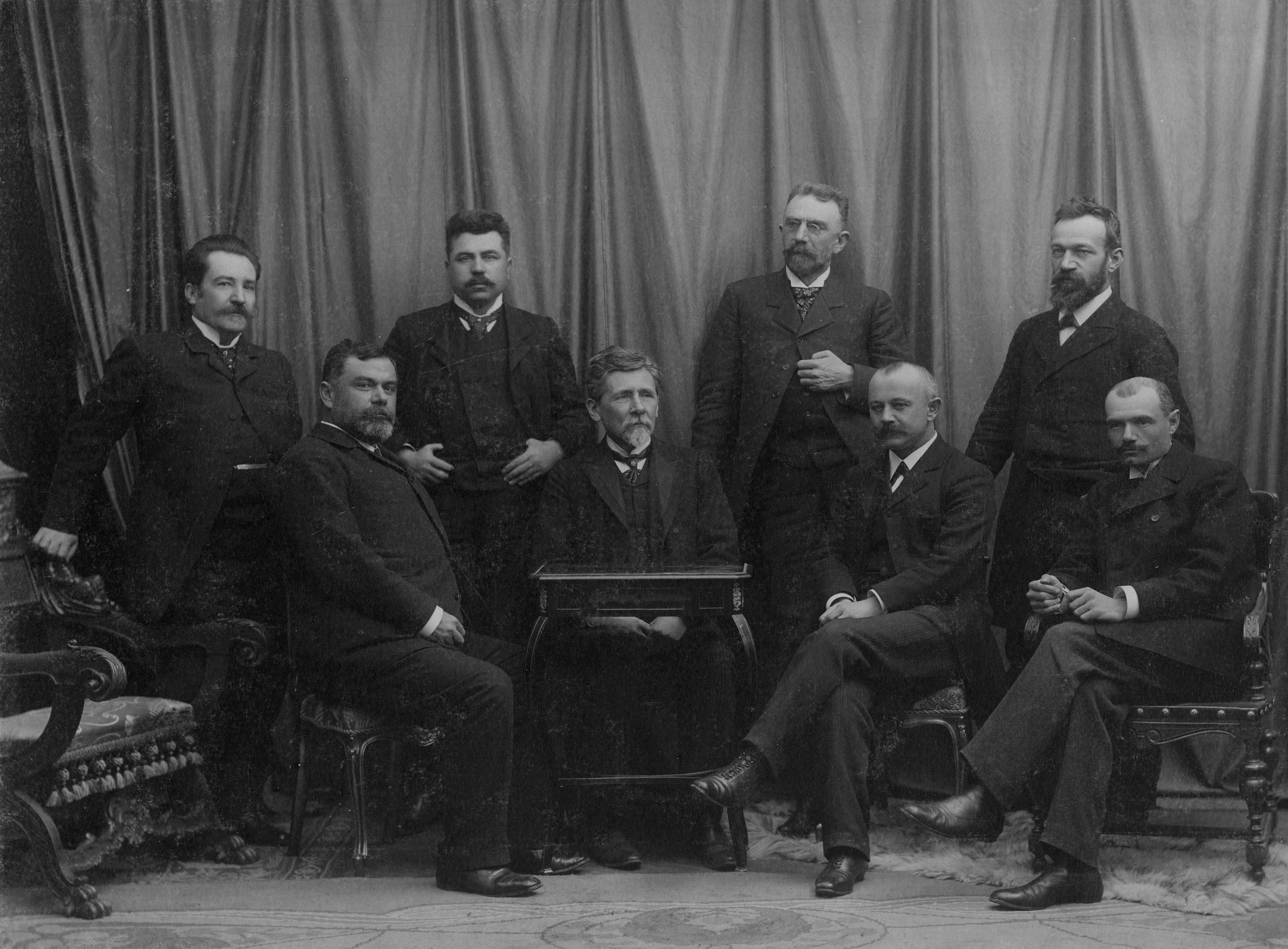
First professors of the University of Belgrade (1905).

The University of Belgrade witnessed a massive growth and expansion in the years before the Second World War and especially after the founding of the second Yugoslavia. The first woman graduated from the University of Belgrade's Law School in 1914.

In the 1960s and 70s, the university developed into a remarkable regional and international educational institution. Many students from other countries were trained there. Up to 40,000 students from Africa alone studied at the University of Belgrade during the existence of the SFR Yugoslavia. In the socialist Yugoslavia, the university was expanded, but it was also exposed to state and ideological influence. It has also been the driving force for the establishment of almost all other universities in today's Serbia, Montenegro, North Macedonia and several universities in Bosnia and Herzegovina.

In 1968, its students organized the first mass protest in post-World War II Yugoslavia.

In the early 1990s the quality of university programs deteriorated as a consequence of the political instability in the country and the subsequent wars of Yugoslavia. There was a lack of financial resources and the quality dropped significantly. During the Milošević government in Serbia, the university had to face external political pressure and the lack of academic and administrative autonomy.

In the mid-1990s, the University of Belgrade became an internationally recognized center of the political opposition in Serbia. Massive anti-government protests were staged by the Belgrade students and professors. The university's student organizations (especially "Otpor!") significantly contributed to overthrowing the government.

=== 21st century ===
The university has become a signatory of the Bologna declaration. Being one of Europe's largest universities with an enrollment of nearly 90,000 students, the university broadly cooperates with international academic institutions and is involved in countless bilateral and multilateral academic projects.

== Campus ==
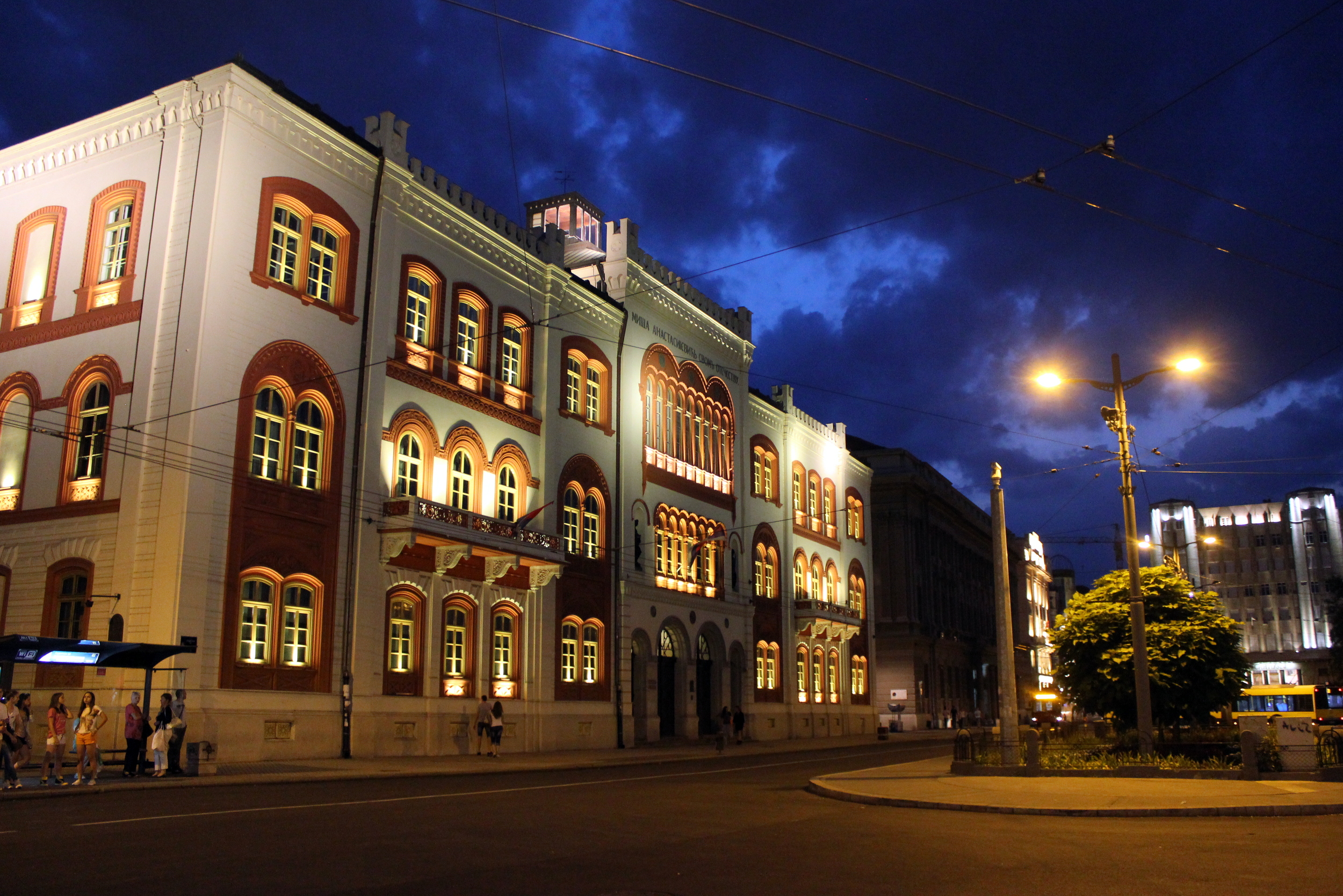
Administration and governance building (included in Serbia's register of most important historic buildings)

Having developed with the city in the 19th century, a number of the university buildings are an important part of Belgrade’s architecture and cultural heritage. Former sites include today's Museum of Vuk and Dositej and Princess Ljubica's Residence buildings, both of them being recognized as Belgrade's topmost historic buildings. The historical Subotica Law School (1920-1941) was also a part of the University of Belgrade. Some of the post-World War II facilities were built in the brutalist style. The university has sites throughout the city, with the two major campuses, one next to the Prince Michael Street at Studentski Trg and the other on King Alexandar Boulevard. It has eleven dormitories scattered throughout the city's urban neighborhoods for 11,340 students, including one dormitory complex in New Belgrade. Many of the schools have separate buildings at various locations in Belgrade. The university also owns several endowment buildings in the downtown district, most of them being built in the 19th and early 20th century.

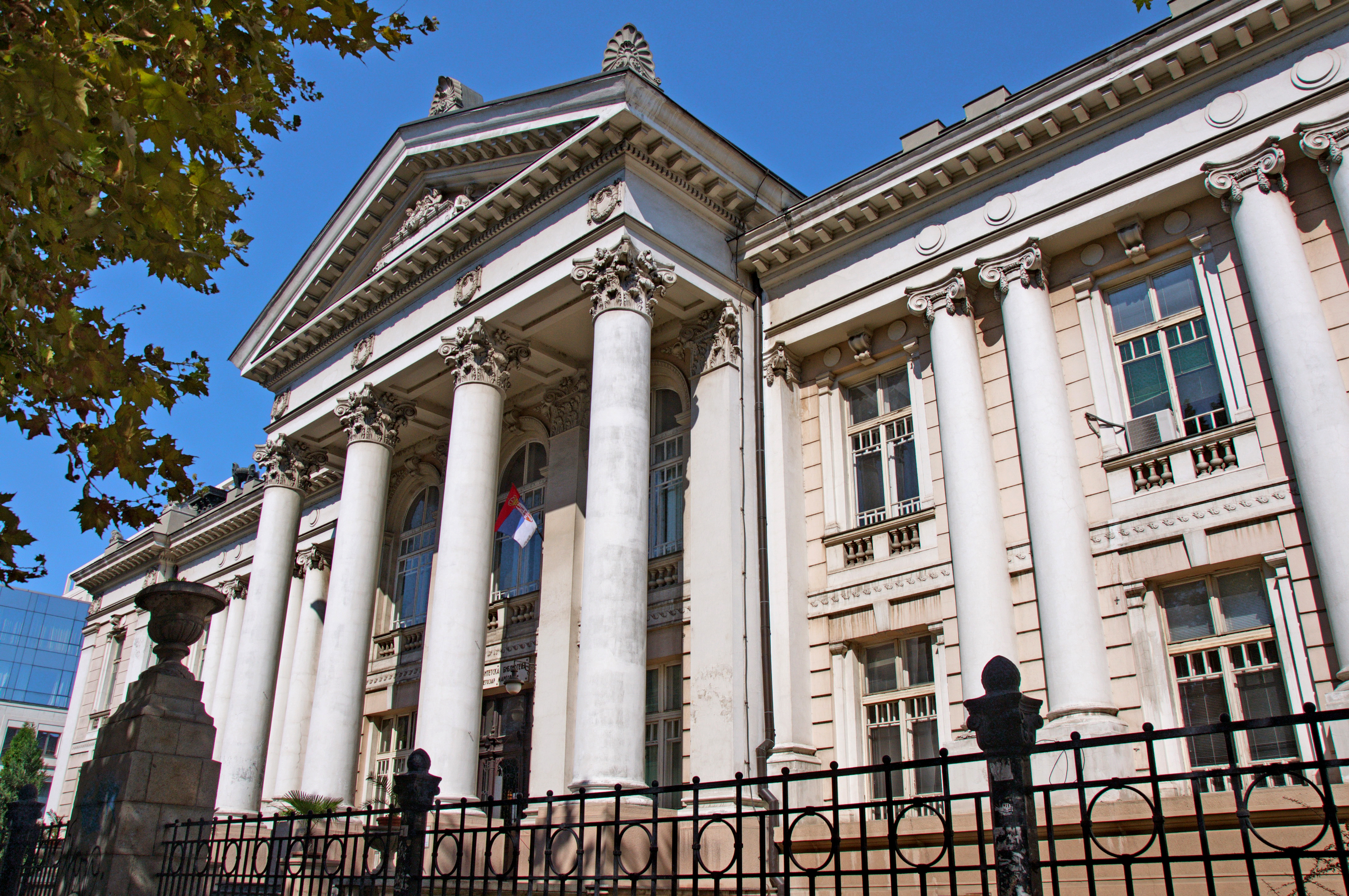
The Belgrade University Library, a Carnegie library, with over 1.5 million items

The central administrative building, Faculty of Philology and Faculty of Philosophy are located at Studentski Trg. The Faculty of Biology, Faculty of Geography, Faculty of Mathematics, Faculty for Physical Chemistry, Faculty of Physics and Faculty of Chemistry are situated in one building at Studentski Trg as well. The University Library, Law School, Faculty of Architecture, Faculty of Civil Engineering, Faculty of Electrical Engineering, Faculty of Mechanical Engineering are situated at the King Alexandar Boulevard campus.

Other major academic sites include the School of Economics building near the downtown district, the Faculty of Orthodox Theology building at Bogoslovija (Palilula neighborhood), the Teachers’ Training Faculty building in the Savski Venac municipality, the Faculty of Security Studies building in the Vračar neighborhood, and the Faculty for Special Education and Rehabilitation building in the Dorćol neighborhood. The School of Medicine and School of Dental Medicine share a building near the Karađorđev Park, next to several hospitals. Medical teaching facilities, such as the University Hospital Center or Institute of Mental Health are on other locations within the city. The Faculty of Agriculture is situated alongside the Zemun City Park and it operates the Radmilovac experimental farm in Grocka. The Faculty of Political Sciences and Faculty of Organizational Sciences are situated close to each other in the same street of the Voždovac neighborhood.

== Organization and administration ==
The University of Belgrade is governed by the 44-member University Senate elected for a three-year term. The senate is composed of the rector, 4 vice-rectors, 31 deans, 4 presidents of the faculty Group Councils and 4 directors of scientific institutes. 8 student-representatives with a one-year term elected by the university's Student Parliament participate in the work of the Senate. The rector provides governance and represents the university externally.

The University Council is a 31-member managing body. The university entrusts 21 members, 5 are appointed by the Serbian government and 5 elected by the university's Student Parliament. The University Council has its president (chairperson) and vice president. In addition to these bodies, the university has advisory academic councils and professional boards, appointed to adopt decisions and state their opinion on the election of teaching staff.

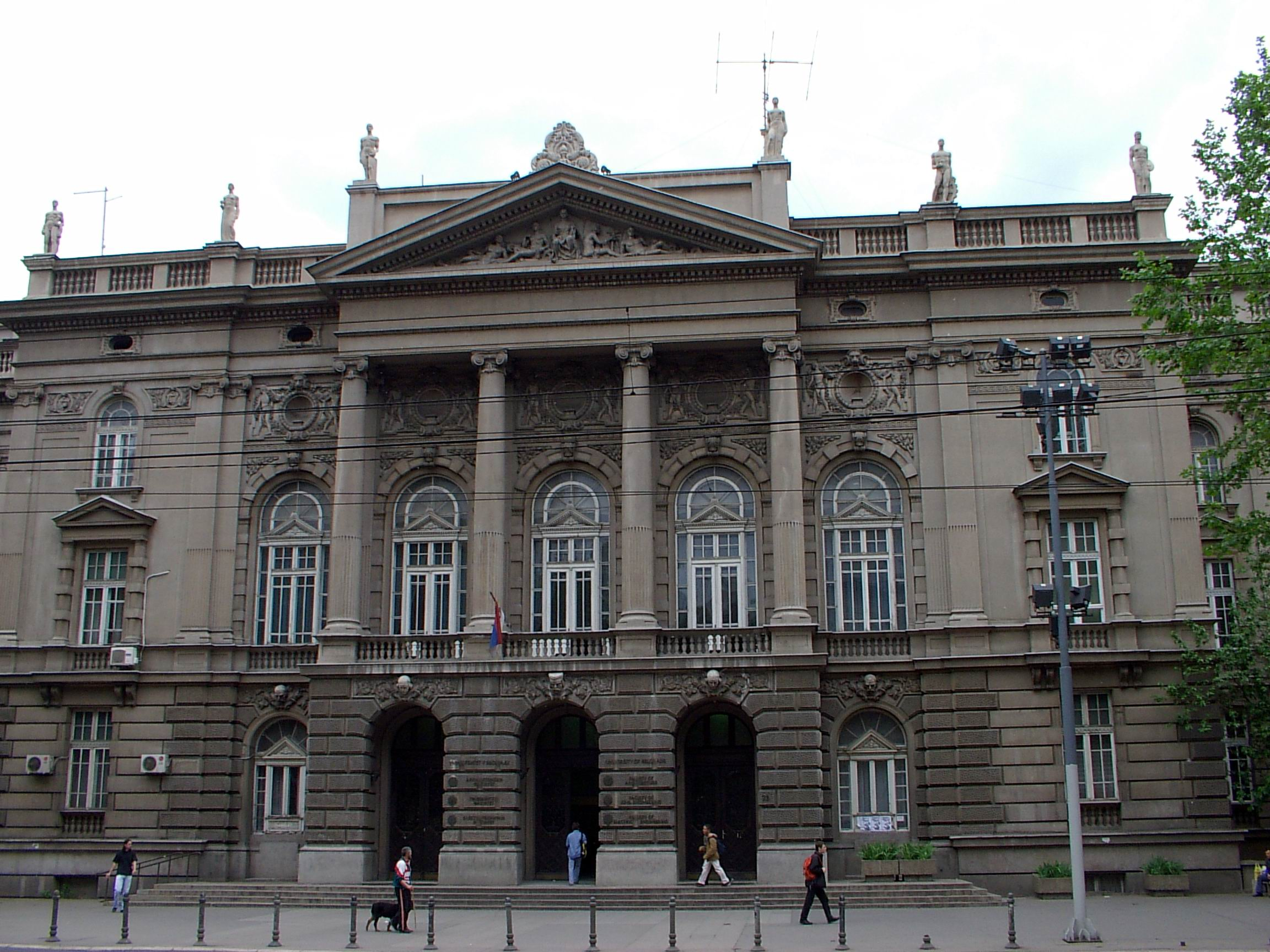
Faculty of Technical Sciences

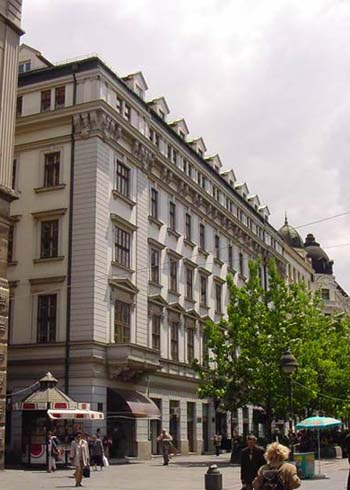
Faculty of Philology, view from Prince Michael Street

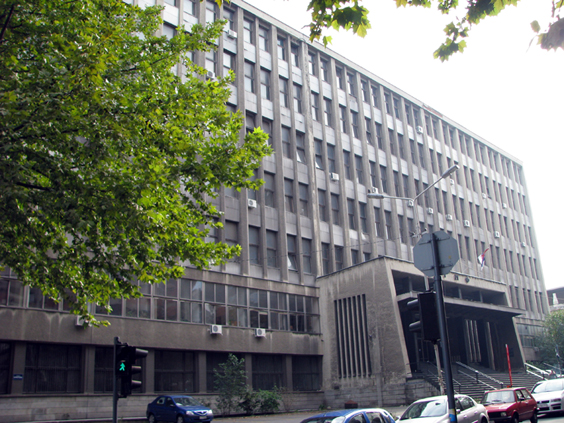
Faculty of Technology and Metallurgy

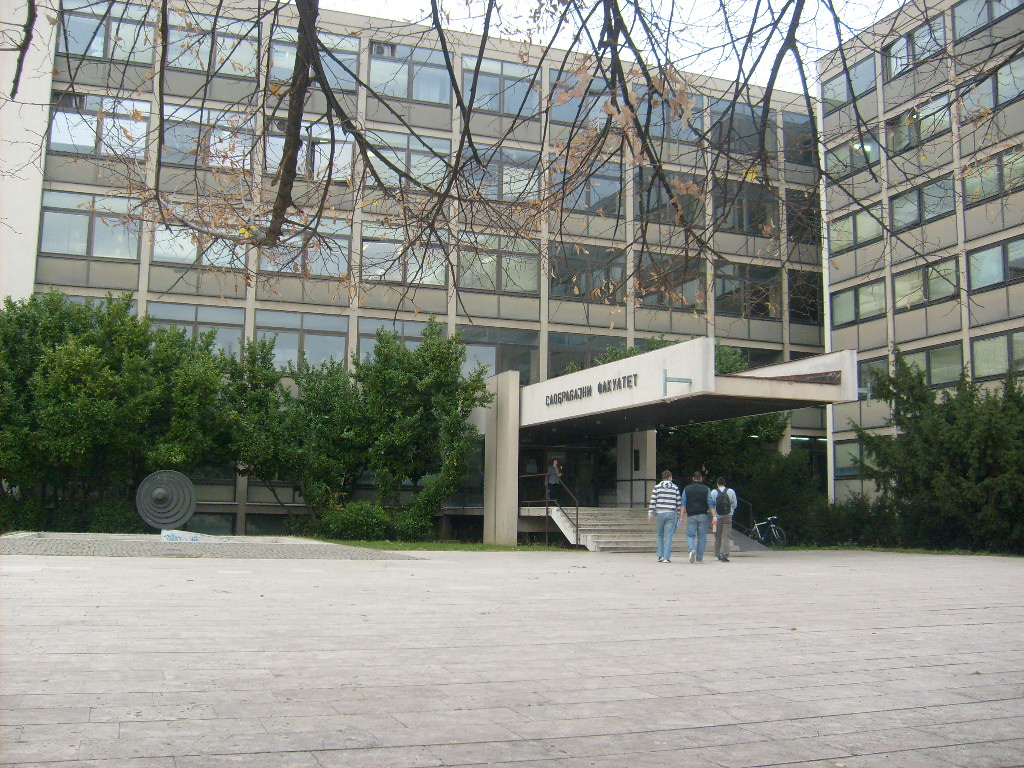
Faculty of Transport and Traffic Engineering

=== Faculties ===
The university is divided into 31 faculties, including (with data about academic staff and number of students as of 2023–24 school year):

Faculty	Location	Academic staff	Students
Law	Belgrade	101	7,910
Philology	Belgrade	309	6,959
Organizational Sciences	Belgrade	186	6,835
Economics	Belgrade	116	6,777
Medicine	Belgrade	724	6,092
Electrical Engineering	Belgrade	168	5,335
Mechanical Engineering	Belgrade	203	4,222
Philosophy	Belgrade	279	4,114
Political Sciences	Belgrade	115	3,770
Agriculture	Belgrade	288	3,544
Pharmacy	Belgrade	166	2,899
Civil Engineering	Belgrade	149	2,703
Security Studies	Belgrade	40	2,377
Mathematics	Belgrade	155	2,198
Transport and Traffic Engineering	Belgrade	149	2,168
Special Education and Rehabilitation	Belgrade	94	2,157
Pedagogy	Belgrade	106	1,963
Technology and Metallurgy	Belgrade	150	1,926
Biology	Belgrade	108	1,819
Architecture	Belgrade	140	1,756
Dentistry	Belgrade	137	1,677
Veterinary Medicine	Belgrade	133	1,578
Sport and Physical Education	Belgrade	60	1,477
Eastern Orthodox Theology	Belgrade	40	1,443
Geography	Belgrade	83	1,291
Forestry	Belgrade	103	1,287
Mining and Geology	Belgrade	246	1,070
Chemistry	Belgrade	83	960
Physics	Belgrade	50	536
Technical	Bor	87	530
Physical Chemistry	Belgrade	44	480
Interdisciplinary Studies	Belgrade	-	299
Total		4,720	89,622

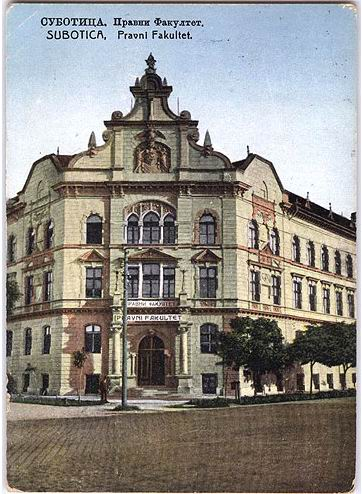
University of Belgrade's Law School at Subotica that existed from 1920 - 1941

=== Research institutes ===
- Institute for Applied Nuclear Energy
- Institute for Chemistry, Technology and Metallurgy
- Institute of History
- Institute for Medical Research
- Institute for Molecular Genetics and Genetic Engineering
- Institute for Multidisciplinary Research
- Institute for Philosophy and Social Theory
- Institute of Physics
- Mihajlo Pupin Institute
- Nikola Tesla Institute of Electrical Engineering
- Siniša Stanković Institute for Biological Research
- Vinča Nuclear Institute

=== Centers ===
- Information Center
- Computer Center
- Serbian-Japanese Center for Scientific Simulations
- Center for Career Development
- Center for Strategic Management
- Center for Technology Transfer
- Center for Students with Disabilities
- Center for Quality Assurance
- Center for Lifelong Learning

== Academics ==
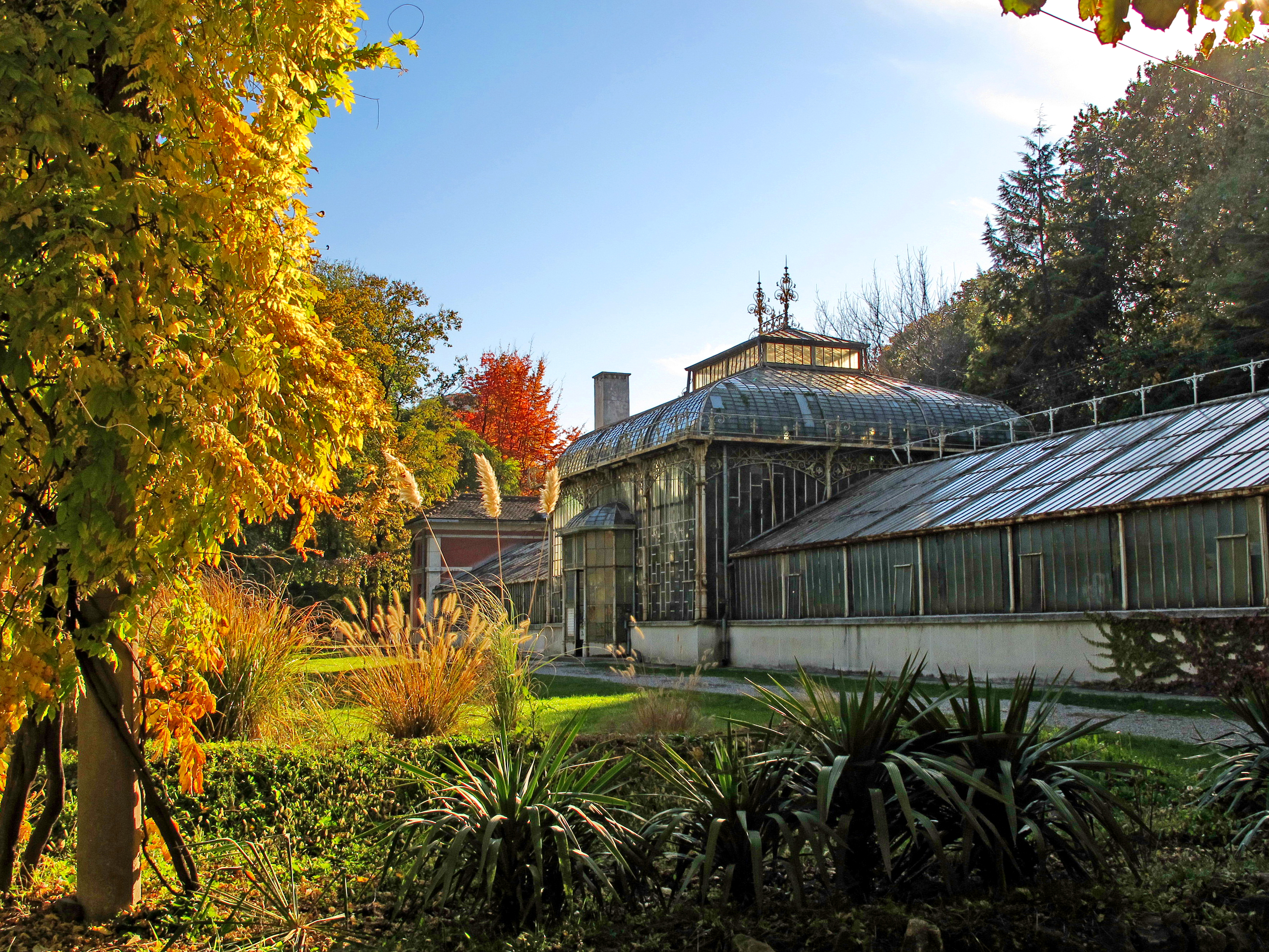
University of Belgrade's Botanical Garden

The Belgrade Law School, established in 1808, is a regional leader in legal education and one of the largest law schools in the Balkans. Its law education prepares students for working in law practice, business, public service and teaching. The Residence of Princess Ljubica as well as the Captain Miša Mansion once used to be home to this educational institution when it was within the Belgrade Higher School. Since its founding, it has educated almost 50,000 law graduates, around 1,200 magistri iuris and 830 doctores iuris, as well as hundreds of specialists in various areas. Many Faculty of Law alumni have become recognized experts and scholars in all branches of law, law professors and high ranking government officials.

The Law School's historic building, constructed by Serbian architect Petar Bajalović in 1941, comprises about 12,000 square metres (130,000 sq ft) of space. All the law schools established subsequently in Serbia (Subotica, Novi Sad, Pristina, Niš, Kragujevac), Montenegro (Podgorica), and in other parts of the former Yugoslavia (Sarajevo, Skopje) were formed from the University of Belgrade Faculty of Law as a core.

Initially established in 1937, the Faculty of Economics was the first centre of higher education dedicated to the study of economics in the Kingdom of Yugoslavia. Its curriculum includes courses in economic analysis and policy; marketing; accounting, auditing and financial management; trade and commerce; finance, banking and insurance; tourism and hotel industry; statistics and informatics; management and international economics and foreign trade.

The Faculty of Philosophy is one of the oldest institutions of higher education in Serbia, founded in the early 19th century. It employs a staff of 255 teachers and has approximately 6,000 undergraduate and graduate students within nine departments.

The Faculty of Philology trains and educates its students in the academic study or practice in linguistics and philology. The study of philology was established in Belgrade within the Belgrade Higher School's Department of Philosophy in 1808. Today, the school offers courses in philology, linguistics and literature in dozens of languages. The school is divided into departments, which possess their own libraries, it operates several research centers and publishes a number of periodical publications.

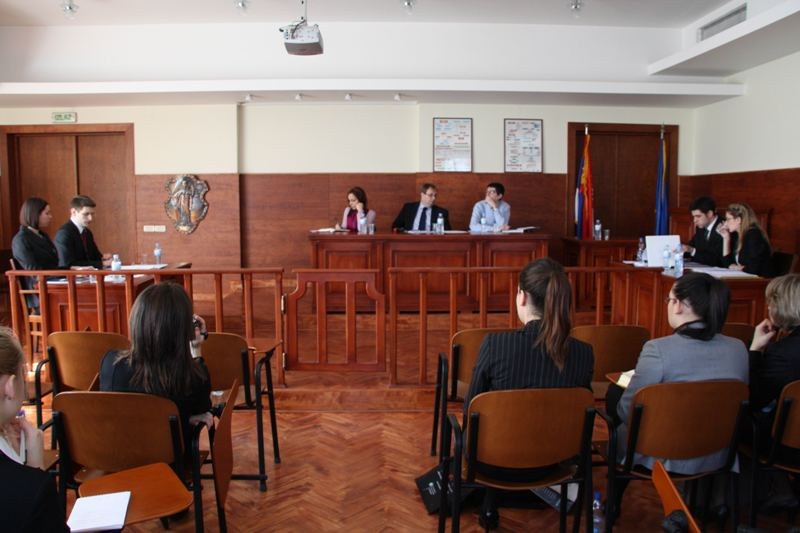
Moot Court at the Belgrade Law School

The Faculty of Electrical Engineering is also an important part of the university. The first lecture on electrical engineering was held in 1894. Professor Stevan Marković was the first lecturer and founder of the Engineering Department within the Belgrade Higher School. Marković also established the first Serbian electrical engineering laboratory in 1898. Today, the school is divided into a number of departments, offering a wide range of electrical engineering programs.

The Belgrade Medical School was established in 1920 and more than 30,000 students graduated from this institution, including circa 850 international students. The School of Medicine is composed of 40 departments with over 200 professorships. The school offers an extensive number of academic courses, including specialization practice within a network of hospitals, institutes and medical clinics.

The Faculty of Stomatology (Belgrade Dental School) was established in 1948. The first head of the newly founded faculty was Dr. Aleksandar Djordjevic, Professor of the Faculty of Medicine at that time. In organizing and teaching the students of dentistry after its establishment, and long after, many teachers of the Faculty of Medicine and Veterinary Medicine and Faculty of Pharmacy have contributed a lot. The Faculty of Stomatology is composed of 8 teaching and scientific and healthcare organizational units.

Under the umbrella of the humanities faculty, the Faculty of Security Studies has its roots in the Institute for National Defense of the Natural Sciences and Mathematics Faculty, University of Belgrade. In 1978, this institute evolved into the free-standing Faculty of People's Defense, which was renamed several times before becoming the Faculty of Security Studies in May 2006. The Faculty of Security Studies focuses on all aspects of security studies, human and social resources, defense, civil defense and environmental protection, offering professional training, undergraduate and postgraduate degrees.

== Rankings ==
University rankings

Global – Overall
- ARWU World: 401–500 (2025)
- CWUR World: 387 (2025)
- QS World: 761-771 (2026)
- THE World: 1001–1200 (2026)
- USNWR Global: 460 (2025)

Regional – Overall
- QS Emerging Europe and Central Asia: 51 (2022)

On Shanghai Ranking (ARWU), the University of Belgrade ranks between 401st and 500th place, according to the 2025 global ranking. In 2025, it ranked between 76th and 100th place in Metallurgical Engineering it also ranked between 101st and 150th in Food Science & Technology and Veterinary Sciences. In 2025 on USNWR, the University of Belgrade ranked 460th globally. Out of all subjects on USNWR the University of Belgrade it was best ranked in Cardiac and Cardiovascular Systems being 61st in the world.

== Student life ==
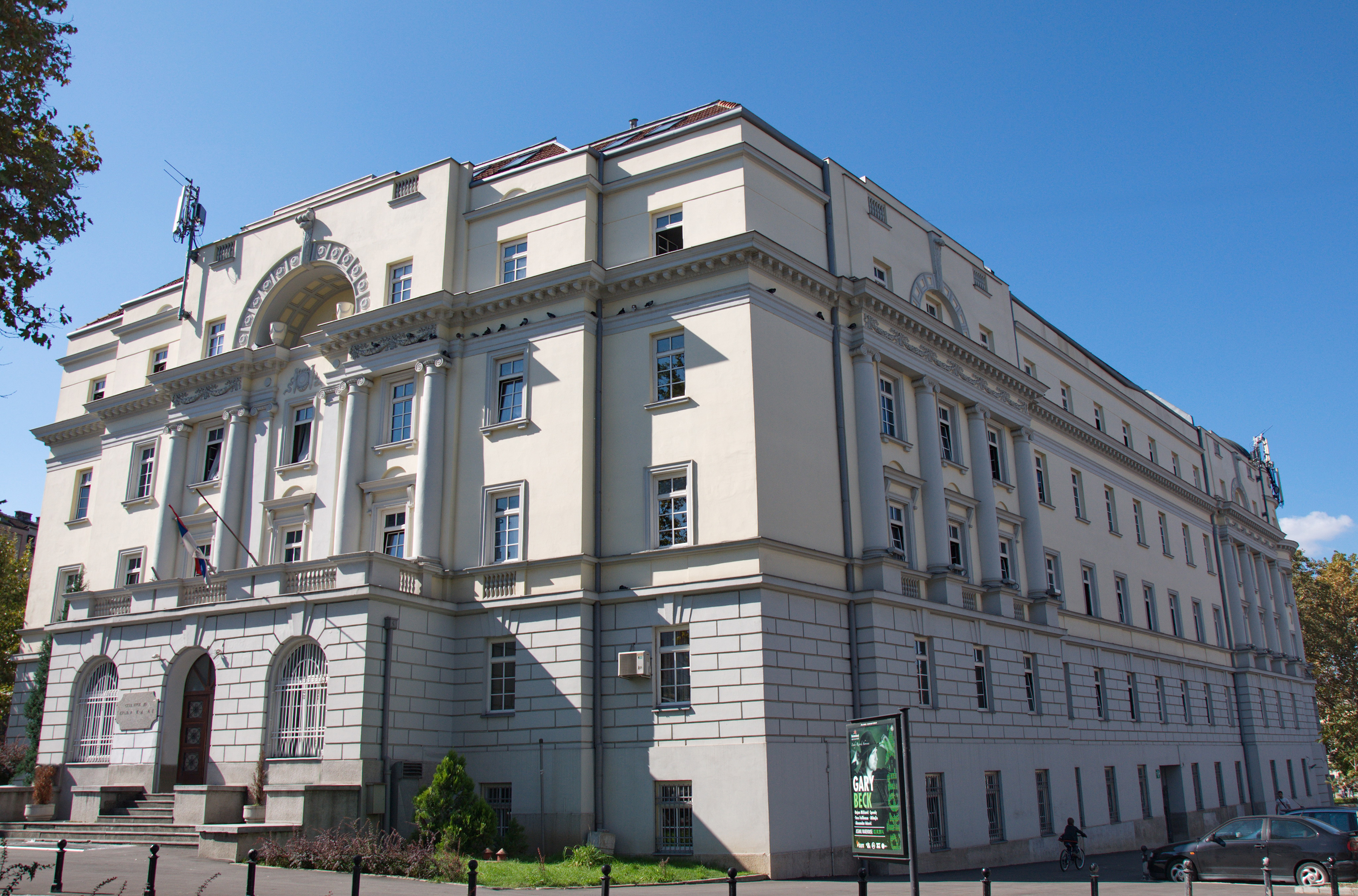
King Alexandar I Dormitory, established in 1927

=== Residential life ===
The University of Belgrade offers housing options within 11 student dormitories and it has the largest student housing system in Serbia, accommodating up to 10,154 students at various locations throughout the city.

==== Dormitories ====
- ''Studentski grad'' (4,406)
- ''Karaburma'' (1,170)
- ''Patris Lumumba'' (1,021)
- ''4. April'' (863)
- ''Slobodan Penezić'' (756)
- ''Kralj Aleksandar I'' (525)
- ''Košutnjak'' (413)
- ''Rifat Burdžević'' (367)
- ''Vera Blagojević I'' and ''Vera Blagojević II'' (313)
- ''Žarko Marinović'' (188)
- ''Mika Mitrović'' (162)

The university's "Studentski grad" in New Belgrade is a dormitory complex organized into 4 blocks. It has a theater building, movie theater, facilities for athletics, two libraries, reading rooms and open stage for summer concerts.

The other dormitories are smaller by capacity and scattered throughout the city's urban neighbourhoods. ''Kralj Aleksandar I'' Dormitory (also known as "Lola") at the King Alexandar Boulevard campus is the oldest dormitory in the Balkans, founded in 1927 by King Alexander I of Yugoslavia. It has 190 rooms and provides accommodation for the university's successful students, based on their grade point average. Some of the dormitories got their names after political leaders. As an example, the Patrice Lumumba Hall of Residence at Belgrade University built in 1961 today continues to carry the name of Lumumba, the first legally elected Prime Minister of the Republic of the Congo after he helped win its independence from Belgium.

== Notable professors ==
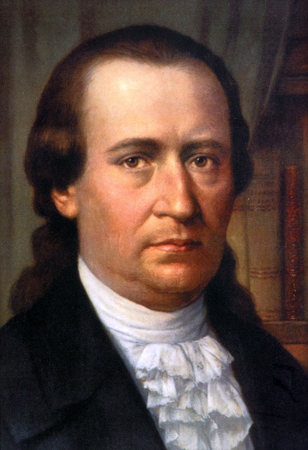
Dositej Obradović

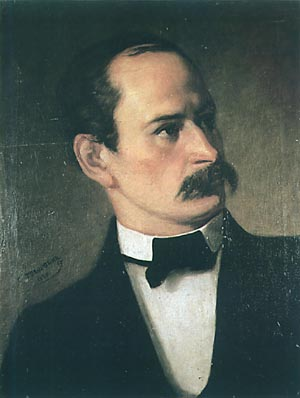
Đuro Daničić

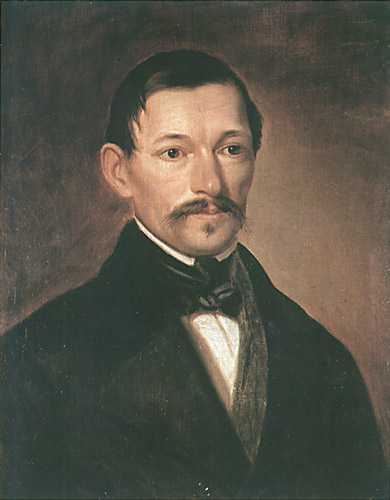
Jovan Sterija Popović

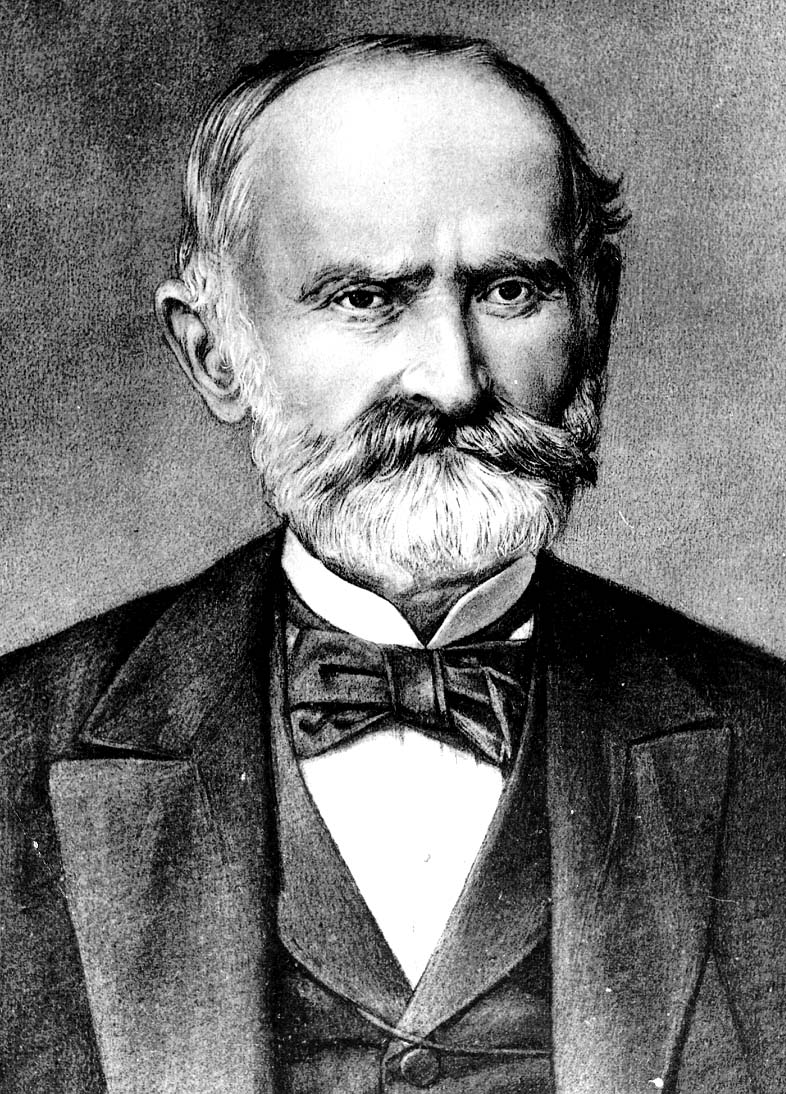
Josif Pančić

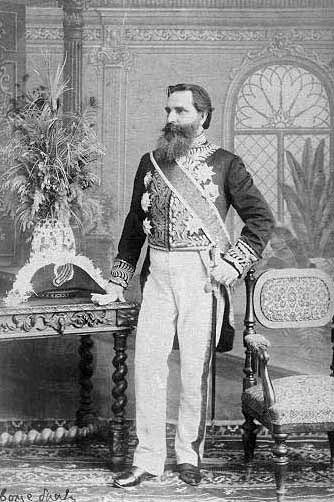
Čedomilj Mijatović

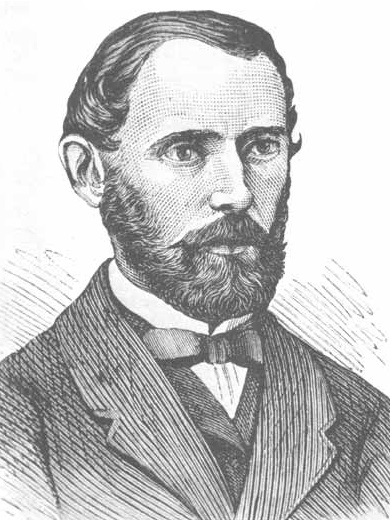
Vladimir Jovanović

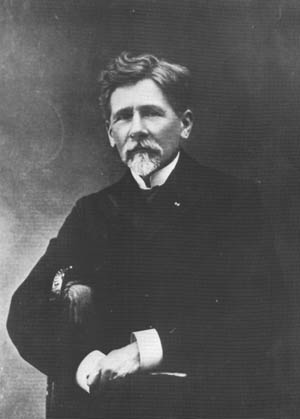
Sima Lozanić

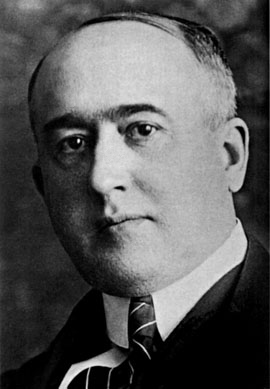
Milutin Milanković

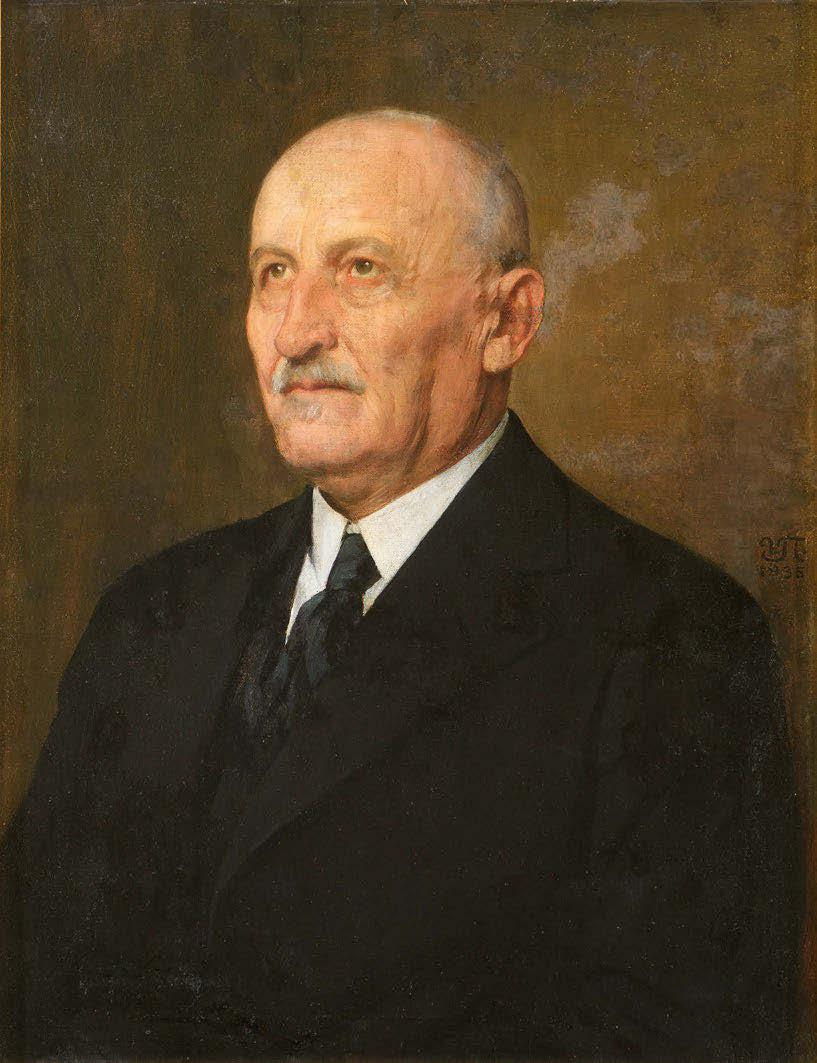
Bogdan Gavrilović

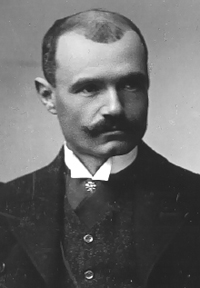
Mihailo Petrović Alas

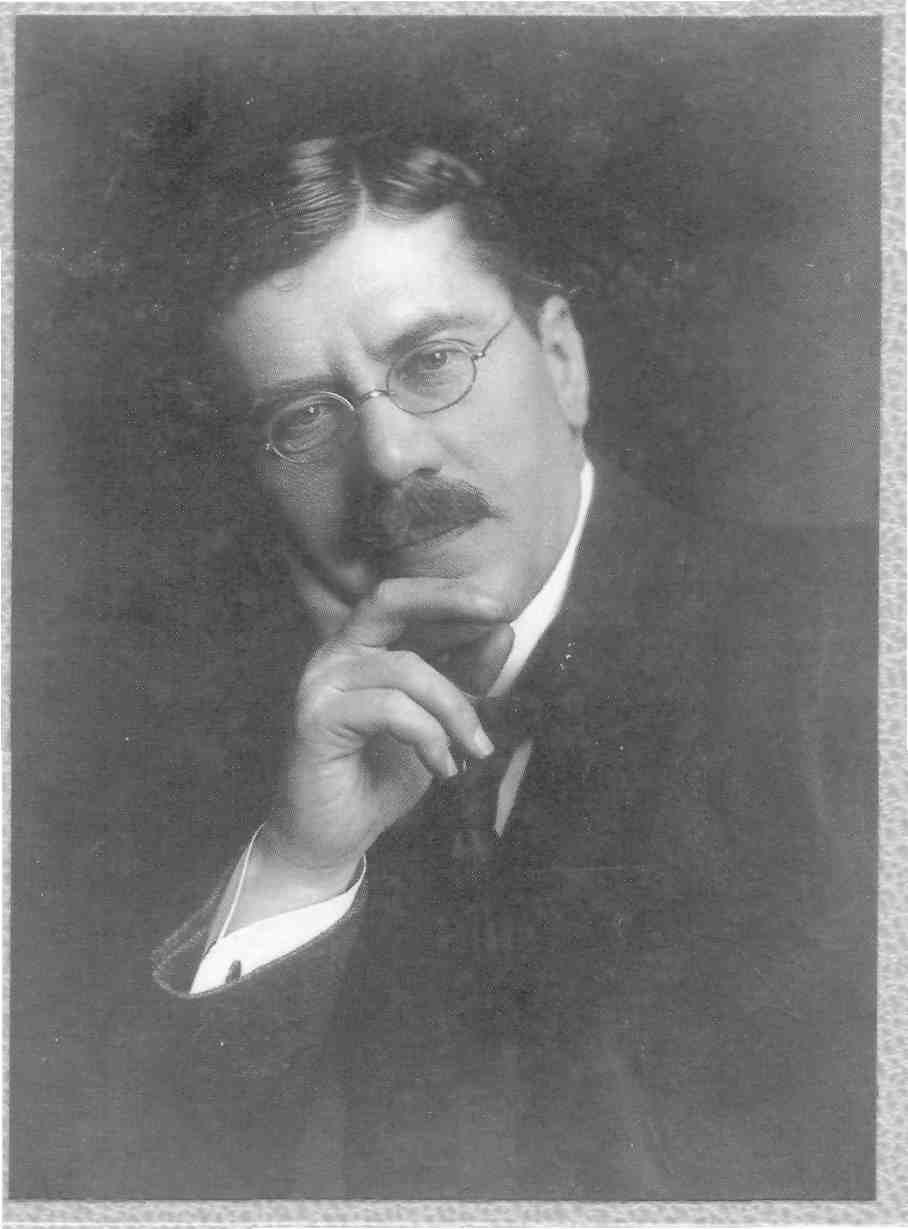
Pavle Popović

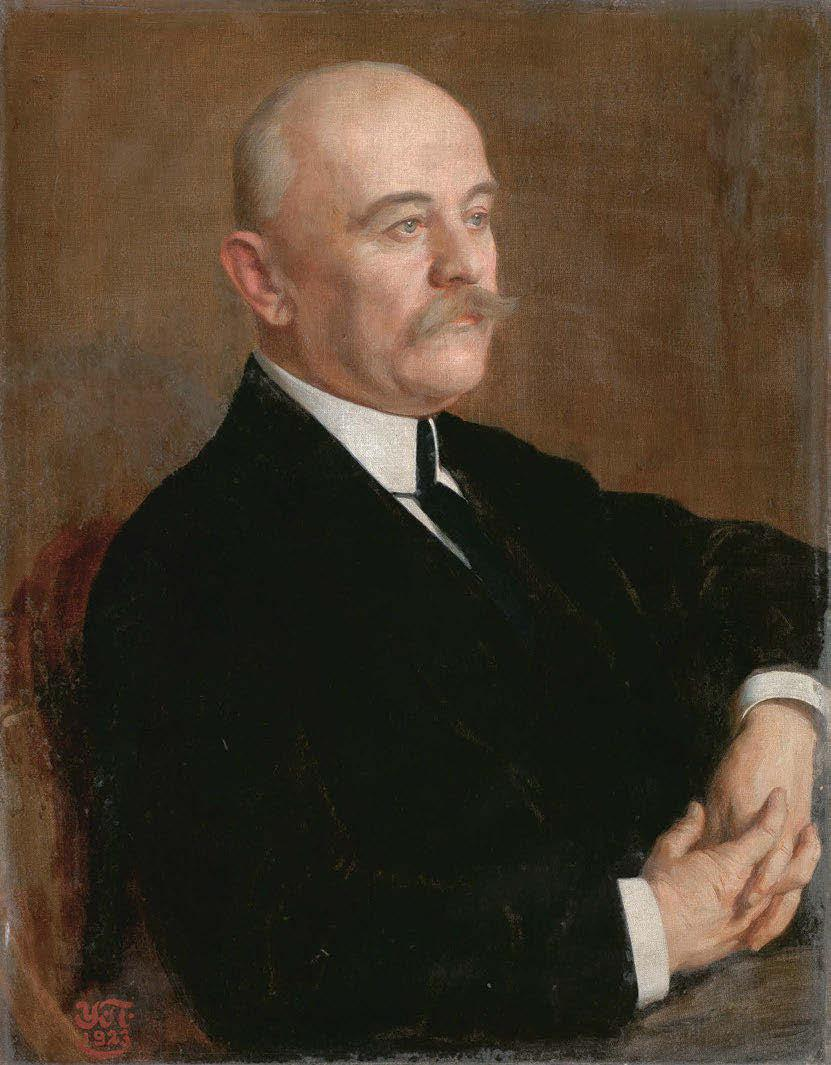
Jovan Cvijić

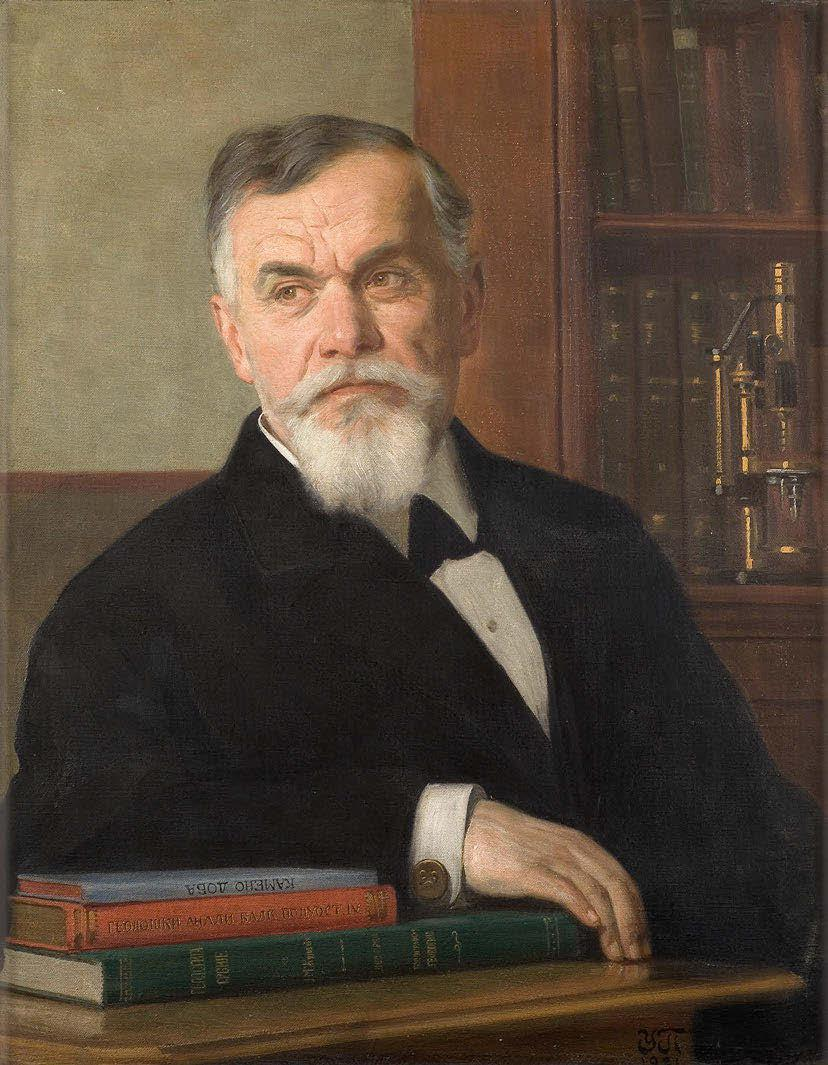
Jovan Žujović

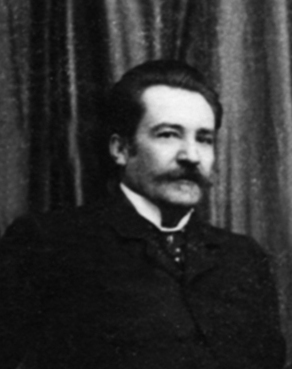
Andra Stevanović

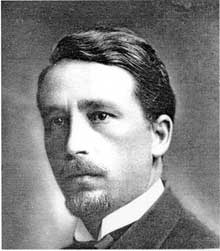
Ivan Đaja

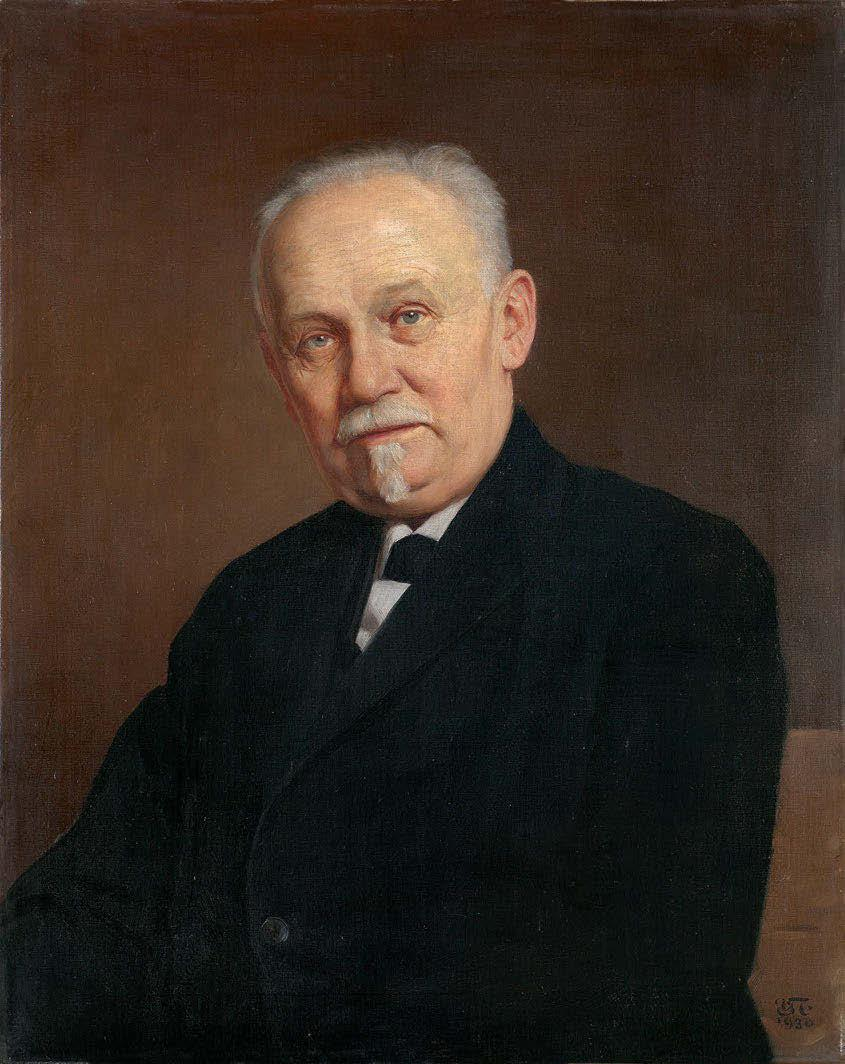
Slobodan Jovanović

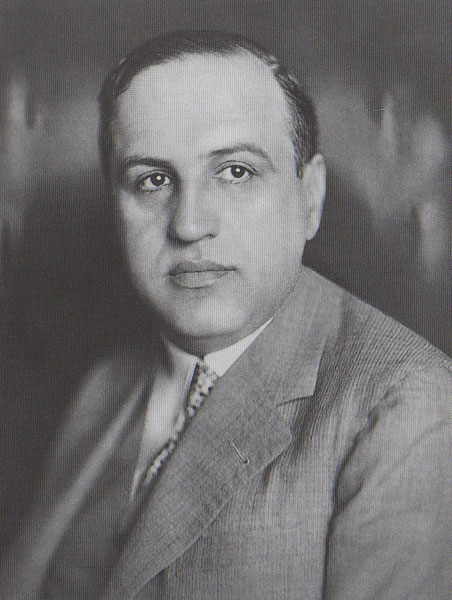
Vladimir Ćorović

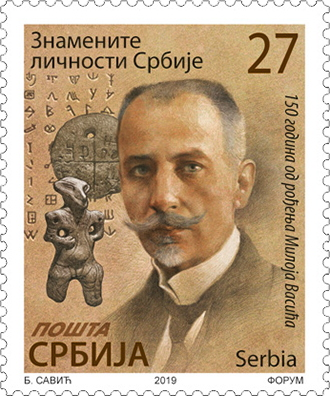
Miloje Vasić

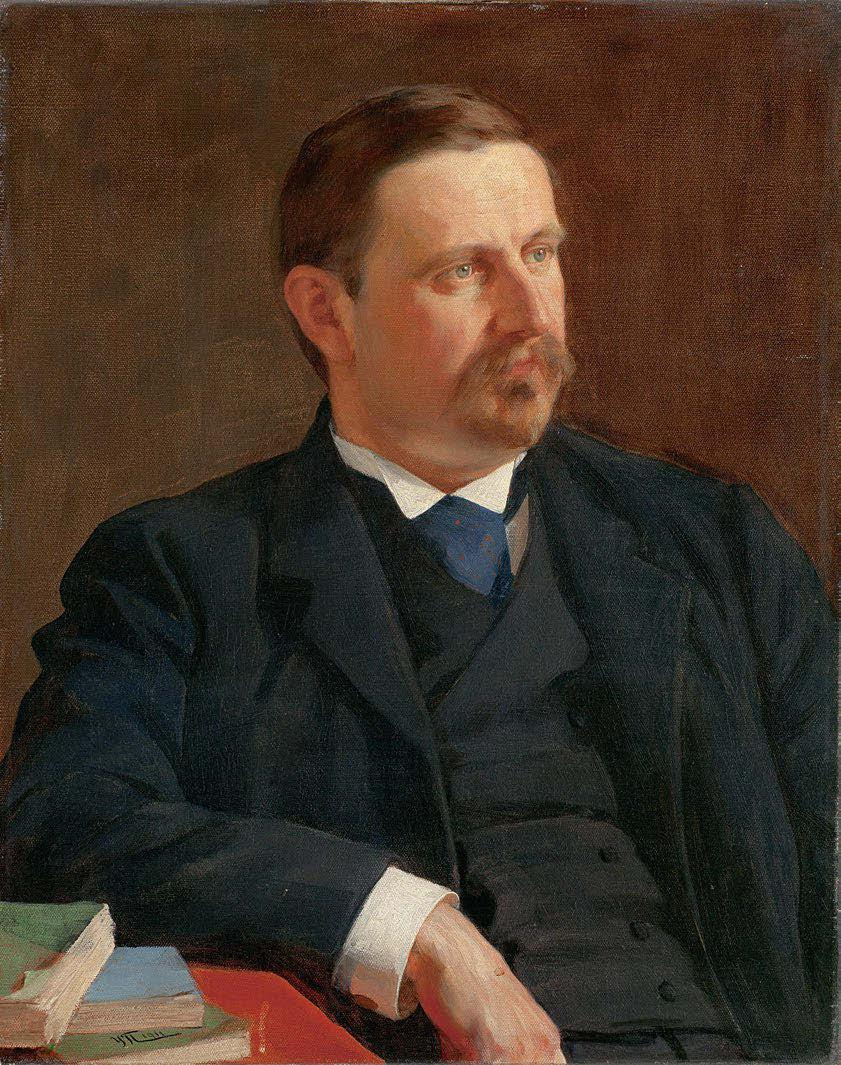
Branislav Petronijević

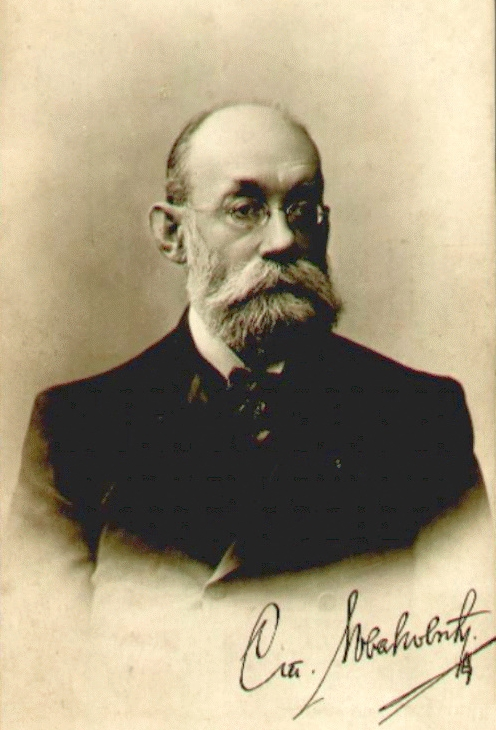
Stojan Novaković

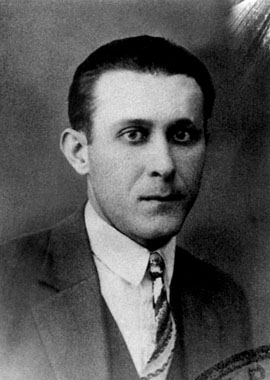
Jovan Karamata

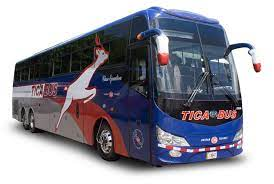
Tihomir Novakov

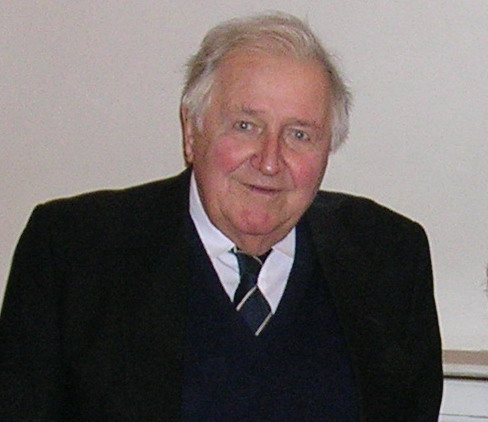
Dejan Medaković

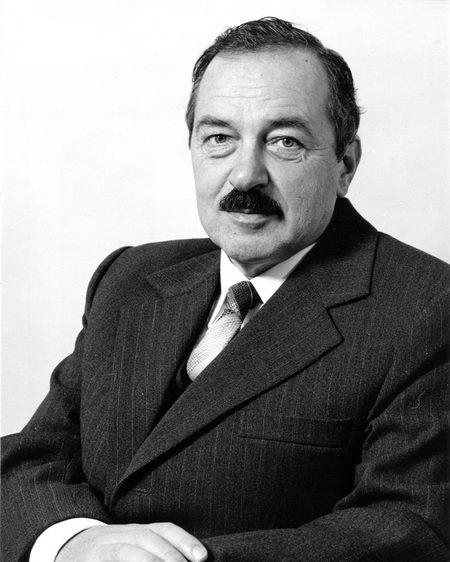
Pavle Ivić

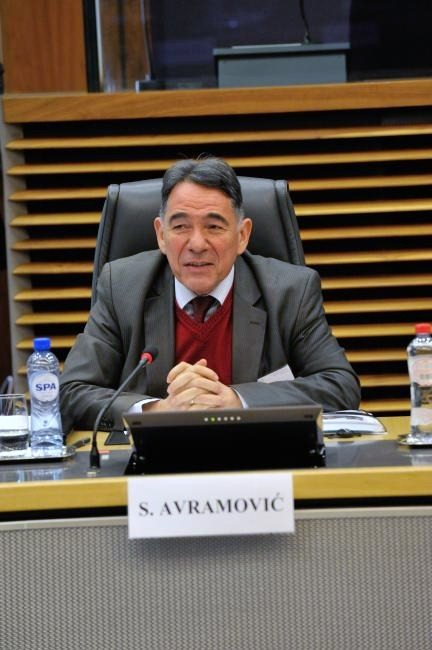
Sima Avramović

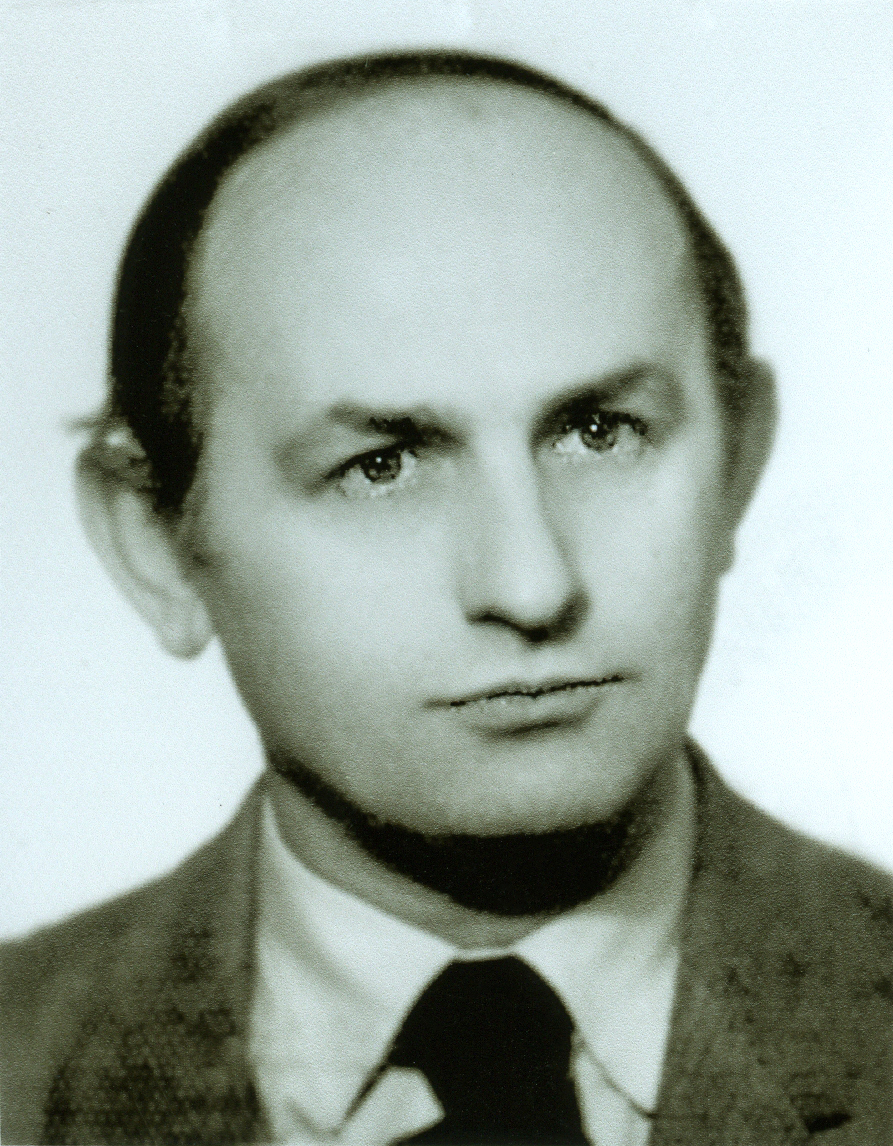
Radomir Đorđević

== Notable alumni ==
- David Albahari
- Lidiia Alekseeva
- Athanasios Angelopoulos
- Branka Arsić
- Staša Babić
- Mina Bizic
- Larisa Blazic
- Danijela Cabric
- Martin Camaj
- Branko Ćopić
- Araldo Cossutta
- Miloš Crnjanski
- Mirko Cvetković
- Jovan Cvijić
- Zoran Đinđić
- Milorad Dodik
- Biljana Dojčinović
- Vuk Drašković
- Mitja Gaspari
- Kiro Gligorov
- Ilijas Farah
- Aleksandra Faust
- Mileva Filipović
- Serbian Patriarch Irinej
- John of Shanghai and San Francisco
- Srgjan Kerim
- Danilo Kiš
- Vojislav Koštunica
- Vuk Kulenovic
- Milan Kurepa
- Ivan Laluha
- Paulina Lebl-Albala
- Sima Lozanić
- Bogdan Maglich
- Sehadete Mekuli
- Desanka Maksimović
- Branko Milanović
- Miroslav Marcovich
- Radenka Maric
- Mihailo Marković
- Vladimir Markovic
- Miloš Milojević
- Miloš N. Đurić
- Nikola Milošević
- Jelena Mišić
- Dragoslav Mitrinović
- Lazar Mojsov
- Abdul Rahman Munif
- Branislav Nušić
- Okwesilieze Nwodo
- Vojin Oklobdzija
- Žarana Papić
- Dușan Pârvulovici
- Fredy Perlman
- Mihailo Petrović
- Zoran Pjanić
- Vaso Radić
- Jasna Rakonjac
- Tamara Rastovac
- Branka Raunig
- Verica Rupar
- Dania Ben Sassi
- Pavle Savić
- Meša Selimović
- Alex Stajkovic
- Ivan Stambolić
- Limon Staneci
- Vojislav Stanimirović
- Borisav Stanković
- Boris Tadić
- Ljubomir Tadić
- Stevo Todorčević
- Zaim Topčić
- Dimitrije Tucović
- Danilo Türk
- Aleksandar Vučić
- Filip Vujanović
- Mirjana Vukićević-Karabin
- Svetozar Vukmanović-Tempo
- Miomir Vukobratović
- Ashagre Yigletu
- Philip Zepter

== See also ==
- Education in Serbia
- List of universities in Serbia
- List of modern universities in Europe (1801–1945)
