= Vojin G. Oklobdzija =

- Војин Г. Оклобџија
- Pronunciation: Vo-in Oklob-j-ia
- Occupations: Computer and electronics engineer, scientist, author and academic

Academic background
- Education: B.S.E.E. electronics and telecommunications graduate studies in physics M.S.E.E. electronics and telecommunications MSc computer science PhD computer science
- Alma mater: University of Belgrade, Yugoslavia; University of California, Los Angeles

Academic work
- Institutions: IBM T.J. Watson Research Center, New York City; Xerox Corporation, Connecticut; University of California, Berkeley; University of California, Davis; University of Sydney, Australia; École Polytechnique Fédérale de Lausanne, Switzerland

Vojin G. Oklobdzija (Cyrillic: Војин Г. Оклобџија) is a computer and electronics engineer, scientist, author, and academic. He is professor emeritus of the University of California, Life Fellow of IEEE and past President of the IEEE Circuits and Systems Society.

== Education ==
Oklobdzija obtained his Dipl. Ing. in electronics and telecommunications from the University of Belgrade, Yugoslavia in 1971, and subsequently worked as a research physicist in plasma physics pursuing his graduate degree. He became a Faculty Member in the Electrical Engineering Department there in 1974 serving until 1976. Later, he earned his MSc in 1978 and PhD in Computer Science in 1982 from the University of California Los Angeles. While pursuing his doctorate, he worked at the Microelectronics Division of Xerox Corporation until 1982, where he was involved in chip development for the early Alto workstation. He holds the highest USA Ham-Radio category, Extra, and call sign WF1A.

== Career ==
From 1982 to 1991 Oklobdzija was a research staff member at the IBM Thomas J. Watson Research Center, where he contributed to the development of RISC processors, super-scalar, and supercomputer designs. He obtained several patents on early RISC machine organization, including one on register-renaming, which he co-holds with John Cocke and Greg Grohoski. This patent described a key feature of the IBM RS/6000.

In 1988 Oklobdzija started his academic career as a Visiting Faculty Member at the University of California, Berkeley, transitioning from his role at IBM. He later served as a Chair Professor in Electrical and Computer Engineering at Sydney University in Australia. Receiving Fulbright Professorships twice, in Peru in 1990 and Argentina in 2012, he helped establish internet connectivity in Peru in 1991 and developed academic courses in Computer Engineering. He has provided expert witness services, testifying at the International Trade Commission Court and in civil court.

At Siemens, which later became Infineon, he served as a Principal Architect and patent holder for the Infineon TriCore processor, an automotive control processor used in vehicles. He also contributed to the original conceptual development of the PlayStation at Sony.

== Research ==
Oklobdzija's work focuses on VLSI chip engineering: low-power digital circuits optimizing the energy-speed relationship, machine learning, computer arithmetic, media signal processing, and system architecture; he has obtained 25 U.S. patents throughout his career.

== Personal life ==
His son is social scientist Stan N. Oklobdzija.

== Awards and honors ==
- 1971–1973 – National Science Fellowship on Plasma Physics, National Science Foundation
- 1976 – Fulbright Scholarship to USA, Fulbright Program
- 1985 – Patent Award, IBM
- 1985 – Invention Plateau Award, IBM
- 1991 – Fulbright Professorship to Peru, Fulbright Program
- 1995 – Fellow, Institute of Electrical and Electronics Engineers
- 2000–2003 – Distinguished Lecturer, IEEE Circuits and Systems Society
- 2000–2007 – Distinguished Lecturer, IEEE Solid-State Circuits Society
- 2002 – Outstanding Academic Title for The Computer Engineering Handbook, Choice Magazine
- 2012 – Fulbright Professorship to Argentina, Fulbright Program
- 2014 – Life Fellow, Institute of Electrical and Electronics Engineers

== Bibliography ==
=== Selected books ===
- Computer Engineering: Digital Systems and Applications 1st Edition (1997) ISBN 978-0849386190
- Computer Engineering: Digital Design and Fabrication 1st Edition (1997) ISBN 978-0849386022
- High-Performance System Design: Circuits and Logic 1st Edition (1999) ISBN 978-0780347168
- The Computer Engineering Handbook 1st Edition (2001) ISBN 978-0849308857
- Digital System Clocking: High-Performance and Low-Power Aspects 1st Edition (2003) ISBN 978-0471274476
- High-Performance Energy-Efficient Microprocessor Design 1st Edition (2006) ISBN 978-3540679097
- The Computer Engineering Handbook 2nd Edition (2008) ISBN 978-0849386008

=== Selected articles ===
- Oklobdzija, V. G. (1994). An algorithmic and novel design of a leading zero detector circuit: Comparison with logic synthesis. IEEE Transactions on Very Large Scale Integration (VLSI) Systems, 2(1), 124–128.
- Oklobdzija, V. G., Maksimovic, D., & Lin, F. (1997). Pass-transistor adiabatic logic using single power-clock supply. IEEE Transactions on Circuits and Systems II: Analog and Digital Signal Processing, 44(10), 842–846.
- Oklobdzija, V. G., Villeger, D., & Liu, S. S. (1996). A method for speed optimized partial product reduction and generation of fast parallel multipliers using an algorithmic approach. IEEE Transactions on computers, 45(3), 294–306.
- Stojanovic, V., & Oklobdzija, V. G. (1999). Comparative analysis of master-slave latches and flip-flops for high-performance and low-power systems. IEEE Journal of solid-state circuits, 34(4), 536–548.
- Nikolic, B., Oklobdzija, V. G., Stojanovic, V., Jia, W., Chiu, J. K. S., & Leung, M. M. T. (2000). Improved sense-amplifier-based flip-flop: Design and measurements. IEEE Journal of Solid-State Circuits, 35(6), 876–884.
