= University of Belgrade Faculty of Security Studies =

University faculty in Belgrade, Serbia

Coordinates: 44.7926°N 20.5034°E

- Факултет безбедности Универзитета у Београду
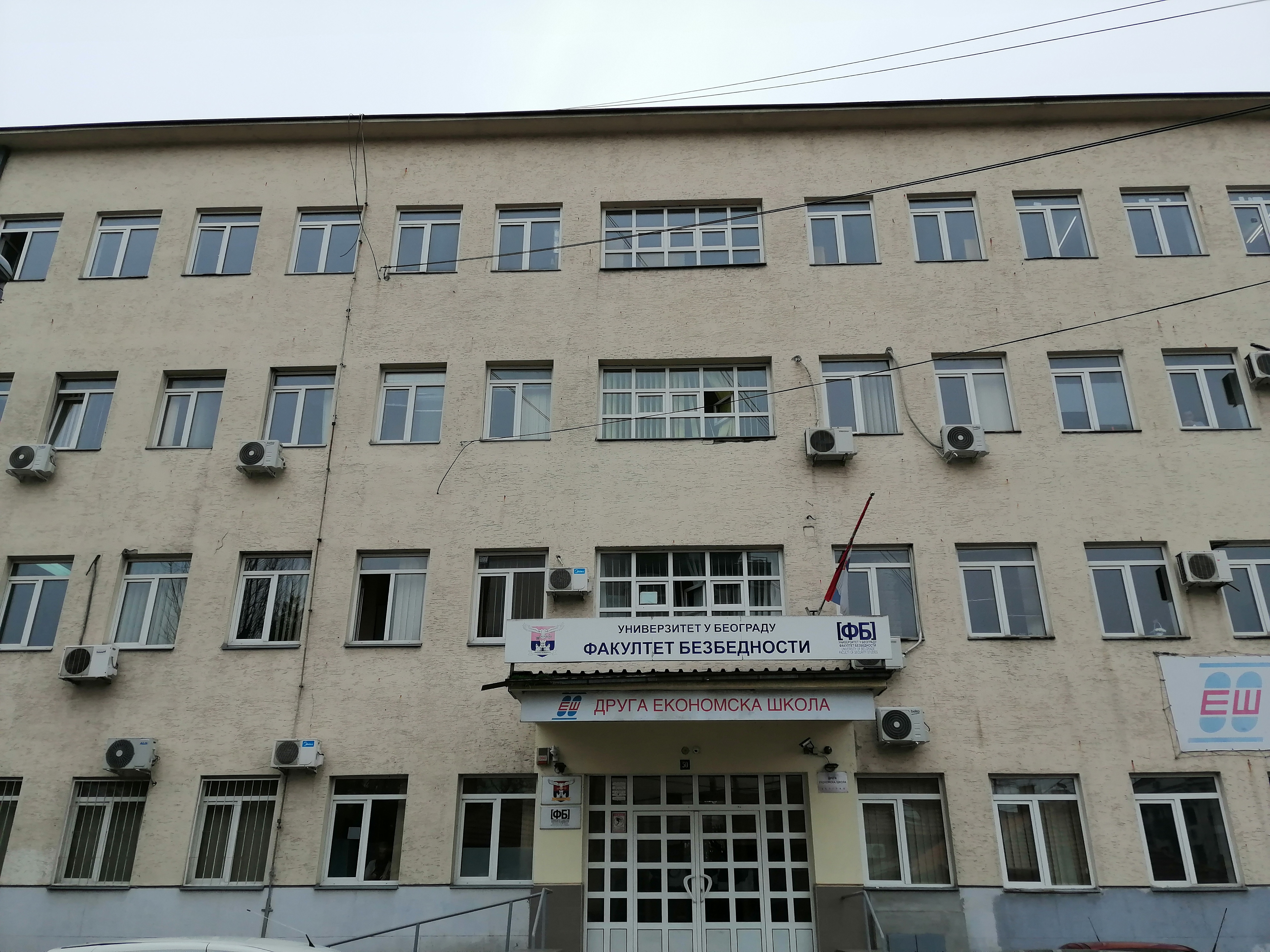
- Motto: Power of knowledge
- Type: Public
- Established: 18 May 1975; 51 years ago
- Affiliations: University of Belgrade
- Dean: Prof. dr Vladimir N. Cvetković
- Faculty: 95 (2018–19)
- Students: 2,535 (2018–19)
- Undergraduates: 2,359 (2018–19)
- Postgraduates: 144 (2018–19)
- Doctoral students: 32 (2018–19)
- Location: Belgrade, Serbia
- Colors: Red and black
- Website: www.fb.bg.ac.rs

The Faculty of Security Studies is an independent faculty of the University of Belgrade. The Faculty’s programs cover philosophical, sociological, political, legal, economic, psychological, ethical, humanitarian, civilian-military, and other aspects of the security studies, human and social resources, defense, civil defense and environment protection.

The Faculty offers academic and undergraduate studies, master's degree studies, doctoral, and specialist undergraduate studies.

== History ==
=== Establishment and development ===
The Socialist Federal Republic of Yugoslavia was founded with the concept of total people's defense (општенародна одбрана) and social self-protection (општенародна самозаштита). From 1945 to 1970, pre-war training was conducted. In 1974, Defense and Protection was introduced into the school curriculum with the aim of educating young people from pre-school to secondary school age. This training was conducted by reserve and active military personnel under the auspices of the Yugoslav Federal Secretariat for National Defense (SSNO). In the 1970s, the SSNO conducted training of personnel for civil defense which proved to be inadequate, and a decision was made to establish a system for training professors of defense and civil defense, and other civil defense experts.

In 1975, five of the six capital cities of the Socialist Republics introduced public defense studies. On 18 May 1975, a National Defense Institute was established, which quickly gained the status of the Department of Social Sciences and National Defense of the University of Belgrade Faculty of Mathematics. That date was later considered as the foundation day for the Faculty of Security Studies. Milan Vučinić was elected as the first dean.

During its first years, the working conditions of the Department at the Faculty of Mathematics were difficult. The faculty only provided the use of its amphitheater, and most teaching was performed in cinemas, cultural centers or when other classrooms were free. This caused lectures to be broken into morning and evening sessions, and the department lacked adequate theoretical and professional literature and teaching staff. Furthermore, all natural and mathematical subjects that the students were obliged to study were not harmonized with the rest of the department's curriculum.

During this period, the Department's students had to undergo adequate military training, in accordance with the concept of total people's defense and social self-protection. Students had military-technical education for the first three years of studies, including basic infantry training at the Military Academy in Belgrade. For the fourth year of the program, students had compulsory internship in units of the Yugoslav People's Army.

In 1977, the Department was given the use of the premises of the elementary school Đuro Đaković in Belgrade. As early as the 1977–78 academic year, due to high popularity, the Department began teaching women. In February 1978, the Department received the first three floors of the Second Economic School in Belgrade where it remains today. Thus separated from the Faculty of Mathematics, it was constituted as a special faculty: the Faculty of People's Defense of the University of Belgrade. There was great interest in this faculty, as graduates were guaranteed jobs as professors in secondary schools in Yugoslavia, with prospects of employment in other institutions which sought preparation for civil defense and wartime conditions.

The Faculty of People's Defense changed its name in 1987 to the Faculty of Total People's Defense and Social Self-Protection. In 1990, it was renamed the Faculty of Defense and Protection.

=== Post-dissolution ===
Following the Breakup of Yugoslavia in 1991, the Law on People's Defense and the Law on the System of Social Self-Protection were repealed. In the absence of this legal basis, grade school defense and protection studies were abolished during the 1993–94 academic year. This decision strongly affected the Faculty of Defense and Protection. The new civil defense system was divided between the military and the police. In April 1993, the Government of the Republic of Serbia prohibited the enrolment of the 18th generation of undergraduate students in the Faculty.

Following these events, the Faculty had only part-time students – primarily graduates from the School of Internal Affairs and the Faculty of Security in Skopje – and the institution was on the brink of closure. In June 1998, a new board of directors was created and reinstated Radovan Jović as dean of the Faculty. Jović and Vučinić started lobbying to preserve the Faculty.

On the basis of Article 17 of the Law on University, the Government of the Republic of Serbia passed the Decision on 16 March 2000 to change the name of the Faculty to the Faculty of Civil Defense at the University of Belgrade. The Faculty was allowed to enrol a new generation of undergraduate students.

The basic problem faced by the Faculty at that time was that there was no longer a title of professor of defense. Therefore, in 2003–04, a new curriculum was planned for the education of security managers. The new program introduced four modules: security, defense, civil protection and environmental protection. In 2006, the Faculty of Civil Defense changed its name to the Faculty of Security Studies to reflect this change in curriculum.

== Administration ==
The Faculty is administered by a council composed of founders, professors, associate professors, three non-faculty employees and four students. The Faculty is managed by its dean and four vice deans, three of whom are professors with the fourth being a student. The expert bodies of the Faculty are its Academic Council and Electoral Council. Faculty activities take place within organizational units.

Academic organizational units or departments:

- Security Studies
- Defense Studies
- Civil Protection and Environment Protection Studies
- Human and Social Resources Management Studies
- Humanities Studies

Research organizational units:

- Security Studies Institute
- Human Security Research Centre
- Peace Studies Centre
- Conflict Research Centre
- Security Management Centre
- Innovations Centre

Organizational units of the administrative, technical, and professional services:

- General Operations
- Student Services
- Accounting
- Student Consulting Centre
- Library

== Student organizations ==
The Faculty of Security Studies has three recognized student organizations:

- Student Club of the Faculty of Security Studies (Клуб студената Факултета безбедности), established on 16 December 2005, is the oldest active student organization.
- Student Parliament (Студентски парламент), established in 2006 by official student representatives of the Faculty.
- Student Association Club of the Faculty of Security Studies (Асоцијација студената Факултета безбедности), established on 24 November 2014.

== Deans ==
The deans of the Faculty since its foundation are:

- Prof. Dr. Milan Vučinić (1975–1981)
- Prof. Dr. Žarko Krupež (1981–1986)
- Prof. Dr. Nikola Ivančević (1986–1990)
- Prof. Dr. Radovan C. Jović (1990–1994)
- Prof. Dr. Dragoslav Vojčić (1994–1998)
- Prof. Dr. Radovan C. Jović (1998–2001)
- Prof. Dr. Dragana Dulić (2001–2004)
- Prof. Dr. Vladimir N. Cvetković (2004–2008)
- Prof. Dr. Vladimir N. Cvetković (2008–2012)
- Prof. Dr. Radomir Milašinović (2012–2016)
- Prof. Dr. Ivica Radović (2016–2018)
- Prof. Dr. Vladimir N. Cvetković (2018–present)

== Bibliography ==
- Dimitrijević, Ivan (2014). "Osnivanje i razvoj Fakulteta bezbednosti sa osvrtom na društvene promene i reformu visokog obrazovanja u Republici Srbiji". Faculty of Security Studies Annual (in Serbian). Belgrade: Faculty of Security Studies: 229–240.
- Vučinić, Milan (2005). "Review of the initial period of 30 years of activity of the Faculty of Civil Defense with a view of its function today and the future". University of Belgrade Faculty of Civil Defense: 1975-2005 (in Serbian). Belgrade: Faculty of Civil Defense: 9–17.
