= Alex Stajkovic =

Organizational behavior professor (born 1965)

Alex Stajkovic is an Organizational Behavior (OB) professor who has conducted research on confidence and goal priming. He holds the Dean's Professorship in Business at the Wisconsin School of Business at the University of Wisconsin - Madison. His research bears on self-efficacy, confidence, and primed goals. Stajkovic co-authored papers with Albert Bandura, Edwin Locke, and Fred Luthans. Stajkovic is a contributing editor to the Journal of Applied Psychology, as well as a member of the Midwestern Psychological Association and Society for Science of Motivation.

== Early life ==
Born in 1965 to Yugoslavian parents, Stajkovic grew up in Belgrade. He enrolled in the University of Belgrade in 1985, studying economics. He was president of Association Internationale des Étudiants en Sciences Économiques et Commerciales (AIESEC) for the Economics Faculty in Belgrade in 1987-1988.

== Education ==
Stajkovic graduated with a Ph.D. in organizational behavior from the University of Nebraska–Lincoln in December 1996. Luthans was Stajkovic's dissertation chair. Stajkovic also earned a Master of Arts in Management from the University of Nebraska–Lincoln in 1993. His undergraduate education was completed at the University of Belgrade where he earned a Bachelor of Science in Economics in 1991.

== Academia career ==
After receiving his degree, Stajkovic earned an offer to work in Milan, which he did for a few years. In 1999 Stajkovic became an assistant professor at the Wisconsin School of Business. In 2006 he became an associate professor. In 2007-2008, he was a visiting scholar at Stanford University (psychology). From 2008 - 2013 Stajkovic held the Procter and Gamble Chair in Business, and from 2013 - 2015 he was the M. Keith Weikel Professor in Leadership. He has held the M. Keith Weikel Distinguished Chair in Leadership since 2015.

A study conducted in 2018 placed Stajkovic in the top one percent of most-cited textbook authors in the field of organizational behavior.

== Theories ==
=== Core confidence ===
Stajkovic developed core confidence theory to help better understand employee motivation. The theory holds that ability and motivation to some extent predict performance. Other factors need to be taken into account. Stajkovic (2006) explains:

"What I try to add to the literature is a suggestion that skill and desire need to be joined with confidence, a personal certainty belief that one can handle what one desires to do or needs to be done at work" (p. 1209)

Behavior = Skill x Will x Confidence

Suboptimal = Skill x Will x Doubt

Stajkovic states that confidence resides deep within individuals — at their core — and is not directly observable. Instead, we see it manifest in people through their hope, self-efficacy, optimism, and resilience. He advanced the view that these traits represent one common core, namely confidence, and that core confidence predicts job performance, job satisfaction, and satisfaction with life. Trait core confidence has also been shown to mitigate stress, anxiety, and depression of aspiring entrepreneurs. Along with core confidence, Stajkovic also defines trait core confidence as a "certainty can-do belief that spans across related domains of activity."

To support these claims, Stajkovic conducted a series of studies to analyze whether self-efficacy predicts academic achievement above and beyond personality. They analyzed the Big Five personality traits (conscientiousness, agreeableness, extroversion/introversion, openness to experience, and emotional stability), which are defined as innate dispositions. They examined the predictive power of personality and self-efficacy on students' grades. Their findings ultimately concluded that "self-efficacy was predictive of academic achievement above and beyond personality in all of the analyses." In terms of practical implications, this research reaffirmed that students can develop the skills, specifically the confidence, to succeed. Stajkovic has also published articles on self-regulation, which goes hand-in-hand with core confidence and self-efficacy. Self-regulation is connected to processes related to underlying attitudes and behaviors and how they happen. Research on self-regulation has put a focus on how core confidence plays a role in self-regulation of job performance as well as life satisfaction. The role core confidence plays in adaptive self-regulation is that the person already has the skill and motivation but is triggered psychology to enable this potential. Doubt inhibits this potential. Looking at both confidence levels, individuals with low core confidence are less likely to participate in activities if there is doubt. Individuals with high core confidence are able to overcome this doubt. Stajkovic hypothesized that core confidence was positively related to performance, satisfaction with life, and job satisfaction. Tests of these hypothesis found core confidence was in fact a significant predictor of performance, satisfaction with life, and job satisfaction in both the students and employees who were studied but also cautioned that future research should look into when too much core confidence might cause negative consequences due to it becoming arrogance.

A talk by Stajkovic that summarizes his research on confidence and its effect on job performance is available here.

In a 2007 interview with Elle, Stajkovic gave insight into how to increase self-efficacy. In the interview, his advice to people seeking to grow themselves in their work is to study the habits of their peers who have similar or more advanced skills.

=== Interaction of primed subconscious and conscious goals ===
In an experiment published in 2006 Stajkovic and colleagues examined the relationship between primed subconscious goals and conscious goals. Conscious goal setting theory asserts that consciously setting specific, difficult goals explains and predicts work performance. The study of conscious goal setting has been largely confined to the study of organizational behavior. Subconscious goal theory asserts that motivational goals can be activated (primed) through stimulating the subconscious mind. The study of subconscious goal activation has been the work of social psychology researchers. Stajkovic and his collaborators designed the first experiment to attempt to connect these two theories.

The subjects in the experiment set conscious goals in three conditions: easy goals, do your best goals and specific difficult goals. The subjects were then subconsciously primed using achievement related words. Subjects were then given the task of listing possible uses for a coat hanger. The experiment showed that both subconscious priming and conscious goal setting had a significant effect on achievement of the difficult and do your best goals. Neither had a significant effect on attainment of an easy goal. The results also showed a significant two-way interaction between subconscious and conscious goals.

In 2019, Stajkovic, with Kayla Sergent, published Cognitive Automation and Organizational Psychology; Priming Goals as a New Source of Competitive Advantage. As the title suggests, Stajkovic and Sergent posit that cognitive automation, that is, using the subconscious, to prime goals to free up working or active memory in task performance provides an opportunity for competitive advantage. Stajkovic and Sergent argue that the use of the subconscious to prime goals will produce a competitive advantage in business. The authors state the problem that the modern worker is experiencing cognitive overload in the workplace due to the complexities and demands of the same. Upon stating the problem, the authors set about providing empirical data to support their argument to show that the use of subconscious processing can provide a competitive advantage in business.
