= Gary Suiter =

American basketball player

Personal information
- Born: January 18, 1945 Omaha, Nebraska, U.S.
- Died: October 23, 1982 (aged 37) near Rio Rancho, New Mexico, U.S.
- Listed height: 6 ft 9 in (2.06 m)
- Listed weight: 225 lb (102 kg)

Career information
- High school: Sandia (Albuquerque, New Mexico)
- College: Midwestern State (1966–1969)
- NBA draft: 1969: undrafted
- Playing career: 1970–1971
- Position: Center / power forward
- Number: 40

Career history
- 1970: Scranton Miners
- 1970: Binghamton Flyers
- 1970–1971: Cleveland Cavaliers
- 1971: Trenton Pat Pavers
- Stats at NBA.com
- Stats at Basketball Reference

Gary G. Suiter (January 18, 1945 – October 23, 1982) was an American professional basketball player.

Suiter was a 6'9" center from Midwestern State University, and played for the Mustangs from 1966 to 1969. He had previously attended the University of New Mexico in 1962 on a basketball scholarship but transferred after numerous disciplinary reasons.

Suiter played one season (1970–71) in the National Basketball Association (NBA) as a member of the Cleveland Cavaliers and averaged 1.4 points in 30 games. He was the first person from Albuquerque to play in the NBA.

Suiter was known as a gambler, and he was murdered over an alleged money debt in 1982.

== Early life ==
Suiter was born in Omaha, Nebraska, on January 18, 1944. Suiter attended Sandia High School, where he played at the center and power forward positions. Suiter was a unanimous All-State selection his senior season, and was the only New Mexico selection for the high school All-American team. In his senior season, he was recruited by Kentucky, Kansas State, Texas Western (now UTEP), Arizona, Arizona State, Idaho State, Brigham Young University, New Mexico State University, Texas Tech, the University of Washington, Pepperdine, and the University of New Mexico.

== College career ==
Bob King, the University of New Mexico's basketball coach, said Suiter was, “one of the best freshman prospects he had ever seen.”

Suiter accepted the University of New Mexico's offer, however, Suiter did not play past the fall semester. There were multiple reasons for Suiter's dismissal; he was previously asked to move out of the dormitories and was having scholastic difficulties. He was often late for practices and study halls. He had a hoarding issue, and would collect pizza boxes, Beatles vinyl, and MAD Magazines. Bob King was upset to see Suiter leave the program, but would take him back if he, “clears up his many problems.”

Suiter enrolled at Midwestern State University in the fall of 1966. Suiter hitchhiked from New Mexico to Wichita Falls and called Midwestern State's coach Dennis Vinzant asking for a tryout. After sitting out a year due to transfer rules, he played a total of 2 years for the Mustangs. In his junior year Suiter played in 11 games, averaging a double-double, with 14.8 points per a game and 10 rebounds per a game on average. Suiter's senior year saw more productivity; he started all 28 games and again averaged a double-double. Suiter averaged 22.1 points per a game, and pulled in 15.4 rebounds per a game. He was not selected in the 1969 NBA draft.

== Professional career ==
In September 1969, Suiter attended rookie camp with the Los Angeles Stars of the American Basketball Association (ABA). He toured France with other former college basketball players.

In January 1970, Suiter joined the Scranton Miners of the Eastern Professional Basketball League (EPBL). On January 10, he scored four points in his debut during a win over the Hamden Bics. On January 31, Suiter's player rights were traded to the Binghamton Flyers. On February 1, he scored a team-high 29 points in his Flyers debut in a loss to the Sunbury Mercuries.

Suiter tried out for the Cleveland Cavaliers in 1970. He, "appeared one day with a armload of films, and made the team by blocking two shots of a disinterested Connie Hawkins at an exhibition game." He played in 30 games and averaged 1.4 points. He played 140 minutes in 30 games (4.7 mpg) that season, and was nearly cut at halftime of the first game. Suiter was cut midway through the 1970–1971 season, because he "was found in full uniform in the stands munching hot dogs."

On January 23, 1971, Suiter was acquired by the Trenton Pat Pavers of the Eastern Basketball Association (EBA). He made his first appearance with the team that same day and scored 4 points in a loss to the Hamden Bics. On January 30, Suiter was released by the Pavers. In February, he worked out for the Camden Bullets.

Suiter was cut by the 76ers in September, 1973, after making the team a month before.

== Later life ==
Suiter was arrested over a $175 shoplifting accusation. Because of the overcrowding of jails in Albuquerque, Suiter was incarcerated at the Penitentiary of New Mexico. He was incarcerated just 8 days before the New Mexico State penitentiary riots took place in 1980, the most violent prison riot in U.S. history. Suiter was beaten with a metal pipe and other bludgeons by inmates that were intoxicated. Suiter suffered lacerations, contusions, and fractures. He claimed his leg was permanently impaired. Suiter ended up suing the state, and won due to the prisons lack of adequate security. Albert Jerome Romero pleaded guilty for assault against Suiter, and was sentenced to 18 months in prison.

== Gambling issues ==
Suiter was known to be a gambler, and often hustled at pool halls around New Mexico and Texas. He was "a fairly good pool player and you could find him in the pool halls during the day and then on the 3 by 6 bar tables at night." Suiter began his gambling issue inside the University of New Mexico's Student Union Building. The breaking point of Suiter being kicked out of UNM was because he was caught playing pool wearing the football coaches' letterman jacket that he stole.

A year before his murder, Suiter was robbed of $2,500 and a diamond ring by a business owner. The business owner and Suiter had been playing Craps, and after Suiter had won $2,500, the business owner brandished a pistol and shot at Suiter.

== Death ==
On October 23, 1982, Suiter was murdered near Rio Rancho, New Mexico, as he allegedly owed money. He had been lured by Gary Randall Hoxsie and John Waters to the banks of the Rio Grande under the pretence of a dice game. After a heated argument, Hoxsie shot Suiter in the hand, chest, and head at close range with a .375 Magnum. Suiter's body was found the next morning by two duck hunters. Hoxsie was arrested at an Albuquerque pawn shop when he tried to sell Suiter's jewelry. In 1983, Hoxsie was sentenced to life in prison for killing Suiter. Waters testified against Hoxsie and received probation after pleading guilty to tampering with evidence.

== Legacy ==
Suiter was ranked the second "Most Colorful Cavalier Player" by the Plain Dealer.

== Career statistics ==
Legend
GP	Games played	GS	Games started	MPG	Minutes per game
FG%	Field goal percentage	3P%	3-point field goal percentage	FT%	Free throw percentage
RPG	Rebounds per game	APG	Assists per game	SPG	Steals per game
BPG	Blocks per game	PPG	Points per game	**Bold**	Career high

=== NBA ===
==== Regular season ====
Year	Team	GP	MPG	FG%	FT%	RPG	APG	PPG
1970–71	Cleveland	30	4.7	.352	.444	1.4	.1	1.4
