= Sandia High School =

High School in Albuquerque, New Mexico

Coordinates: 35.117°N 106.559°W

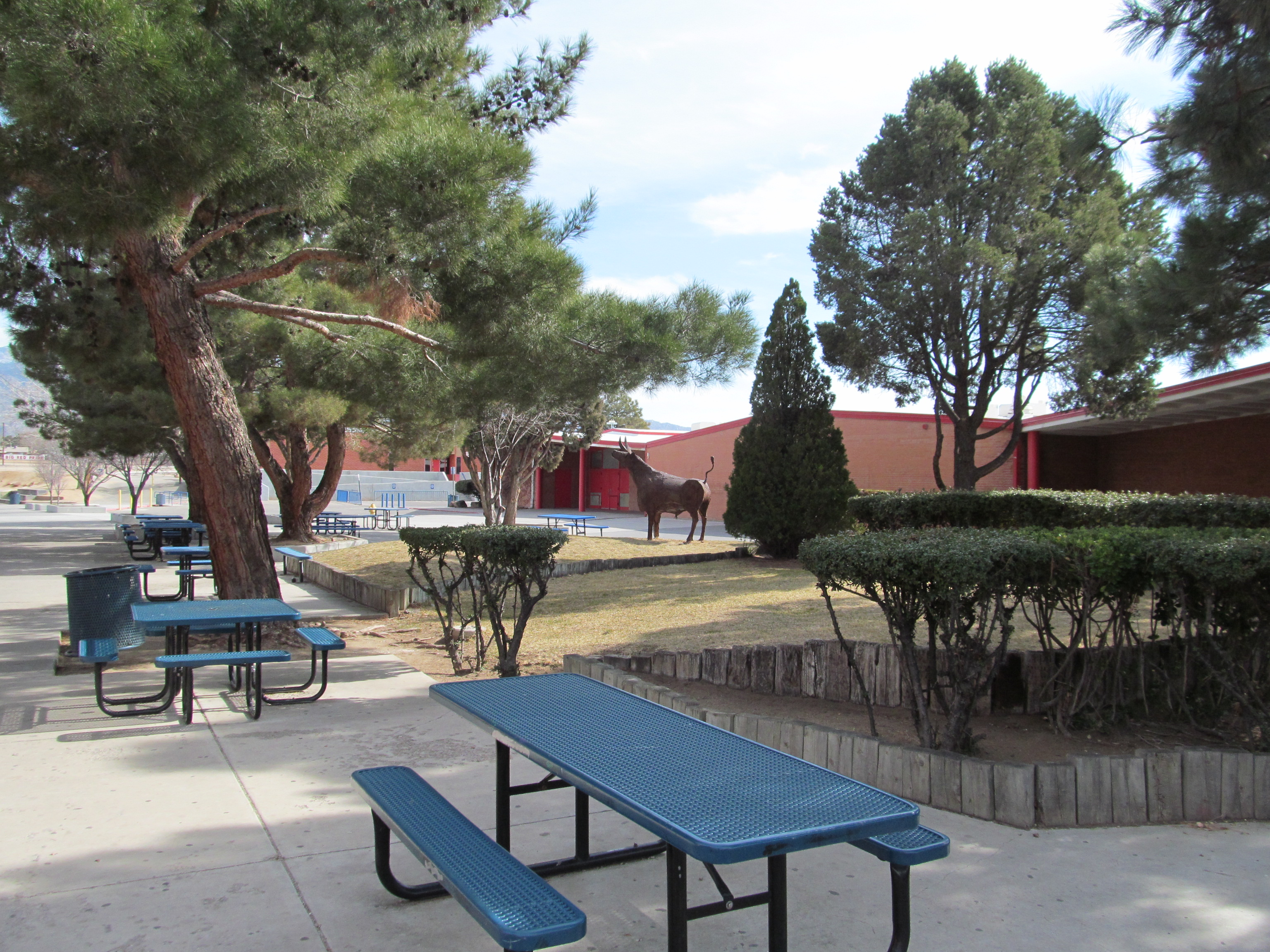

Location
- 7801 Candelaria Road Northeast; Albuquerque, New Mexico 87100; United States

Information
- Type: Public high school
- Motto: Scholarship, Honor, Service
- Established: 1958
- Principal: Camille Gonzales
- Staff: 103.75 (FTE)
- Enrollment: 1,672 (2023-2024)
- Student to teacher ratio: 16.12
- Color
- Athletics conference: NMAA, 6A Dist. 2
- Mascot: Matador
- Website: sandia.aps.edu

Sandia High School (SHS) is a public high school located in the northeast heights of Albuquerque, New Mexico. It is a member of the Albuquerque Public Schools district. The current enrollment is 1,776.

== History ==
The school opened in 1958 and was originally constructed to hold between 1,800 and 2,000 students at a cost of $1.3 million. The smaller Yucca school, located east of the main building, was completed in 1959 to house elementary students. The Yucca school was phased out as an elementary school in 1974 due to low enrollment, and was used as an annex to Sandia.

The originally proposed mascot name was the Sandia Satans, which prompted negative reactions from the community. Thereafter, the mascot name was changed to "Matadors," after a vote that included the alternative proposed mascot names "Thunderbirds" and "Road Runners." A Matador sculpture was placed in the student commons area in 1979.

In the late 1970s, the school reached a record student population for the state of New Mexico. This led to the approval and construction of a newer facility, La Cueva High School, in the early 1980s.

In 2012 Albuquerque Public Schools initiated a significant rebuilding project at Sandia High School. New construction included a new mathematics and science classroom building, a new library, and rebuilt athletic fields.

As of 2013, Sandia High School is home to the International Baccalaureate program.

As of September 2021, Sandia High School's principal is Camille Gonzales.

== Demographics ==
During the 2023-2024 academic year more than half of the students at Sandia High School were Hispanic. About a quarter of the students were white.

== Athletics ==
The first athletic win in school history was a 26-0 football victory over Española Valley High School on September 20, 1958. At this time, Sandia still had the Satan as the mascot. It was a week later that Sandia officially changed the mascot to the Matador.

Sandia High School competes in the New Mexico Activities Association (NMAA). For 2022/2023-2023/2024, the NMAA realigned the state's districts and classifications. Sandia competes in 5A in every sport except football. Football is still a 6A classification.

=== State titles ===
Boys

- Baseball: 1968, 1974, 1979, 1980, 2025
- Basketball: 1962, 1967, 1985
- Football: 1976
- Soccer: 1982, 1992
- Golf: 1966, 1968, 1975, 1977, 2009
- Hockey: (Non NMAA) 2001
- Tennis: 2013
- Track and Field: 1976, 1977
- Volleyball: (Non NMAA) 2022
- Wrestling: 1960, 1972, 1973, 1979, 1980, 1981
- Cross Country: 2000

Girls

- Volleyball: 1973, 2013, 2017
- Soccer: 1985 (co-champions), 1996, 2000, 2008, 2018
- Basketball: 1996, 2001, 2010, 2017
- Golf: 2004, 2006, 2008, 2009, 2010, 2012
- Softball: 1978
- Tennis: 2002, 2003, 2004, 2005, 2019
- Cheerleading: 2008
- Gymnastics: 1986, 1987, 1988, 1989, 1990
- Dance/Drill: 1971, 1973, 1975, 1976, 1977, 1980, 1987, 1988, 1991, 1992

== Student activities ==
The Sandian, a student newspaper, has been published for many years.

== Alumni ==
- David Addington, former Vice President Dick Cheney's Chief of Staff
- Richard Angulo, coach and former player in NFL
- Brendan Donnelly, former MLB player (Anaheim Angels, Boston Red Sox, Cleveland Indians, Florida Marlins, Pittsburgh Pirates)
- Gary Johnson, former Governor of New Mexico and 2012 presidential candidate
- Eric Kibi, professional basketball player
- DeAndre Lansdowne, professional basketball player
- Robert Mercer, hedge fund CO-CEO of Renaissance Technologies, who played a key role in Brexit and Trump campaigns
- Janet Napolitano, former US Secretary of Homeland Security and Arizona Governor
- Madolyn Smith, movie and television actress
- Gary Suiter, professional basketball player and first person from Albuquerque to play in the NBA
- Heidi Swedberg, movie and television actress
- Lydia Tapia, computer science professor
