= Lawrence Rauchwerger =

American computer scientist

- Born: Romania
- Education: University of Illinois at Urbana-Champaign; Stanford University; Polytechnic Institute of Bucharest
- Known for: Parallel computing Compilers; Computer architecture
- Awards: IEEE Fellow 2012; IBM Faculty Award (2007) (2008); Intel Faculty Award (2005); NSF Faculty Early Career Development (CAREER) Award (1998–2002)
- Scientific career
- Fields: Computer science
- Workplaces: University of Illinois Urbana-Champaign; Texas A&M University
- Doctoral advisor: David Padua
- Website: cs.illinois.edu/about/people/faculty/rwerger

Lawrence Rauchwerger is an American computer scientist noted for his research in parallel computing, compilers, and computer architecture. He is an ACM Distinguished Member. and the deputy director of the Institute of Applied Mathematics and Computational Sciences at Texas A&M University. He is the co-director of the Parasol Lab and manages the lab's software and systems group.

Rauchwerger co-leads the STAPL project with his wife Dr. Nancy M. Amato, who is also a computer scientist on the faculty at Texas A&M. STAPL is a parallel C++ library.

== Biography ==
Rauchwerger received a bachelor's degree in electronics and telecommunications from the Polytechnic Institute of Bucharest, Romania in 1980. His diploma project was titled Design and Implementation of an Alphanumeric and Graphic Display. He received a M.S. in computer science from Stanford University in 1987, where his research area was manufacturing science and technology for VLSI (equipment modeling). He received a Ph.D in computer science from the University of Illinois at Urbana-Champaign in 1995 where his dissertation title was Run-Time Parallelization: A Framework for Parallel Computation.

He then joined the Center for Supercomputing R&D at the University of Illinois at Urbana-Champaign as a visiting assistant professor in 1995. He joined the Department of Computer Science at Texas A&M University as an assistant professor in 1996. He was promoted to associate professor in 2001 and to professor in 2006.

== Awards ==
In 2012, Rauchwerger was named an IEEE Fellow "for contributions to thread-level speculation, parallelizing compilers, and parallel libraries".

His paper, "Adaptive Reduction Parallelization Techniques", was selected to be included in the ACM International Conference on Supercomputing 25th Anniversary Volume, 2014. It was one of 35 papers selected out of the 1800 papers published by this conference in the last 25 years.

His other notable awards include:

- Texas A&M Computer Science Graduate Faculty Teaching Award, 2014.
- Texas A&M College of Engineering Teaching, Service, and Contribution Award, 2014.
- Halliburton Professorship, College of Engineering, Texas A&M University, 2009.
- IBM Faculty Award, 2007 and 2008.
- Intel Faculty Award, 2005.
- NSF Faculty Early Career Development (CAREER) Award, 1998–2002.
- TEES Fellow, College of Engineering, Texas A&M University, 2002, 2005.
- TEES Select Young Faculty Award, College of Engineering, Texas A&M University, 2000.
