= Lydia Tapia =

American computer scientist

Lydia Tapia is an American computer scientist specializing in motion planning for robotics and molecular dynamics. She is a professor of computer science and the chair of the Department of Computer Science at the University of New Mexico.

== Education and career ==
Tapia is originally from Albuquerque; as a strong mathematics student at Sandia High School she became a participant in the New Mexico High School Supercomputing Challenge, and interned at Sandia National Laboratories. She went to Tulane University, initially intending to major in biomedical engineering but soon adding a second major in computer science and, by her junior year, switching entirely to computer science. At Tulane, she lists Johnette Hassell as a faculty mentor for her bachelor's thesis on women in computing. She graduated in 1998. After graduation, she began working at Sandia National Laboratories, before returning to graduate study at Texas A&M University.

During her graduate studies, at age 24, she experienced two strokes caused by a blood-clotting disorder, was hospitalized for three months, and had to undergo extensive therapy to retrain her motor skills; fortunately, her higher cognition was unaffected. She completed a Ph.D. in 2009, a year delayed, with the dissertation Intelligent Motion Planning and Analysis with Roadmap Methods for the Study of Complex and High-Dimensional Motion supervised by Nancy Amato.

After postdoctoral research on protein folding with Ron Elber at the University of Texas at Austin, she joined the University of New Mexico as an assistant professor in 2011. She was tenured as an associate professor in 2017 and promoted to full professor in 2022. Since 2022, she has chaired the university's Department of Computer Science.

== Recognition ==
Tapia was the 2015 recipient of the Denise Denton Emerging Leader Award of the Anita Borg Institute for Women in Technology, a 2016 recipient of a National Science Foundation CAREER Award, and the 2017 recipient of the Borg Early Career Award of the Computing Research Association.

The Texas A&M University Department of Computer Science and Engineering named Tapia as their 2019 Distinguished Former Student. The University of New Mexico named her as one of twelve faculty members to receive their 2021 Women in STEM awards.

== Personal life ==
Tapia is married to a data scientist whom she has known since middle school; they began dating in high school. They have one daughter.
