= EAEA =

EAEA or variant, may refer to:

- Ea Ea (1927–2021; born as Craige Schensted), U.S. mathematician and game designer
- "Eaea", the 2023 Spanish Eurovision song
- eaeA (gene), a gene that encodes for the protein Intimin
- European Association for the Education of Adults
- European Architectural Endoscopy Association
- Egyptian Atomic Energy Authority

== See also ==
- EA (disambiguation)
- AEA (disambiguation)
- EAE (disambiguation)
- AE (disambiguation)
