= EAA =

EAA may refer to:

== Education ==
- Education Achievement Authority, in Michigan
- Educational Assessment Australia
- Egypt Aviation Academy
- Escondido Adventist Academy, a school in California
- Estonian Academy of Arts

== Sport ==
- European Arenas Association
- European Athletic Association
- Atlantic 10 Conference, NCAA Division I conference formerly known as the Eastern Athletic Association
- Empire 8, NCAA Division III conference formerly known as the Empire Athletic Association
- Eastern Sports Club, a Hong Kong sports club also known as Eastern Athletic Association

== Science and medicine ==
- Essential amino acid
- Ethyl acetoacetate
- Excitatory amino acid
- Extrinsic allergic alveolitis

== Transport ==
- Eagle Airport, in Alaska
- East African Airways, defunct
- Electric Auto Association
- Experimental Aircraft Association

== Other uses ==
- Ecumenical Advocacy Alliance
- Emergency Architects Australia
- European American Armory, an American firearms company
- European Association of Archaeologists
- European Accessibility Act
- Everglades Agricultural Area, in Florida
- Karenggapa language

== See also ==
- EEA (disambiguation)
- EA (disambiguation)
- E2A (disambiguation)
