= AEA =

AEA or Aea may refer to:

== Mythology ==
- Aea (mythology), a mythological huntress
- Aeaea
- Aea, the main city of Colchis

== Businesses and organizations ==
=== Businesses ===
- AEA Investors, one of the oldest private equity firms in the US
- AEA Ribbon Mics, a US manufacturer of professional microphones
- AEA Technology, a British company mainly specialising in environmental consulting
- Air Europa (ICAO code)

=== Other organisations ===
- Academy of Entertainment Arts, a program at Dixie Hollins High School in St. Petersburg, Florida
- Actors' Equity Association, a U.S. labor union
- AeA, formerly known as the American Electronics Association, a non-profit technology trade association
- Aerial Experiment Association, an early aeronautical research organisation
- Aero Engineers Australia
- Alabama Education Association
- American Economic Association
- American Evaluation Association
- Associação de Escuteiros de Angola
- Association of European Airlines

== Places ==
- Aea (Malis), Greece
- Kutaisi, Georgia
- Abemama Airport in Gilbert Islands, Kiribati (IATA airport code AEA)

== Science and technology ==
- Air Entraining Agent; see Foam Index
- Arachidonoylethanolamide, an alternative name for Anandamide

== Other uses ==
- Advanced Extension Award, of the British educational system
- Airborne Electronic Attack, a European military project
- Alberta Emergency Alert, a public warning system
- Areba language (ISO 639-3 code)
- Autoerotic asphyxiation, a sexual act

== See also ==
- United Kingdom Atomic Energy Authority (UKAEA), a UK governmental nuclear research organisation
