= Sandra Morrison =

New Zealand academic

- Awards: International Adult and Continuing Education Hall of Fame

Academic background
- Education: University of Waikato

Sandra Lee Morrison is a New Zealand academic, and is a full professor at the University of Waikato, specialising in researching and advocating for adult education for diverse populations across the Asia Pacific region.

== Early life and education ==
Morrison affiliates with Ngāti Maniapoto, Ngāti Rarua, and Te Arawa iwi. As a child Morrison took part in performances of Māori singing and dancing for tourists, with her family, but did not enjoy it and preferred reading books, which she says got her 'hooked on learning'. She was the first in her family to graduate from university, and saw a 'ripple effect' through the family as they realised education was a route into better job opportunities. Morrison obtained a master's degree in 2002 of Māori and Pacific Development from the University of Waikato.

== Academic career ==
Morrison is on the faculty of the University of Waikato, where she was appointed as a full professor in 2022.

Morrison served from 2004 to 2008 as President of the Asia South Pacific Association for Basic and Adult Education. From 2008 she was elected President of the International Council for Adult Education. Morrison said her goals for her four-year term were to "reaffirm and strengthen that access to good quality education is a human right" and "to achieve greater recognition of the importance of education in sustainable development and this means taking into consideration the rights of women and those vulnerable groups. For example, the number of illiterate people is still unacceptable." Morrison co-founded the Indigenous, Maori and Pacific Adult Education Charitable Trust (IMPAECT) to develop cultural diverse approaches to education.

Morrison is part of the Deep South National Science Challenge, where she leads work on iwi relationships with the Southern and Antarctic oceans, Te Tai Uka a Pia, and leads the Vision Mātauranga work. She has written about the importance of the Treaty of Waitangi, and about iwi attitudes to climate change.

== Honours and awards ==
In 2009 Morrison was inducted into the University of Oklahoma’s International Adult and Continuing Education Hall of Fame. In 2011, she won an Ako Aotearoa award for Sustained Excellence in Tertiary Teaching.

== Selected works ==
=== Book ===
- Morrison, Sandra; Tarawa, N (2003). Reading our land: Case study of Te Waka Pu Whenua, Maori Adult Education Centre in New Zealand. Asian South Pacific Bureau of Adult Education.

=== Articles ===
- Munshi, Debashish; Priya A. Kurian; Raven Cretney; Sandra Morrison; Lyn Kathlene (2020). "Centering Culture in Public Engagement on Climate Change". Environmental Communication Yearbook. 14 (5): 573–581. doi:10.1080/17524032.2020.1746680. Wikidata Q121168822.
- Priya A. Kurian; Munshi, Debashish; Raven Cretney; Sandra Morrison; Lyn Kathlene (2021). "The cultural politics of climate change adaptation: an analysis of the tourism sector in Aotearoa New Zealand". Political Science. 73 (2): 143–160. doi:10.1080/00323187.2021.2021803. Wikidata Q121303204.
- Lyn Kathlene; Munshi, Debashish; Priya Kurian; Sandra L. Morrison (2022). "Cultures in the laboratory: mapping similarities and differences between Māori and non-Māori in engaging with gene-editing technologies in Aotearoa, New Zealand" (PDF). Humanities and Social Sciences Communications. 9 (1). doi:10.1057/s41599-022-01104-9. Wikidata Q124303384.
- Munshi, Debashish; Raven Cretney; Priya Kurian; Sandra L Morrison; Alvina Edwards (2022). "Culture and politics in overlapping frames for the future: Multi-dimensional activist organizing and communicating on climate change in Aotearoa New Zealand". Organization: 135050842211316. doi:10.1177/13505084221131641. Wikidata Q118151846.
- Maui Hudson; Aroha Te Pareake Mead; David Chagné; Nick Roskruge; Sandy Morrison; Phillip L Wilcox; Allan, Andrew Charles (2019). "Indigenous Perspectives and Gene Editing in Aotearoa New Zealand". Frontiers in Bioengineering and Biotechnology. 7: 70. doi:10.3389/fbioe.2019.00070. PMC 6470265. PMID 31032252. Wikidata Q64054610.
- Munshi, Debashish; Priya A. Kurian; Talei Morrison; Sandra L Morrison (2014). "Redesigning the architecture of policy-making: Engaging with Māori on nanotechnology in New Zealand". Public Understanding of Science. 25 (3): 287–302. doi:10.1177/0963662514548629. PMID 25193966. Wikidata Q50636345.
- Cameron, Michael Patrick; William Cochrane; Kellie McNeill; Pania Melbourne; Sandra L Morrison; Neville Robertson (2012). "Alcohol outlet density is related to police events and motor vehicle accidents in Manukau City, New Zealand". Australian and New Zealand Journal of Public Health. 36 (6): 537–542. doi:10.1111/j.1753-6405.2012.00935.x. PMID 23216494. Wikidata Q39507729.
- Sandra L. Morrison; Timote M. Vaioleti (2011). "Inclusion of indigenous peoples in CONFINTEA VI and follow-up processes" (PDF). International Review of Education. 57 (1–2): 69–87. doi:10.1007/s11159-011-9190-3. Wikidata Q124303385.
