= Verica Rupar =

Serbian journalist and professor in New Zealand

- Born: 17 March 1957 (age 69); Kostolac, Yugoslavia

Academic background
- Education: University of Waikato
- Thesis: Investigating the Journalistic Field:The Influence of Objectivity as a Journalistic Norm on the Public Debate on Genetic Engineering in New Zealand (2007)
- Doctoral advisor: Priya A. Kurian, Debashish Munshi

Academic work
- Institutions: Auckland University of Technology

Verica Rupar (born 17 March 1957) is a Serbian–New Zealand journalist and academic, and is professor of journalism at Auckland University of Technology (AUT).

== Academic career ==
Rupar earned an honours degree in political science at the University of Belgrade in Serbia. She worked as a political reporter and foreign correspondent for Politika covering Hungary, Serbia and Slovenia. Seeking greater stability, she moved to New Zealand, and in 2007 she completed a PhD titled Investigating the Journalistic Field:The Influence of Objectivity as a Journalistic Norm on the Public Debate on Genetic Engineering in New Zealand at the University of Waikato. Rupar then joined the faculty at AUT, rising to full professor in 2021.

Rupar's research is in the area of journalism studies. She says, "What motivates me now is the idea of public good, and the notion of public interest." She has written on media, politics and journalism in New Zealand, as well as commenting on international issues such as Zuckerberg's apology after the Cambridge Analytica scandal, and Trump's use of social media. In 2021 she edited the book Journalism and Meaning-making – Reading the Newspaper (Hampton Press), a collection of essays about "how journalism affects our public life". She said: "Journalism’s power to facilitate social inclusion and exclusion, has significant consequences on public life. At its highs, when performing the highest standards of profession, journalists can affirm tolerance, pluralism and social harmony actively contributing to the cultural changes in the society. At its lows, unethical journalism reinforces prejudices and stereotypes whose diffusion contribute to racism, hate speech, discrimination and violence."

In 2022, Rupar gave the 2022 Quaker Lecture in Christchurch, on 'The Search for Truth - Information, Disinformation and the Algorithms of Social Media'. The lecture was recorded and later broadcast on Plains FM.

Rupar is a consultant for the London-based Media Diversity Institute.

== Selected works ==
- Verica Rupar (2006). "How did you find that out? transparency of the newsgathering process and the meaning of news". Journalism Studies. 7 (1): 127–143. doi:10.1080/14616700500450426. Wikidata Q123411300.
- Verica Rupar (2007). "Newspapers' production of common sense". Journalism. 8 (5): 591–610. doi:10.1177/1464884907081056. Wikidata Q123411299.
- Munshi, Debashish; Kurian, Priya; Fraser, Rebecca; Verica Rupar (2013). "'Shadow publics' in the news coverage of socio-political issues". Journalism. 15 (1): 89–108. doi:10.1177/1464884912473393. Wikidata Q57842841.
- Grunwald, Ebbe; Verica Rupar (2009). "Journalism curiosity and story-telling frame". Journalism Practice. 3 (4): 392–403. doi:10.1080/17512780902798703. Wikidata Q123411297.
- Verica Rupar (2020). "Journalists as first responders". Kotuitui: New Zealand Journal Of Social Sciences Online. 15 (2): 349–359. doi:10.1080/1177083x.2020.1741405. Wikidata Q123411375.
- Verica Rupar (2002). "Keeping Our Options Closed: the Dominance of the Conflict Story-Telling Frame in Media Coverage of the Royal Commission's Report On Genetic Modification in New Zealand". Political Science. 54 (2): 59–67. doi:10.1177/003231870205400204. Wikidata Q123411374.
- Folker Hanusch; Tandoc, Edson; Dimitrakopoulou, Dimitra; Muchtar, Nurhaya; Rafter, Kevin; Márquez-Ramírez, Mireya; Verica Rupar; Sacco, Vittoria (2019). "10. Transformations: Journalists' Reflections on Changes in News Work". Worlds of Journalism: Journalistic Cultures Around the Globe. pp. 259–282. doi:10.7312/hani18642-011. Wikidata Q123411373.
- Basyouni Hamada; Hughes, Sallie; Hanitzsch, Thomas; Hollings, James; Lauerer, Corinna; Arroyave, Jesus; Verica Rupar; Splendore, Sergio (2019). "6. Editorial Autonomy: Journalists' Perceptions of Their Freedom". Worlds of Journalism: Journalistic Cultures Around the Globe. pp. 133–160. doi:10.7312/hani18642-007. Wikidata Q123411376.
