= EEA (disambiguation) =

EEA or Eea may refer to:

== Organisations ==
- European Economic Area
- European Environment Agency
- European Evangelical Alliance
- EEA Helicopter Operations, a Dutch subsidiary on CHC Helicopter

== Places ==
- River Eea, in Cumbria, England
- Eëa, an island in Greek mythology

== Economics ==
- Environmental-economic accounting
- Exchange Equalisation Account, the British Treasury's reserve fund

== Science and technology ==
- Electron affinity (E_{ea}), the energy required to detach an electron from a singly charged negative ion
- Equal environments assumption, an assumption underlying the methodology of the twin study
- Ethylene-ethyl acid, used in hot-melt adhesive
- Extended Euclidean algorithm
- Extreme event attribution, the science of quantifying the degree to which human-caused climate change contributes to extreme weather events

== Other uses ==
- Environment of evolutionary adaptedness, in evolutionary psychology
- Economic Espionage Act of 1996
- Early Entitlement Age, a way to collect retirement insurance benefits early under the Primary Insurance Amount

== See also ==
- EAA (disambiguation)
- EA (disambiguation)
- E2A (disambiguation)
- 2EA
