= Gameel Al-Batouti =

Egyptian aviator (1940–1999)

- جميل البطوطي
- Born: 2 February 1940; Kafr al-Dabusi, Dakahlia Governorate, Egypt
- Died: 31 October 1999 (aged 59); Atlantic Ocean, near Nantucket, Massachusetts, U.S.
- Cause of death: Suicide by plane crash
- Other names: Gamil El Batouti, El Batouty
- Occupations: Pilot and flight instructor
- Known for: First Officer of EgyptAir Flight 990
- Motive: Possible revenge for reprimanding for inappropriate behaviour

Details
- Killed: 216
- Injured: 0

Gameel Al-Batouti (Arabic: جميل البطوطي; (Note: also rendered "Gamil El Batouti" or "El Batouty" in U.S. official reports) 2 February 1940 – 31 October 1999) was a pilot for EgyptAir and a former officer for the Egyptian Air Force. On 31 October 1999, he and all 216 other passengers and crew on board EgyptAir Flight 990 were killed when the Boeing 767-300ER he was piloting crashed into the Atlantic Ocean about 60 miles (100 km) southeast of Nantucket Island, Massachusetts. The US National Transportation Safety Board (NTSB) concluded and stated that the crash was caused by a series of deliberate flight control inputs to the aircraft made by Al-Batouti, while being alone in the cockpit and in the position of relief first officer. Investigators learned from another EgyptAir pilot that Al-Batouti was supposedly reprimanded for repeated inappropriate behaviour with female guests at the Hotel Pennsylvania, a New York City hotel often used by EgyptAir crews, by an EgyptAir official who was a passenger on the flight.

== Early life ==
Al-Batouti was born in the farming community of Kafr al-Dabusi, a village of Sherbin, Dakahlia Governorate. His father was a mayor and a landowner, and family members were well educated and affluent.

== Career ==
Al-Batouti had been conscripted into the Egyptian Air Force, where he was trained as a pilot and flight instructor. He then worked for a time as an instructor at the Egypt Aviation Academy. His position there was described by one colleague as "high profile."

While in the Air Force, Al-Batouti served as a pilot in both the 1967 Six-Day War and the 1973 Yom Kippur War.

Al-Batouti was hired by EgyptAir on 8 September 1987. He held type ratings for the Boeing 737-200, Boeing 767-200 and the 767-300. At the time of the crash, he had logged 12,538 hours of flight time, with 5,755 as pilot in command and 5,191 in the 767.

Al-Batouti was approaching mandatory retirement (aviation regulations prevented him from flying as a commercial airline pilot after age 60), and had planned to split his time between a 10-bedroom villa outside of Cairo and a beach house near El Alamein.

At the time of his death, Al-Batouti was the most senior first officer flying the 767 at EgyptAir. He had not been promoted to captain because he declined to sit for the exam for his Airline Transport Pilot Licence (ATPL) rating. The ATPL study materials and exam are conducted in English, the international language of aviation, and Al-Batouti did not have sufficient English proficiency. Once he reached 55, the possibility of promotion was further hindered by EgyptAir policy which prevented promotions after that age. According to statements made by his colleagues to the NTSB during the Flight 990 investigation, he did not want to be promoted because, as senior first officer, he could get his preferred flight schedules, which assisted with his family situation. Despite not being promoted to captain, he was often called by that title because of his previous experience at the Egypt Aviation Academy.

Investigators learned from another EgyptAir pilot that Al-Batouti was supposedly reprimanded for repeated inappropriate behaviour with female guests at the Hotel Pennsylvania, a New York City hotel often used by EgyptAir crews. Hatem Roushdy, the EgyptAir official said to be responsible for the alleged reprimand, was a passenger on Flight 990. Investigators confirmed that shortly before the flight, Roushdy revoked Al-Batouti's privilege of flying to the United States and informed him that Flight 990 would be his last on the route.

== EgyptAir Flight 990 ==
While Al-Batouti was momentarily alone in the cockpit when Captain Ahmed El-Habashi went to the lavatory, the aircraft suddenly went into a rapid dive nose-first, resulting in weightlessness (zero-g) throughout the cabin. Despite this, Captain El-Habashi was able to re-enter the cockpit. The speed of the 767 was now dangerously close to breaking the sound barrier, exceeding its design limits and beginning to weaken its airframe. The captain pulled back on his control column and applied full power to the engines, but neither action had any effect due to the aircraft's speed and the engines having been shut down. The captain then deployed the speedbrakes, which slowed the aircraft's dive, bringing it back to a safer speed. However, these abrupt maneuvers resulted in the aircraft entering a steep climb, causing g-forces to push the passengers and crew into their seats. Both engines then stopped completely, causing the aircraft to lose all electrical power and both flight recorders to stop at this point. The aircraft then fell into another steep dive and huge mechanical stress caused the left engine to separate from the wing. The aircraft began to break apart in midair at 10,000 ft (3,000 m) and debris crashed into the Atlantic Ocean at 1:52 am EST. All 217 people on board were killed.

Some of Al-Batouti's final recorded words on the cockpit voice recorder (CVR) were "Tawkalt ala Allah" (Arabic: توكلت على الله), which can be translated as "I rely on God", 11 times. This phrase can also be interpreted as "I put my trust in God", hinting that he knew he was facing death, giving he could have been trying to deliberately crash the aircraft.

The Egyptian Civil Aviation Authority disputes the cause of the crash, blaming mechanical problems rather than any action by Al-Batouti.

There was Western media speculation that Al-Batouti may have been a terrorist, although his family and friends indicated that he had no strong political beliefs.

== Personal life ==
Al-Batouti was married and had five children. The youngest, a daughter who was 10 at the time of the crash, suffered from lupus, and was undergoing medical treatment in Los Angeles. Efforts had been made at EgyptAir, both at a company level and at an employee level, to provide assistance to help defray the medical expenses.

== In popular culture ==
Season 3, episode 8 of the Canadian television series Mayday titled "Death and Denial", dramatizes the events and investigation of EgyptAir Flight 990. Gameel Al-Batouti was portrayed by Canadian actor Elias Zarou.
