= E2A =

E2A may refer to:

- E2A peptide, a 2A self-cleaving peptides.
- E2A immunoglobulin enhancer-binding factors E12/E47.
- Chūgoku Expressway and Kanmon Bridge, route E2A in Japan.

== See also ==
- 2EA
- EAA (disambiguation)
- EEA (disambiguation)
- EA (disambiguation)
