= Alan Tuckett =

British adult education specialist (born 1948)

Sir Alan John Tuckett, OBE (born 3 April 1948) is a British adult education specialist and campaigner. He was the Chief Executive of the National Institute of Adult Continuing Education (NIACE) from 1988 to 2011, and President of the International Council for Adult Education from 2011 to 2015. He is currently Professor of Education at the University of Wolverhampton.

In 2020, the DAAD (German Academic Exchange Service) founded with means of the BMBF (German Federal Ministry of Education and Research) a guest professorship for Tuckett at the university of Würzburg.

He was educated at Launceston College, Cornwall and graduated with a first class degree in English and American Literature from the University of East Anglia in 1969.

Tuckett was appointed an Officer of the Order of the British Empire (OBE) in the 1995 Birthday Honours for services to adult further education. He was appointed a Knight Bachelor in the 2018 New Year Honours for services to education, particularly adult learning.
