= EAE =

EAE can refer to:

- EAE Business School, in Barcelona, Spain
- Enuma Anu Enlil (𒌓𒀭𒈾𒀭𒂗𒆤𒇲), a major series of about 70 clay tablets dealing with Babylonian astrology, with origins in the Old Babylonian period (1950–1595 BCE)
- EAE Editorial Académica Española, a German publishing company
- Encyclopaedia Aethiopica, a reference work
- European Air Express, a defunct German airline
- Eusko Abertzale Ekintza, a Basque political party
- Evangelistic Association Of The East, an NGO founded in 1924 at Perumbavoor
- Experimental autoimmune encephalomyelitis
- Siwo Airport, in Vanuatu
