= International Council for Adult Education =

International educational organization

The International Council for Adult Education (ICAE) is an international partnership of individuals and organizations interested in adult learning and adult education. Their mission is to promote adult learning as an important tool for informed participation in civil society and sustainable development.

== History ==
In 1972, the International Council for Adult Education (ICAE) was established by J. Roby Kidd, with headquarters in Toronto, Ontario.

The first World Assembly on Adult Education and Development occurred in Dar es Salaam in 1976, four years after ICAE was established.

== Structure ==
The ICAE is governed by a nine-member executive committee, whose members are elected every four years at the General Assembly, a meeting of all members.

== Regional organizations ==
ICAE has seven regional organizations: the North American Alliance for Popular and Adult Education (NAAPAE), Caribbean Regional Council for Adult Education (CARCAE), Consejo de Educacion de Adultos de Americano Latino (CEAAL), European Association for the Education of Adults (EAEA), Arab Network for Literacy and Adult Education (ANLAE), Pan African Association for Literacy and Adult Education (PAALAE), and Asian-South Pacific Bureau of Adult Education (ASPBAE).

== Meetings ==
The ICAE meets annually in locations around the world, and once every five or six years holds a World Assembly on Adult Education. The first was in 1976 in Dar es Salaam; others have been held in Buenos Aires (1985), Bangkok (1990), Cairo (1995), Ocho Rios (2001), and Nairobi (2007).

== Awards ==
The ICAE sponsors three awards annually: the J. Roby Kidd Award, the Nita Barrow Award, and the Nabila Breir Award. J. Roby Kidd was a Canadian adult educator and Secretary General of ICAE (1973–1979); this award recognizes innovators in the field. Dame Nita Barrow was a Caribbean adult educator, President of ICAE and Governor-general of Barbados; this award recognizes individuals and organizations that have made a significant contribution to women's education and empowerment. Nabila Breir, a Palestinian, was an active member of the ICAE's Women's Programme and dedicated to improving adult education for women in her home country and neighboring areas; she was murdered in Beirut in 1986. The award named in her honor recognizes those who have contributed to the education of Palestinian women.

== Notable people ==
- Alan Tuckett, President of the ICAE from 2011 to 2015
- Sandra Morrison, President of ICAE from 2008 to 2012.
