= Phasis (mythology) =

River god in Greek mythology

In Greek and Roman mythology, Phasis (Ancient Greek: Φᾶσις, romanized: Phâsis) is one of the numerous river-gods, deities presiding over rivers. He is the personification of the mythical river Phasis in the mythical land of Aea, which eventually came to be associated with the river now known as the Rioni, the principal river of the kingdom of Colchis in the southeastern Caucasus. Tales related to Phasis survive in the works of late-antiquity authors.

== Family and attributes ==
In Hesiod's Theogony, Phasis is one of the three hundred divine river-gods, sons of the Titans Oceanus and Tethys, although in other authors he is the son of the sun-god Helios by the Oceanid Ocyrrhoë. The third-century BC Greek historian Mnaseas wrote that Phasis was the father of Colchus, who gave his name to the Colchians.

The Phasis, now called Rioni, flows in Georgia in the south Caucasus. Philostratus the Younger described Phasis as grim-looking, with thick hair, a beard and glaring eyes.

== Mythology ==
In a pseudo-Plutarchic work that might have been paradoxographical or parodic in nature, Phasis the son of Helios caught his mother Ocyrrhoë in bed with another man, and in anger he killed her. He was then pursued by the Furies for his matricide, and driven mad by their pursuit, he flung himself into the river Arcturus (“bear-guard”), which was called Phasis after him thereafter.

As a river, at some point he was strongly infatuated with a Colchian huntress, Aea. He chased the girl relentlessly in frenzied desire as she shot arrows against him in vain, but her stamina soon failed her. Phasis caught up with her and bound her beneath his waves. The implication is that Aea eventually turned into Aea, the mythic island where Aeëtes lived. The incident was later depicted in the halls of Aeëtes's palace in Colchis.

Once they reached the northeastern coast of Asia Minor and the Caucasus, the Argonauts rowed up the river Phasis to reach their destination of Colchis and the Golden Fleece.

== Symbolism ==
During the archaic era, Aea was seen as a mythical island on the eastern edge of the world, where Aeëtes' kingdom stood. Better understanding of the Black Sea geography resulted in Aea (and also the town Phasis, on the banks of the homonymous river, and seat of king Aeëtes) being shifted to Colchis and the river that is now Rioni, and thus connecting it with the sea.

In a way, Phasis' rape of Aea invokes parallels with the encounter of Medea and Jason themselves, as Jason takes Medea away from her father and they consummate their union in the same island as another nymph was raped by a river god. Furthermore, Jason's speech to Medea parallelises Ovid's rendition of the Hermaphroditus and Salmacis story, which involved the imagery of violence in the water.

== See also ==
- Daphne
- Alpheus
- Phaethon

== Bibliography ==
- Avery, Catherine B., ed. (1962). New Century Classical Handbook. New York, US: Appleton-Century-Crofts.
- Bell, Robert E. (1991). Women of Classical Mythology: A Biographical Dictionary. ABC-Clio. ISBN 9780874365818.
- Dräger, Paul (October 1, 2006). "Phasis". In Cancik, Hubert; Schneider, Helmuth (eds.). Brill's New Pauly. Translated by Christine F. Salazar. Trier: Brill Reference Online. ISSN 1574-9347.
- Hard, Robin (2004). The Routledge Handbook of Greek Mythology: Based on H.J. Rose's "Handbook of Greek Mythology". Routledge. ISBN 9780415186360.
- Hesiod, Theogony, in The Homeric Hymns and Homerica with an English Translation by Hugh G. Evelyn-White, Cambridge, MA., Harvard University Press; London, William Heinemann Ltd. 1914. Online version at the Perseus Digital Library.
- Marks, Raymond (2024). Off the Beaten Path: Ovidian Journeys in Valerius Flaccus’ ›Argonautica‹. De Gruyter. ISBN 9783111403045.
- Grimal, Pierre (1987). The Dictionary of Classical Mythology. Wiley-Blackwell. ISBN 0-631-13209-0.
- Philostratus the Younger, Imagines, translated by Arthur Fairbanks. Loeb Classical Library 256. Cambridge, MA: Harvard University Press, 1931. Loeb Classical Library.
- Plutarch, De fluviis in Plutarch's Morals, translated from the Greek by several hands. Corrected and revised by. William W. Goodwin, PH. D. Boston. Little, Brown, and Company. Cambridge. Press Of John Wilson and son. 1874. 5 Available at Perseus Digital Library.
- Stoll, Heinrich Wilhelm (1909). Roscher, Wilhelm Heinrich (ed.). Ausführliches Lexikon der griechischen und römischen Mythologie [Detailed dictionary of Greek and Roman mythology] (in German). Vol. III: N–P. Leipzig: Teubner-Verlag.
- Scholia in Theocritum vetera, compiled by Carl Wendel in Lipsiae, in aedibus B.G. Teubneri. 1914. Archive.
- Smith, William (1873). A Dictionary of Greek and Roman Biography and Mythology. London, UK: John Murray, printed by Spottiswoode and Co. Online version at the Perseus.tufts library.
- Valerius Flaccus, Argonauticon. Otto Kramer. Leipzig. Teubner. 1913. Latin text available at the Perseus Digital Library.
