= Adult education =

Any form of learning adults engage in beyond traditional schooling

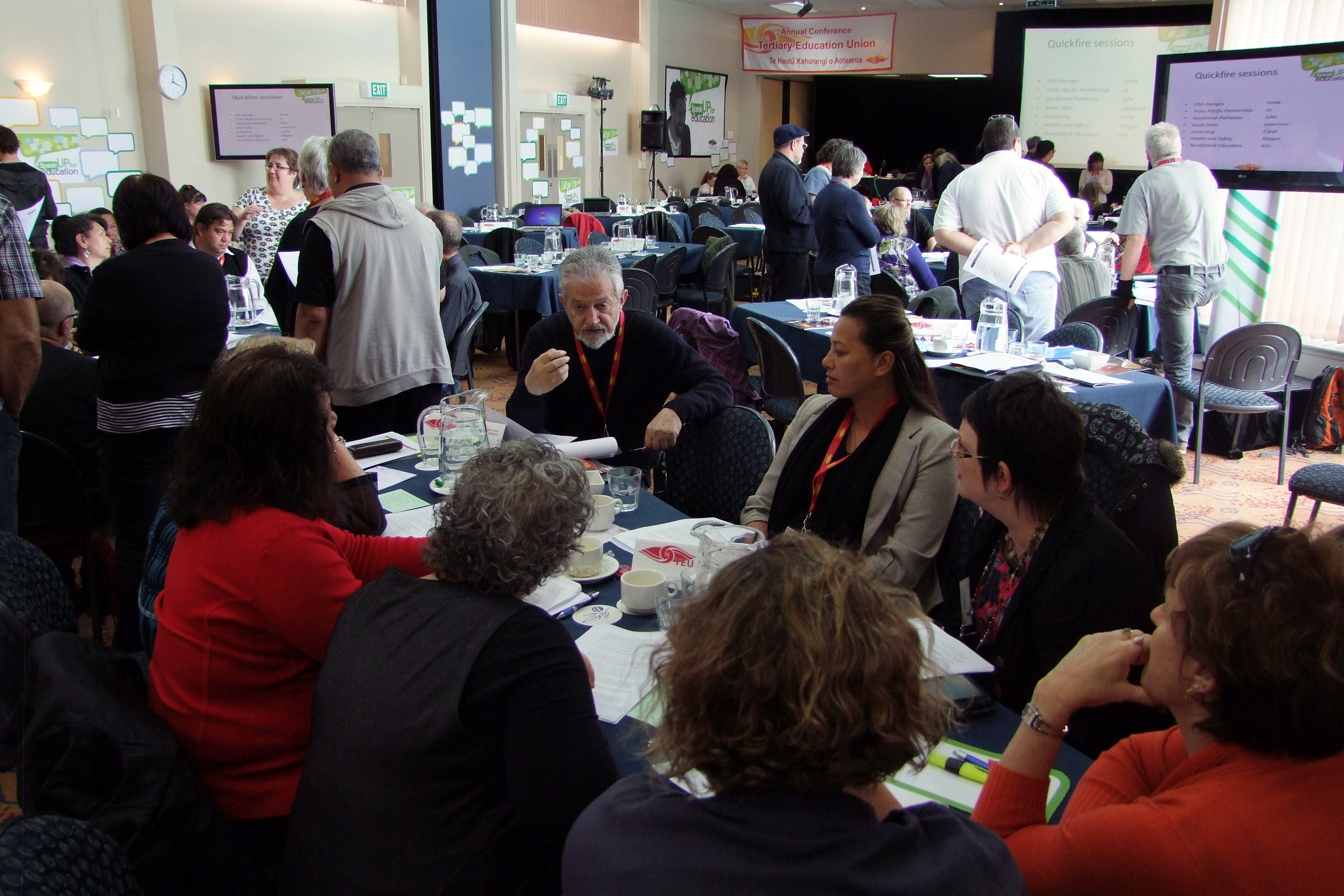
Exemplary situation – a workshop, the Tertiary Education Union (TEU) Annual Conference in Wellington, New Zealand in 2012

Adult education is when adults gain new attitudes, knowledge, skills, or values through systematic educating activities. It includes any form of learning adults engage in beyond traditional schooling, from basic literacy to developing self-actualization as a lifelong learner. "[I]t reflects a specific philosophy about learning and teaching based on the assumption that adults can and want to learn, that they are able and willing to take responsibility for that learning, and that the learning itself should respond to their needs." Their end goal(s), available opportunities, and how they learn are affected by demographics, globalization and technology.

Adult learning, which can have a large variance in how it is accomplished, can be in any and multiple of these three contexts:

- Formal – Structured learning that typically takes place in an education or training institution, usually with a set curriculum and carries credentials;
- Non-formal – Learning that is organized by educational institutions but non credential. Non-formal learning opportunities may be provided in the workplace and through the activities of civil society organizations and groups;
- Informal education – Learning that goes on all the time, resulting from daily life activities related to work, family, community or leisure (e.g. community baking class).

The World Bank's 2019 World Development Report on The Changing Nature of Work argues that adult learning is an important channel to help readjust workers' skills to fit in the future of work and suggests ways to improve its effectiveness.

== Characteristics ==
The practice of adult education is referred to as andragogy to distinguish it from the traditional school-based education for children (pedagogy). The purposes and methods of adult education are diverse. In a college or university the aim is typically related to personal growth or learning skills to improve employment options. Adult education that focuses specifically on the workplace is often referred to as human resource development. Another possible motivation is to challenge or sustain certain values for their democratic society. Outside of required training for specific employee positions adult education is voluntary.

=== Availability ===
In countries with advanced systems of adult education, professional development is available through post-secondary institutions and provide professional development through their ministry of education or school boards and through nongovernmental organizations. In addition, there are programs about adult education for existing and aspiring practitioners offered, at various academic levels, by universities, colleges, and professional organizations.

Adult educators have long maintained commitments to racial justice and other forms of social justice struggle which included extensive work at Freedom Schools during the Civil Rights Movement. Contemporary commitments to racial justice in adult education include initiatives in the workplace and beyond.

=== Advantages ===
Educating adults differs from educating children in several ways given that adults have accumulated knowledge and work experience which can add to the learning experience.

=== Cognitive differences ===
In a study, Greenberg compared the orthographic and phonological skills of functionally illiterate adults and children. The study found that although functionally illiterate adults performed similarly in reading tasks, children were more successful in vocabulary and spelling tests. This means that functional illiterate adults are at a similar level of education as children, yet they differ in strengths of different skills.

=== Disadvantages ===
Adults "are more likely to experience this fear of failure, which can heighten [their] anxiety, especially if [their] experience of education in the past was not always positive."

== Objectives ==
Adult education can be for vocational, social, recreational, or self-development. It can also be a form of social justice to provide accessible education to the disadvantaged. Adult education is based on a government's social policies. Continuing education can help adults maintain certifications, fulfill job requirements, and stay up-to-date on new developments in their field.

As the socio-economics of society progress so does the requirements of human quality. In the 1960s, the proposition of "lifelong education" was put forward, which led to the change of contemporary educational concepts. Therefore, its ultimate goal might be to achieve human fulfillment. The goal might also be to achieve an institution's needs. For example, this might include improving its operational effectiveness and productivity. A larger scale goal of adult education may be the growth of society by enabling its citizens to keep up with societal change and maintain good social order.

One fast-growing sector of adult education is English for speakers of other languages (ESOL), also referred to as English as a second language (ESL) or English language learners (ELL). These courses are key in assisting immigrants with not only the acquisition of the English language, but the acclimation process to the culture of the United States as well as other English speaking countries like Canada, Australia, and New Zealand.

== Theories ==
=== Eduard C. Lindeman's theories ===
Eduard C. Lindeman was the first expert who gave a systematic account of adult education. In his theory of education, education is regarded as a lifelong process. He pointed out that due to the constant development and change of social life and the surrounding environment, knowledge, and information are in a cycle of constant transmission, supplement and update, which requires people to keep learning to adapt to the changes in the outside world. At the same time, he believes that adult learners should not only learn for the needs of work and survival, but also have the opportunity to enrich themselves. He insists that adult education is an inspiring life-changing tool. Adult education should not only help people improve their skills and abilities in work, but also guide people to find happiness outside work.

Otherwise, Lindeman also proposed that the most valuable resource for adult learners is the learner's experience. He believes that the purpose of adult education is to give meaning to all kinds of experience. Experience can enhance learners' autonomous learning and cognitive ability.

In addition, Lindeman believes that adult education is an important means of improving society. The basic function of adult education is to promote the physical and mental development of adult learners. He argues that adult education is a powerful tool for social activists. Through adult education, the personal code of conduct and cultural knowledge of adult learners should be improved to gradually improve the social atmosphere and order.

=== Andragogy ===
Like with this knitting, andragogy involves adding new connections to a current structure of knowledge.

In the 1970s Malcolm Knowles introduced andragogy as the central theory of adult learning, defining andragogy as “the art and science of helping adults learn. Andragogy is based on using the neurological and cultural differences in how adults learn to improve the quality of their education.

Knowles's andragogy theory posits that adults create new and strengthen current knowledge from previous experiences. Andragogy involves planning coursework directly related to how the student will apply the content in their life. This brings an ever-expanding experience to use as an educational resource. Teachers who use andragogy theory to design coursework find their students progress faster and are more successful in reaching their goals.

Andragogy proposes six main assumptions about adults learners:

1. As people mature, their self-concept moves from dependence toward self-direction;
2. Adults have accumulated rich experiences through family responsibilities, work-related activities, and prior education;
3. Adults' readiness to learn is closely connected to the developmental tasks of his or her social role;
4. Adult learners prefer immediate application of knowledge;
5. Adults' motivation to learn derive from internal drives rather than external ones;
6. Adults need to know why they need to learn something.

Knowles suggests these characteristics should be taken into consideration when designing programs for adults and facilitating adult learning processes.

He also proposed a model of self-directed learning. In Knowles's view, self-directed learning is a process in which individuals actively diagnose their learning needs, propose learning goals, select and implement appropriate learning strategies, and evaluate learning results.

== Challenges and motivating factors ==
=== Characteristics of non-participating adults in education ===
Previous research findings suggest that as adults get older, they are less likely to participate in AE (adult education). The International Adult Literacy Survey (IALS), nationally representative samples of adults aged 16–65 in 23 OECD countries, has found that older age groups had lower participation rates than younger age groups. Particularly, adults aged 16 to 25 were on average about three times more likely to participate than older adults aged 56 to 65.

Eurobarometer survey, national representative samples of adult aged 15 to 65 of European Union countries, also revealed that adults in the three youngest age groups examined (ages 15–24, ages 25–39, and ages 40–54) were more likely to participate in AE than age group of 55+. Moreover, the Eurobarometer survey shows that participation rate declined from younger to older adults. Participation rate of European countries was 59% for adults aged 15–24. The rate began to decline 38% for adults aged 25–39 and it also fell down to 31% for adults aged 40–54. Participation rate was 17% for adults above 55. Reason of why older adults' participation declined relates mainly to lack of promotion and support. When people get old, their chances to take promotion for any AE programs are reduced.

In many OECD and European countries, employers often support their workers to attend in AE programs since they consider that workers with higher-educated and skilled are crucial indicators of development for companies. Therefore, older adults cannot get promotions from their employers because of the gradual loss of seniority, learning ability and performance. Since older adults are rarely offered a promotion from their employers, and the cost would be an obstacle for participation, they are unable to take the courses even if they wanted to take part in programs. Moreover, lack of motivation and unavailability of learning opportunities could be additional reasons of older adults' low-participation).

Findings of previous research are quite mixed when participation in AE comes to gender. According to the IALS, there is no a statistically significant difference between men and women in AE. However, the average participation rate of men was a bit higher than women. It was 38.7% for men and 37.9% for women. The Eurobarometer survey shows a similar result to the IALS data. Specifically the average participation of males was 35%; while, it was 30% for females. Women's low participation is mainly resulted from family burdens and lack of financial support. However, an opposite tendency can be observed in the US. A study based on National Household Education Survey [NCES] in 2001 revealed that although gender difference did not exist much, females were more likely to participate in AE than males in the US. The participation rate was 49% for women and 43% for men.

Educational attainment is determined as the most important factor in predicting participation in AE. It is known that those with higher levels of educational attainment participate more in AE programs.

The IALS showed that there was a clear relationship between previous educational attainment and participation in AE. The data found those with low educational background were less likely to participate in OECD countries. Specifically, the participation rate was 57.6% for adults who completed college or university education; while, it was 15.5% for adults who did not complete high school.

The Eurobarometer survey also showed that 87% of low-educated people belonged to the non-participant group. Reason of low or non-participation of the less-educated can be explained from perspectives of individual and employers. Individual point illustrated that low self-confidence regarding the learning, which mainly derived from previous bad educational experiences, could be a major obstacle for the less-educated. Apart from low self-confidence, those less-educated might not perceive their need of participation or might actually not have a need to participate. Yet, employers' view was apparent that they tended to support high-educated because they were more trainable than the low-educated. Therefore, the participation of the less-educated was low since they could not get promotions from their employers.

Finally, adults who come from a better socio-economic background tend to participate more in AE programs. The OECD data showed that higher the parent' educational level could produce the higher participation rate.

Summarizing above findings, people, those are young and men, with high levels of education, high-status of jobs are more likely to take part in any form of education and training. On the contrary, typical non-participants tend to be women, older, less educated, and coming from poor socio-economic backgrounds. In addition, less-skilled, unemployed, immigrants, language minorities, and rural residents are less likely to participate in AE programs.

=== Deterring factors for participation in education ===
Deterrents are characteristics that explain why adults respond in negative manners to participate in education and learning. Deterrents faced by adults are multifaceted, including both external and internal factors. However, cost and time have been remained as the most frequently reported deterrents. Large sampled (nationwide and international) surveys on barriers to participation such as a study of National Center for Education Statistics (NCES) of the US, IALS and Eurobarometer indicated that time and cost were the main deterrents for adults. Moreover, some empirical studies discovered time and cost as the most cited deterrents through studying various groups of adults. Cost includes tuition fee of a program as well as extra expenditures for learning such as clothes, food, transportation and other school necessities (textbooks and stationaries).

It is well known that adults less educated, low-skilled and unemployed are less likely to participate in education/learning. For the unemployed, it is obvious that cost can hinder their participation in education. And those lacking education and skills must be paid low salaries. In this way, cost could be the most influential deterrent. Even employed adults seem not wanting to invest money for a course, but they could attend if their employers supported them financially. For the time barrier, most adults involved in the above-mentioned studies reported that they could not participate in educational activities due to lack of time. Adults tended to say that they were busy with their daily routines.

Apart from cost and time deterrents, family and job commitments are other most commonly cited deterrents. The large sampled surveys and empirical studies as mentioned earlier revealed that adults tended to report family and job responsibilities as deterrents and rated right after the cost and time deterrents. However, Milana suggested that busy workload and family responsibilities can be associated with the time barrier, otherwise time barrier itself is a vague concept. Adults feel they do not have time to learn because they are busy at work and home. Thus, the time barrier should be considered in line with family and job commitments.

After above-mentioned deterrents, another mostly reported deterrent is irrelevant and inadequate supplies of trainings/activities. In other words, AE programs and courses do not always suit the needs of adult learners. It, therefore, is also important for educational planners to recognize that AE opportunities available may not always suit the learner's need.

Deterrents related to an individual's internal issues tend to be reported in lowest rate. For example, the IALS showed that the least deterrent was lack of self-confidence. Also, the Eurobarometer survey indicated that adults’ perception of being too old to learn was the least significant deterrent.

Moreover, perceived deterrents are differentiated into social groups. Johnstone and Rivera found that older adults faced more dispositional barriers such as low self-confidence and too late for being learners. Also, younger adults and women were more experienced with situational barriers such as cost and child care arrangements. Among the less educated, one's low-confidence regarding the learning ability could be the main deterrent.

Meanwhile, research illustrates that understanding the motivations and barriers of adult learners can increase their enrollment and retention. Additional research shows that adult learners are more motivated in the classroom when they can clearly identify the application of their education to their professional or personal experiences. When instructors recognize their students' characteristics, they can develop lessons that address both the strengths and the needs of each student. Adults that are motivated, have confidence, and positive self-esteem are more likely to develop into lifelong learners.

In fast-developing countries, the qualifications of adults fall far behind those of young people, and may no longer match the requirements of a developed economy. This implies strong potential demand for the education and training of adults. This demand needs to be met through flexible modes of study which are suitable for adults, avenues of access that recognize informal prior learning, and the supports necessary for adults with limited formal education to succeed in further study.

=== Functional illiteracy ===
Functional illiteracy is the inability to use reading, writing, and calculation skills to contribute to the development of personal and societal growth. The person may have some knowledge, but not enough to understand and interact with the world which expects basic literacy.

Examples of what may be difficult for the functionally illiterate:

- filling out a job application
- reading a doctor prescription
- understanding statistics presented in a news article

== Benefits ==
Adult education can have many benefits ranging from better health and personal well-being to greater social inclusion. It can also support the function of democratic systems and provide greater opportunities for finding new or better employment. Adult education has been shown to have a positive impact on the economy.

Adult education provides opportunities for personal growth, goal fulfillment & socialization. Chris McAllister's research of semi-structured interviews with older adult learners shows a motivation to communicate with people and to get out of the house to keep mentally active. Researchers have documented the social aspects of older adult education.

Friendship was described as an important aspect of adult learning. The classroom is seen as a part of their social network. In recent studies, the friendships that are made between adults seem to have an increasing effect on their social structure as a whole.

The development of social networks and support was found to be a key motivation of adult learners. As editor of a book entitled Adult Education and Health, Leona English claims that including health education as part of adult education makes for a healthier community.

When surveying adult education programs in Japan, Nojima found that classes focusing on hobbies and very specific recreational activities were by far the most popular. The author noted that more time, money and resources needed to be in place so participants would be able to take advantage of these types of activities. Withnall explored the influences on later life learning in various parts in the U.K. Results were similar in that later in life education afforded these older adults opportunities to socialize. Some experts claim that adult education has a long-term impact on the economy and that there is a correlation between innovation and learning at the workplace.

Recently, adult education has gained recognition and importance in broader educational policies which emphasise inclusive and equitable education for all. However, there has been a shift towards a narrow focus on vocational skills, undermining the transformative potential of adult education. Looking to the future, adult learning needs to extend beyond labor market needs, connecting career change and reskilling to broader educational reforms. Lifelong learning should be reconceptualized as transformative and responsive to societal changes. It is crucial to address the participation and inclusion of vulnerable groups, appreciate informal learning, embrace digital means of participation, and promote scientific literacy while combating misinformation. Adult education plays a vital role in enhancing competencies, fostering responsibility, understanding changing paradigms, and shaping a just and sustainable world, emphasizing intergenerational solidarity.

Grants

Most post secondary education is eligible for the following grants-

- Adult Education and Family Literacy Act (AEFLA) Grants – These grants are administered through the U.S. Department of Education and support programs that provide adult education, literacy, and English language acquisition services. AEFLA funding is aimed at helping adults who need to improve basic skills, obtain a high school diploma, or prepare for postsecondary education.
- The Pell Grant – While primarily known for supporting undergraduate students, the Pell Grant can be used by eligible adult learners attending accredited institutions to pursue a variety of programs, including adult education and workforce development programs. The grant is based on financial need and does not have to be repaid.
- The Adult Skills Grant (ASG) – Some regions offer Adult Skills Grants to support working adults who are seeking to advance their skills through training, certification, or further education. These grants are often designed to help learners gain the qualifications needed for in-demand jobs.
- State-Specific Adult Education Grants – Many U.S. states offer their own grants for adult learners, often through community colleges or state-sponsored adult education programs. These can include financial assistance for GED preparation, English as a Second Language (ESL) programs, or career training courses.

== Monitoring ==
=== Global Reports on Adult Learning and Education (GRALE) ===
Global Reports on Adult Learning and Education (GRALE) are a series of reports that monitor progress on Adult Learning and Education (ALE), promote action, identify trends in the field of ALE, and explore solutions to challenges. GRALE play a key role in meeting UNESCO's commitment to monitor and report on countries' implementation of the Belém Framework for Action. This Framework was adopted by 144 UNESCO Member States at the Sixth International Conference on Adult Learning and Education (CONFINTEA VI), which was held in Belém, Brazil, in 2009. In the Belém Framework for Action, countries agreed to improve ALE across five areas of action: policy; governance; financing; participation, inclusion and equity; and quality.

=== Adult and youth literacy rate ===
As of 2019, the global youth literacy rate is 91%, meaning 102 million youth lack basic literacy skills. In low-income countries, one in three young people still cannot read.

The adult literacy rate as of 2019 is 86%, which means 750 million adults lack basic literacy skills. There are 92 literate women for every 100 literate men globally, and in low-income countries, as few as 77 literate women for every 100 literate men. The literacy rate is expected to continue to grow steadily in countries in all income groups.

At the global level, the youth literacy rate is expected to reach 94% by 2030 and the adult literacy rate 90%. In low-income countries, less than 70% of adults and slightly more than 80% of youth aged 15 to 24 years are projected to have basic literacy skills by 2030.

Adult Education Obstacles

Adult education is the challenge of balancing learning with other life responsibilities. Many learners juggle education with full time jobs, family, and financial pressures. These factors make it difficult to prioritize and engage consistently in studying.

== See also ==
=== By geographic region ===
- Education in Africa
- Adult education in China
- Adult education in the United Kingdom
  - Adult Learning Wales – Registered charity and adult education provider

=== Other information ===
- Adult high school – Secondary school operated to serve adult students
- Andragogy – Methods and principles in adult education
- Autodidacticism, also known as Heutagogy – Independent education without the guidance of teachers
- Bullying of students in higher education
- Community college – Form of undergraduate higher education in parts of Canada and the United States
- Community education – Education centered on dialogue and communication
- Continuing education – Education after initial education
- Dialogue education – Education approach described by Jane Vella
- Distance education – Mode of delivering education to students who are not physically present
- Educational technology – Use of technology in education to enhance learning and teaching (the use of electronic educational technology is also called e-learning)
- Environmental adult education
- Folk high school – Type of adult education institution, in Scandinavia and Germany
- Folkbildning – Education out of traditional schooling systems, aiming at transforming society, community education through learning circles in Scandinavia
- Geragogy – Science of education of older adults
- International Society for Comparative Adult Education – Comparative education
- Life skills – Abilities for adaptive and positive behavior
- Lifelong learning – Ongoing, voluntary, and self-motivated pursuit of knowledge
- Literacy – Ability to read and write
- Open University – Public research university in the UK
- Open university – Public research university in the UK (general concept)
- Part-time learner in higher education – Non-traditional student
- Popular education – Education out of traditional schooling systems, aiming at transforming society
- Remedial education – Assistance in order to achieve competencies in core academic skills
- Vocational education – Studies that prepare a person for a specific occupation
- Scuola serale – Type of adult learning school, in Italy

=== Educators ===
- Paulo Freire – Brazilian educator (1921–1997)
- Malcolm Knowles – American educator (1913–1997)
- Everett Dean Martin – American minister, columnist, and social psychologist (1880–1941)
- Eduard C. Lindeman – American educator (1885–1953)
- Albert Mansbridge – British educator (1876–1952)
- John Dewey – American philosopher, psychologist, and activist (1859–1952)
- Julius Nyerere – President of Tanzania from 1964 to 1985
- Anna J. Cooper
- Lory Schaff – American educator for adult literacy (1932–2012)

=== Historical ===
- Chautauqua
- Lyceum movement – Mid-1800s American adult education movement
- Mechanics' Institutes – Educational establishment
- London Institution – Former British educational institution
- The New School – Private university in New York City

=== Organizations ===
- Association for Talent Development – Non-profitable association
- College Board – US educational nonprofit testing organization, New York, U.S.
- European Association for the Education of Adults (EAEA)
- International Council for Adult Education (ICAE) – International educational organization
- UPCEA (University Professional and Continuing Education Association) – adult and online education non-profit association
- Workers' Educational Association – UK provider of adult education and charity

== Sources ==
- This article incorporates text from a free content work. Licensed under CC BY-SA 3.0 IGO (license statement/permission). Text taken from 3rd global report on adult learning and education: the impact of adult learning and education on health and well-being, employment and the labour market, and social, civic and community life, 19, UNESCO, UNESCO. UNESCO.
- This article incorporates text from a free content work. Licensed under CC BY-SA 3.0 IGO. Text taken from #CommitToEducation, 35, UNESCO, UNESCO. UNESCO.
- This article incorporates text from a free content work. Licensed under CC BY-SA 3.0 IGO. Text taken from Pathways of progression: linking technical and vocational education and training with post-secondary education, UNESCO, UNESCO. UNESCO.
- This article incorporates text from a free content work. Licensed under CC BY-SA 3.0 IGO. Text taken from Reimagining our futures together: a new social contract for education, 188, UNESCO, UNESCO. UNESCO.
