= Architectural endoscopy =

Architectural endoscopy or architectural envisioning is used to photograph and film models of new buildings' exterior and interior in the planning stage. An architectural model of a new building in a 1:500 scale is thus correctly visualized from the perspective of a pedestrian walking by in the street. An endoscope connected to a video camera allows for the creation of walkthroughs, allowing the architect to develop the first draft further, and the public to share and critique the architect's vision of proposed buildings and cities.

== Nomenclature ==
In architecture, the rigid endoscope is called a Relatoskop (German), relatoscop (French), borescope, etc. In this article, 'endoscope' is used as a generic term.

== History ==
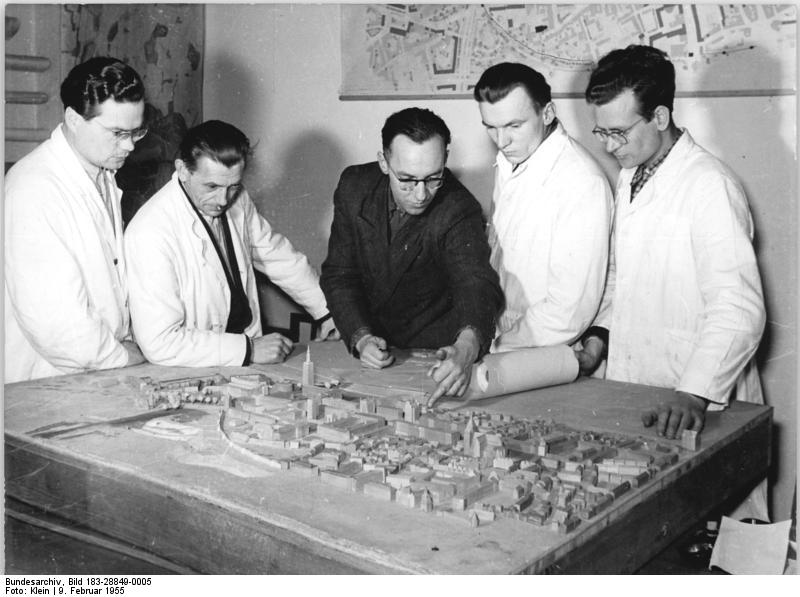
Architects examining a model (urban planning) from a bird's-eye view, Rostock, 1955

The endoscope was invented in 1806 by Philipp Bozzini, in medicine it was used to look inside the human body. In 1954, the Paris-based German architect, Martin Schulz van Treeck (van Treeck), was the first to use endoscopes for visualisation of architectural models. The endoscopes were his father's, Alfred Schulz van Treeck, a physician and pioneer in otoscopy.

He published the first article in the architecture journal Bauen + Wohnen in 1957, titled "Real model photograph as a new representation method in architecture planning" (Reale Modellphotographie als neue Darstellungsmethode in der Architekturplanung).

In architectural design competitions, it is common that a 1:500 scale model of the building is shown in addition to the plans during the presentation. These models are usually seen and photographed from a bird's-eye view. Van Treeck was aware of the problem to mediate architectural design to builders and investors, when seen from the traditional bird's-eye perspective. His idea was to use the endoscope photos as base for drawings of the model and present these to clients or the public, to show what the building would look like if they were walking or driving in the street next to it. He could place the endoscope in a pedestrian's position in the model. Architectural models in 1:500 or 1:100 scale were represented in photos, and later in videos, the way a pedestrian would see the finished building.

The endoscope became known among architects and builders through its use by van Treeck in the planning of the Orgues de Flandre residential buildings on Avenue de Flandre, 19th arrondissement in Paris. The four central residential towers of the settlement have different heights and are designed in the shape of organ pipes. They are called Prelude, Fugue, Cantata and 4, which explains the name Orgues de Flandre ("Church organs of Flanders"). Van Treeck used an endoscope for photography and especially video films, on models in a 1:500 to 1:100 scale in the architectural competition and further planning of the Orgues de Flandre buildings. He documented his work using an endoscope from the beginning.

At the construction and architecture exhibition, Batimat, November 1973 in Paris and Constructa, February 1974 in Hannover, van Treeck and a company introduced the endoscope for the first time on a large scale to members of the international architecture and construction sector. In 1974, van Treeck described the endoscope and its uses for the Orgues de Flandre project, in an article in the German architecture magazine DETAIL. A French article by François Loyer is available online as a PDF, and includes endoscope photos of the Orgues de Flandre project.

== Research ==
In 1974, after the presentation at the trade fairs and the articles in specialist magazines, the use of endoscopes was examined at international universities in the scope of research projects on urban planning. For example, architects and town planners such as urban designer Carl-Axel Acking from Lund, Sweden; Donald Appleyard from Berkeley, California, United States; Hendrik van Leeuwen from Wageningen, Netherlands and Antero Markelin from Stuttgart, Germany; early on explored the use of endoscopes. The focus of their research was the use of video films in urban planning. For experiments, the simulation equipment presented by van Treeck at the fairs was purchased and, because of low funding, "model simulation systems" were built by the institutes for less money. This was done at the Urban Planning Institute of the University of Stuttgart where Antero Markelin taught and researched. The result of his two-year research in Stuttgart in 1975–1977, was published in 1979 in the book Environmental Simulation, sensory simulation in urban development (Umweltsimulation, sensorische Simulation im Städtebau).

At the first conference of the European Architectural Endoscopy Association (EAEA) in 1993 at the Tampere University of Technology in Finland, the Urban Simulator that the Tampere School of Architecture started to build in 1978 was demonstrated. The system as well as the computer control was primarily developed and built by the researchers at the school, because the existing financial resources were very small. Petri Siitonen at the Faculty of Architecture of Helsinki University of Technology, spoke at the conference in his lecture The Future of Endoscopy, about a comparison between the use of computer-aided design (CAD) and endoscope in works made by students. At that time, a study revealed that endoscopy got 27 points and CAD 20 points. He also mentioned that this would change in the years to come.

== European Architectural Endoscopy Association (EAEA) ==
The European Architectural Endoscopy Association (EAEA) was established in 1993. The founding meeting took place at a conference at the Institute of Architecture Technical University of Tampere in Finland. It was the first international conference at which experts from fifteen universities that conducted research and teaching in the field of visualization with endoscopes, presented their results. Similar conferences have been held every second year since then. The ninth conference was organized by the Faculty of Architecture of the Technical University of Cottbus-Senftenberg in 2009. At that conference, the participants agreed to change the name of the EAEA. Instead of endoscopy, the word envisioning would henceforth be used by the association. As of 2015, their name is European Architectural Envisioning Association (EAEA). Thus, the rapid development of computer hardware and software for visualization of construction projects, from single-family homes to urban planning, was included. The Lodz University of Technology (TUL) hosted the 12th EAEA conference in 2015. Plans for conferences in Istanbul, Turkey and Montana in 2016 and in Glasgow, Scotland in 2017, were started in 2015. The EAEA conferences are held each odd-numbered year.

== Practical application ==
In addition to funded research projects at universities, endoscopes have been used by photographers and videographers in studios since 1974, in works for architecture and advertising clients. As special optical instruments, endoscopes became part of the photographic or video equipment in photo studios. For example, in Germany, they were used since 1974 for visual examination of models in Ingo Wende's studio in Berlin, and since 1975 by Alex Kempkens in Munich. Assignments from architects and builders were generally to take pictures of their models with large format cameras and endoscopes. Short films were produced as videos or 16 mm film. The films were generally used on larger urban projects for public relations and public information. As of 2015, only a few photo studios working with endoscope photography still exists.

== Criticism ==
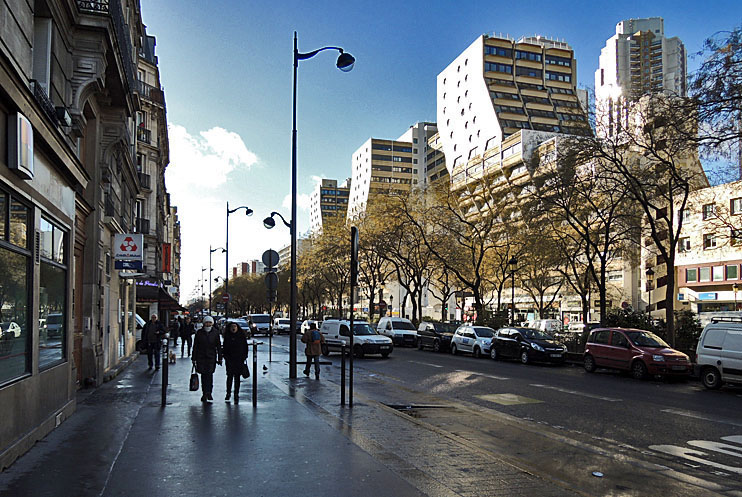
Orgues de Flandre, Paris, by architect Martin Schulz van Treeck, 2016

Van Treeck wrote about the fact that, with an endoscope, a model is photographed from normal eye level.

The sense of Relatoskopie lies in adjusting the view of the observer to the scale of the architecture model, and bring it inside the model at the usual human eye level. ... When comparing reality with simulation through a scale model reality, the credibility of Relatoskopie is proven. The transfer is not illusory, but it brings the essential information regarding the body of the building and its spatial organization forth.

The opponents of controversial construction projects were never convinced, and they criticize the method. Their main critique was that the pictures were photographed from an ant's perspective. The eye level of a 170 cm (5 ft 7 in) person is approximately 160 cm (5 ft 3 in). In a 1:100 scale, the eye level of a pedestrian in a model is at 16 mm (0.63 in) and this level can be precisely maintained with an endoscope, which preferably has a diameter of 8 mm (0.31 in).

== Working with endoscopes ==
To achieve higher quality photographs or films, rigid endoscopes were more suitable because of the quality of the images. An example of this was the rod-lens endoscope invented by Harold Hopkins. The more flexible fiber-optic endoscope, called fiberscope or flexoscope, made from bundled glass fibers do not produce the same quality pictures.

From the start, rigid endoscopes were used for direct viewing, photography, video and film in environmental simulation and for interior and exterior shots of models. Endoscopes used for industrial applications, called borescopes, were basically the same as those used in architecture. Specially developed borescopes were used temporarily in model visualization. Video and film needed strong light and lamps and spotlights with high wattages were required. In professional photo studios, powerful flash units were used. Light emitted from optical fiber systems, which was used in the medicine, was seldom used for architectural models.

The model simulation system presented by van Treek at trade fairs required the endoscope, connected to a video camera or a camera, to be mounted vertically above the model. This was necessary because the viewing angle of the optic was 90 degrees sideways. The system was complex and expensive. When used for photography, endoscopes with different viewing angles could be used, and because of this the camera did not have to be in a vertical position above the model.

== Model visualization before and after 1995 ==
Starting in the early 1960s, research has been done and published on the use of computers in architecture. Until 1995, visualization of a model as a computer image or a computer animation was so complex and expensive that it was rarely an alternative to the less costly endoscope photography or short film. Exceptions were made for prestigious projects, such as in 1984, when a computer model was made of the glass pyramid for the modernization of the Louvre by architect Ieoh Ming Pei.

At move of the Tampere School of Architecture in 1995, the 20 year old "Urban Simulator" was replaced by a modern endoscope system. The latest endoscopes, components and computers were installed for camera control, image processing, and modern computing methods. The new laboratory was presented at the 1997 Conference of EAEA at the Delft University of Technology, Netherlands. As of 2015, endoscope technology for visualization of architectural models is only offered at a few universities in the context of education and research. This is now done parallel with architectural animation 2D, 3D and VR simulation.

The development of technology in computers, lighting, software, wireless data transmission, CCD-Sensors, Videoendoscope and more, was so rapid in the decades following 1995, that an architecture student in the 2010s can barely imagine how laborious model simulation and visualization was earlier. The development of endoscopes also benefited from the new technology during those years. An example of this development is the Urban Simulation Laboratory at the Polytechnic University of Milan, (DIAP), which was founded in 2007. At the EAEA Conference in Milan in 2013, a demonstration was made of a mini car with a micro-camera that could go into a model street, 2.2 cm (0.87 in) wide, to record a video from the eye-level perspective in the car. The images were transmitted directly to a screen. The mini car was moved by hand through the city model. The earlier elaborate technical design for video recording was no longer necessary.

Genuine models that can be touched and examined from all angles, will continue to be built. They will be made for education and to meet clients demands as well as for presentation of projects at international property and investment trade fairs in Europe and worldwide. There are still models that can be viewed from a bird's-eye view in exhibition halls, such as the Expo Real, Munich or the MIPIM in Palais des Festivals et des Congrès, Cannes, France.

== Renaissance of endoscopy ==
At the EAEA Conference 1993 in Tampere Bob Martens said: "A renaissance of endoscopy could thus be envisaged at least for still pictures". He also worked with 3D computer simulation but said that endoscopy continues to have advantages in the training of students: "Endoscopy is not overloaded with theory; Students can tackle the subject in a playful manner ". He could not foresee the technical development plus the cost reduction in the decades following his presentation. In the summer of 2015, two of the largest retail chains in Germany sold videoscope cameras for €60 as "men's toys". At the present, it is even possible for students to create their own video with endoscopes to visualize their models for a presentation at the end of the semester. Rigid endoscopes and related photographic equipment have also become affordable. The reduction of costs for the use of endoscopes supports the thesis of Bob Martens, that it may 'come to a' 'Renaissance of endoscopy'.

== Reception ==
Martin Schulz van Treeck's idea in 1954, was about the eye-level perspective of the pedestrian and the need to convey the concept of the design to clients and the citizens. At the time, an endoscope was the only tool available to photograph and film architectural models from this perspective. The digital revolution was in its infancy and had not yet developed tools (hardware and software) sufficiently to realize his idea. Since then, decades have passed and with computers the eye-level perspective of a pedestrian can be visualized as a photo or a movie without difficulty. The endoscope of yesteryear has been supplemented in the digital age by new technologies, establishing van Treek's idea to present designs from the perspective of pedestrians.

== See also ==
- Architectural design values
- Architectural model
- Bigatures
- Urban planning
