= Eduard C. Lindeman =

American educator (1885–1953)

- Born: Eduard Christian Lindeman; May 9, 1885; St. Clair, Michigan, U.S.
- Died: April 13, 1953 (aged 67)
- Education: Michigan State College
- Occupation: Educator
- Known for: Pioneering contributions in adult education
- Parent(s): Frederick Lindeman; Frederika von Piper

Eduard Christian Lindeman (May 9, 1885 – April 13, 1953) was an American educator, notable for his pioneering contributions in adult education. He introduced many concepts of modern adult education in his book, The Meaning of Adult Education.

== Background ==
Eduard Christian Lindeman was born in St. Clair, Michigan, one of ten children of German immigrant parents, Frederick and Frederika (von Piper) Lindemann. Orphaned at an early age, Lindeman gained work experience through jobs as stable cleaner, nurseryman, gravedigger, brickyard worker, and deliverer of groceries while attending formal schooling only intermittently. At age 22, he gained admittance to Michigan State College with academic skills well below average in the areas of reading and writing abilities. Despite this, as an undergraduate he authored essays, poetry, editorials, and a four-act play. Lindeman also wrote one of the first books on community development, was an early explorer of group work, and worked to extend popular education. He was a pioneer on many interlocking fronts- a pioneer social scientist with an allegiance to both science and to society and its processes and also a pioneer in adult education and social philosophy.

== Professional career ==
Following college, Lindeman worked as an educator in a variety of settings with young people and adults including the Chicago YMCA and 4-H clubs, served on various commissions, filled the capacity of advisory editor, and was Chair of the American Civil Liberties Union Commission of Academic Freedom. He began on a 'sub-freshman' program (what we now call an "access course" and then joined the main program. His work transcended traditional subject borders and disciplines, labeling Lindeman as primarily a social worker turned philosopher. Soon after joining the New York School of Social Work in 1926, he published his major work on adult education, The Meaning of Adult Education. Between this accomplishment and his retirement in 1950, Lindeman published approximately 204 articles, 107 book reviews, five books, 16 monographs, and 17 chapters in other works. He edited four books, shared joint authorship of another, and gave at least 44 lectures of which some written record remains.

Among other things, in 1938 Lindeman was inducted as an Associate Fellow in the National Academy of Kinesiology (formerly American Academy of Physical Education; American Academy of Kinesiology and Physical Education).

== Educational philosophy ==
Lindeman drew much of his intellectual constructs from three principal sources: educational philosopher John Dewey; Danish philosopher/educator/theologian N. F. S. Grundtvig; and writer/philosopher Ralph Waldo Emerson. He admired the Danish Folk High School non-curricular education system initiated by Grundtvig so much that he would occasionally pass himself off as a child of Danish immigrants, though his parents were both German, and though he neither spoke nor read any Danish (https://www.youtube.com/watch?v=15yme8VbjwM). Being a friend and colleague of John Dewey, Lindeman shared with him a concern for social justice, a belief in the possibilities of education and human action, and a deep commitment to democracy. His key assumptions about adult learners were:

- Adults are motivated to learn as they experience needs and interests that learning will satisfy.
- Adults’ orientation to learning is life-centered.
- Experience is the richest source for adult’s learning.
- Adults have a deep need to be self-directing.
- Individual differences among people increase with age.

Lindeman’s vision for education was not bound by classrooms and formal curricula. It involved a concern for the educational possibilities of everyday life; non-vocational ideals; situations not subjects; and people’s experience. He viewed education as life. The whole of life is learning, therefore education can have no ending. Lindeman felt our academic system to be in reverse order with subjects and teachers constituting the starting point and students secondary. In conventional education the student is required to adjust to an established curriculum; in adult education the curriculum is built around the students’ needs and interests. He believed:

- Education should be coterminous with life
- It should revolve around non-academic and non-vocational ideas
- It should start with the lives of the learners
- It should look to the learner's own experience as its most valuable resource

It is interesting to note that Lindeman did not dichotomize adult versus youth education, but rather adult versus "conventional" education. The implication is that youths might learn better, too, when their needs and interests, life situations, experiences, self concepts, and individual differences are taken into account. Lindeman further expressed his views by writing, "None but the humble become good teachers of adults. In an adult class the student’s experience counts for as much as the teacher’s knowledge...sometimes it is difficult to discover who is learning most, the teacher or the students."

At a testimonial dinner in 1953, the last year of Lindeman’s life, Malcolm Knowles’ tribute letter addressed Lindeman as the one elder statesman in the field to whom the younger organizers of the new Adult Education Association have consistently and confidently turned for inspiration, moral support, and wise guidance.

He was influenced by Mary Follet- "Power with, rather than power over." It creates new possibilities from the very differences that might exist in a group. Unlike brute force, 'power with' energizes organically from the participants involved and grow stronger the more it is put to use. Follet saw development as a creative experience within the individual and whole accomplished through "relating which involves an increment that can be measured only by compound interest".

Ralph Waldo Emerson connects to Lindeman via the publication of "essays: Second Series 1844". This series indicates the "moral domain, and arguably more profound change that already taken place in Emersons conception of humanity as "participant" in nature."

Lindeman and "True component group" & The Multiplier Effect: The multiplier effect refers to the increase in final income arising from any new injection of spending. The expansion of a countries money supply that results from banks being able to lend. True component group is the family and all other forms of human organization must be considered as being constituent, in as much as we are not born into them but must in some manner join them voluntarily. Lindeman produced early, pioneering, texts on community and community organization (1921), and on working with groups (1924). He wrote "The Meaning of Adult Education" a book widely regarded as America's andragogical bible. Gruntvig is never quoted, in fact, although Lindeman provided citations of many scholars, such as Dewey, Santaxana, and Whitehead.

Lindeman possessed a 'consistent determination never to separate human problems from philosophical consideration' and demanded that the profession should not separate them.

== Quotes ==
'"...the approach to adult education will be via the route of situations, not subjects."

"in Danish life...one finds an educational ferment such as motivates no other people in the modern world. Since the days of Grundvig...Danish adults have striven to close the yawning abyss between life and enlightenment [by laying] the foundations for a system of education which continues so long as life lasts. Adult education, one begins to learn after prolonged observation, has not merely changed citizens from illiteracy to literacy; it has rebuilt the total structure of life's values."

(Lindeman 1926/1961, "The Meaning of Adult Education")

Adult education is a co-operative venture in non-authoritarian, informal learning the chief purpose of which is to discover the meaning of experience; a quest of the mind which digs down to the roots of the preconceptions which formulate our conduct; a technique of learning for adults which makes education coterminous with life, and hence elevates living itself to the level of an experiment.

What is Adult Education? (1925) p. 3

Adult education will become an agency of progress if its short-term goal of self-improvement can be made compatible with a long-term, experimental but resolute policy of changing the social order.

The Meaning of Adult Education (1926)

Small groups of aspiring adults who desire to keep their minds fresh and vigorous; who begin to learn by confronting pertinent situations; who dig down into the reservoirs of their secondary facts; who are led in the discussion by teachers who are also seekers after wisdom and not oracles: this constitutes the setting for adult education the modern quest for life’s meaning.

The Meaning of Adult Education (1926)

Every social action group should at the same time be an adult education group, and I go even as far as to believe that all successful adult education groups sooner or later become social action groups.

The Sociology of Adult Education (1945)

== Books ==
- Social Discovery: an approach to the study of functional groups. (1924)
- The Meaning of Adult Education. (1926)
