= Owenea River =

River in County Donegal, Ireland

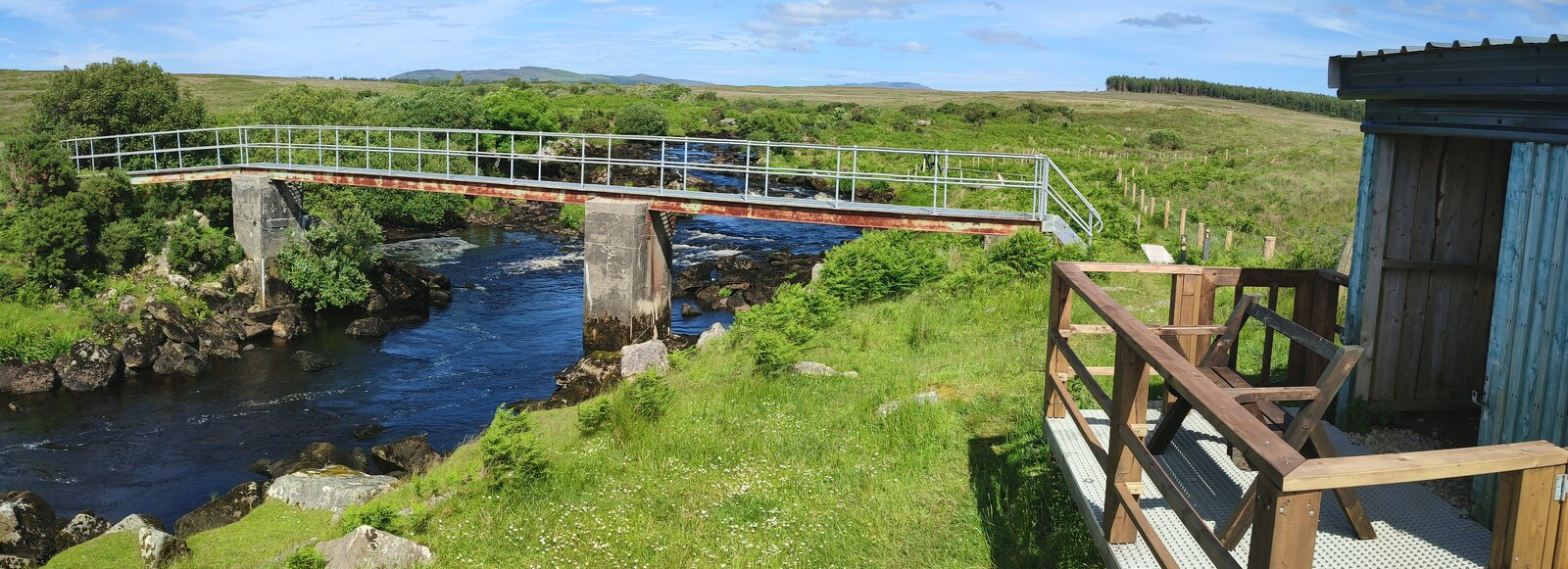
- Footbridge over the Owenea River near Ardara

- Location in Ireland
- Native name: Abhainn Fhia (Irish)

Location
- Jurisdictions: Ireland
- Province: Ulster
- Counties: County Donegal
- Towns: Glenties

Physical characteristics
- Source: Lough Ea
  - coordinates: 54.8053°N 8.1322°W
- Mouth: Loughrosmore Bay
  - coordinates: 54.775°N 8.411°W
- Length: 21 km (13 mi)
- Basin size: 126 km^{2} (49 mi^{2})

The Owenea River (Irish: Abhainn Fhia) is a river in County Donegal, Ireland. It drains Lough Ea in the Blue Stack Mountains, flowing through the village of Glenties before entering Loughrosmore Bay north of Ardara. The length of the Owenea River is 21 km (13 mi).

The Ownea River Trail is a hiking trail of 7.3 mi (11.7 km) along the river.

== Natural history ==
The Owenea River is a popular angling river, with fish such as grilse, spring salmon, sea trout and brown trout. Sea trout numbers in the river have recovered somewhat following a large drop in the 1980s.

Two Special Areas of Conservation (SACs) are within the Owenea River catchment: West of Ardara/Maas Road SAC and Lough Nillan Bog (Carrickatlieve) SAC.
