= DETAIL (professional journal) =

DETAIL is the international professional journal for architecture and construction details produced by Detail publishers. Each issue deals with a specific aspect of building, such as concrete construction, roof structures or refurbishment, whereby emphasis is placed on the quality of the building details. Up-to-date examples are selected from schemes around the world, and these are illustrated with plans and details drawn to a consistent scale as well as with photographs. The journal focuses on the depiction of new developments in the form of descriptive texts, constructional drawings and photos. The target group comprises above all architects, engineers and other specialists from the field of construction.

DETAIL is owned by EPP Professional Publishing, who acquired it from Reed Business Information in 2010.

== History ==
DETAIL was first published in 1961. In 2008, in its 48th year, ten issues of the journal are published per annum. From 2009, the number increased to 12 a year.

== Brief description ==
DETAIL is an international professional journal for architects, construction engineers, building authorities and developers. Its title highlights a central feature of the content, which consists of the documentation and description of building developments of all kinds. Emphasis is placed on the depiction of constructional and architectural relationships. DETAIL comprises five main sections under the headings Discussion, Reports, Documentation, Technology and Products. It thus represents an important source of information for architects and planning offices. Two special DETAIL Concept issues highlight not only the ideas underlying the design of outstanding buildings, but the entire planning and construction process.

== Content ==
The journal contains commentaries and topical articles, professional discussions and special reports, as well as documentations of specific buildings, in which spatial and urban relationships are described in the form of photos, drawings and explanatory texts, details of the technology involved, and product information relating to the construction, fitting out and furnishing of the buildings. In many cases, the product information is complemented by illustrations as well. There are also reports on various events, on building and planning law and building physics. Each issue of the journal concentrates on a specific aspect of construction, illustrating this with up-to-date examples from around the world. The selected projects show the range of the topic under discussion. Together with the Documentation section, the projects form the central part of each issue. The opening Discussion section, which contains interviews, critical statements and historical analyses, serves as an introduction to the main theme of each issue. The subsequent technical considerations with specialist contributions serve to intensify the treatment of the subject. The journal ends with a product information section.

== Publication ==
DETAIL is published ten times a year (from 2009 there will be 12 issues per annum) and is distributed to 80 countries in a bilingual (German-English) edition. In addition to this international edition, the journal appears six times a year in a purely English version. Copies sent abroad contain an inserted brochure with translations of the most important articles into French, Russian and Italian. Since 2002, an exclusively Spanish edition of the journal has been published in Spain with a full translation of the contents. Dates of publication: each issue appears in the first week of a month. Advertising planning deadline: six weeks prior to date of publication Deadline for receipt of material: five weeks prior to date of publication

== Circulation ==
The print run for the German-language edition is 38,844 copies. The average circulation over the year is 33,076 copies (IVW 3/06–2/07); English edition: 12,000 copies; Spanish edition: 10,000 copies; Chinese/English edition: 6,000 copies; Japanese edition: 10,000 copies (publisher's information 1/07).

== Readership ==
The readership includes architectural practices, joint architectural and engineering offices, construction-planning departments in industry, banks, etc., planning departments of public building offices, construction and housing development organizations, building firms, mechanical-service engineers and structural engineers.

== DETAIL internationally ==
The journal is read in more than 80 countries and is published in three different languages:

- DETAIL in a bilingual (German-English) edition with an online translation supplement in French and Italian; 10 issues a year (2008)
- DETAIL in English (the entire journal translated into English; 6 issues a year)
- DETAIL in Chinese (6 issues a year)

== DETAIL Network ==
The DETAIL journal forms part of Detail Network, which includes Detail X, Detail360.de, Detail360.com, Deutscher Baukatalog (DBK), DETAIL (the journal) and Detail Online. The network functions as a community, databank, reference tool and marketplace for specialist information in the field of architecture and building construction.

DETAIL.de: Architects and building engineers can find topical everyday reports on architecture and details of current events as well as information on building law, building physics and construction materials in this DETAIL gateway to architecture. The archive contains articles published in past issues of the journal which can be downloaded. Every Monday, the job-service facility contains new offers of employment from the European building sector. These can also be obtained – sorted according to professional groups – by means of a Newsletter subscription. In addition, DETAIL Topics and DETAIL Plus provide two platforms free of charge with specialist information on matters related to planning and other professional fields.

DETAIL X : DETAIL X is a free internet gateway run by students of architecture for students of architecture. Here, access to expert knowledge is provided in a compact form for students of the various building disciplines. This facility also serves as a platform for a mutual exchange of ideas and for the presentation of students’ projects and special interests. The editorial contents are taken from the architectural journal DETAIL and are also contributed by the users themselves. In this way, an extensive databank is built up, containing much basic information, university papers and specialist knowledge from DETAIL. The forum, together with the integrated weblog, stimulates interactive communication and the exchange of information. University profiles and rankings provide an overview of the schools of architecture in German-speaking countries.

DETAIL 360°: DETAIL360.com provides scope for architects, specialist planners, interior designers and consultants to present their offices and projects in a visual form and to describe them in their own words. The professional community is a platform for making new contacts or deepening relationships with existing partners and clients. In May 2008, DETAIL360.com was established on an international basis. Offices can now present themselves and their projects across borders and find partners on a global scale.

Deutscher Baukatalog (German Building Catalogue): The DETAIL Deutscher Baukatalog (DBK) is a cost-free research tool for product information in the realm of architecture and building construction. Here, architects can find the products of more than 45,000 manufacturers in Germany, Austria and Switzerland. In this way, one has an overview of all building products available in these countries, as well as concise descriptions of and contact data to the relevant companies in this market. An intelligent search facility allows simple access to the relevant planning data. The products and services on offer are accessible via more than 2,000 specific keywords. Forming part of the DETAIL network, the Deutscher Baukatalog provides a databank to aid architects in choosing the most suitable products for their own projects.
