= City of Hialeah Educational Academy =

Public charter school in Hialeah, Florida

Coordinates: 25.891369°N 80.335842°W

City of Hialeah Education Academy

Location
- 2590 West 76 St; Hialeah, Florida; United States

Information
- Type: Public charter school
- Motto: Honor, Loyalty, Respect
- Established: August 18, 2008
- School district: Miami-Dade County Public Schools
- NCES School ID: 120039007454
- Principal: Graciela Carbajosa
- Grades: 6–12
- Enrollment: 975 (2023–24)
- Campus type: Suburban
- Colors: Blue, grey, red, white
- Mascot: Bulldog
- Website: www.coheaedu.com

The City of Hialeah Educational Academy, also known as COHEA Career and Collegiate Academy, is a public charter school in Hialeah, Florida.

The school serves middle and high school students from 6th to 12th grade. The curriculum is designed with college prep in mind and has a STEM influence, although emphasizes emergency response, health, and law enforcement career paths. The school is located on a college-style campus.
