= Journalism (journal) =

- Discipline: Media Studies
- Language: English
- Edited by: Howard Tumber and Barbie Zelizer

Publication details
- History: 2000-present
- Publisher: SAGE Publications (United Kingdom)
- Frequency: Monthly

Standard abbreviations
- ISO 4: Journalism

Indexing
- ISSN: 1464-8849 (print); 1741-3001 (web)
- LCCN: 2001238121
- OCLC no.: 169874699

Links
- Journal homepage; Online access; Online archive

Journalism is a peer-reviewed academic journal that publishes papers twelve times a year in the field of journalism. The journal's editors are Howard Tumber (City, University of London) and Barbie Zelizer (University of Pennsylvania). It has been in publication since 2000 and is currently published by SAGE Publications. Journalism is also affiliated to the Journalism Studies Interest Group of the International Communication Association.

== Scope ==
Journalism publishes theoretical and empirical articles which contribute to the social, political and practical understanding of journalism. The interdisciplinary journal provides a forum for articles, research and findings from academic researchers and critical practitioners with an interest in journalism.

== Abstracting and indexing ==
Journalism is abstracted and indexed in the following databases:

- Academic Index
- ComIndex
- MLA International Bibliography
- SCOPUS
- Social Sciences Citation Index (Impact factor pending)
