= European Evangelical Alliance =

European section of World Evangelical Alliance

- Classification: Protestant
- Orientation: Interdenominational Evangelical
- Leader: Connie Duarte and Jan Wessels
- Distinct fellowships: World Evangelical Alliance
- Region: Europe
- Headquarters: Bonn, Germany; Brussels, Belgium
- Origin: 1952
- Members: 23 million
- Official website: europeanea.org

European Evangelical Alliance (EEA) is an interdenominational organization of evangelical Christian churches in Europe. It is the European section of the World Evangelical Alliance and is based in Zürich and Bonn.

The EEA has existed as a regional group since the 1950s, but traces its roots to the 1846 conference at which the World Evangelical Alliance (WEA) was established. It represents 23 million evangelical Christians across Europe and is one of the four main regional church bodies in Europe. It also has an office in Brussels and is part of the European Parliament Intergroup on Freedom of Religion or Belief and Religious Tolerance

The Co-Secretary General of the EEA are Connie Duante and Jan Wessels since October 2022. In 2022, the EEA signalled its opposition to antisemitism with its adoption of the IHRA working definition.

== See also ==
- World Evangelical Alliance
- Lausanne Movement
