= Ecumenical Advocacy Alliance =

Ecumenical Advocacy Alliance

Ecumenical Advocacy Alliance is an international network of over 90 churches and Christian organizations cooperating in advocacy on global trade and on HIV and AIDS. Working with these groups, the alliance strives to better inform policies and practices of governments, international institutions, corporations, and local communities.
