= EA (disambiguation) =

EA is an initialism for Electronic Arts, an American video game company.

EA, E.A., Ea, or ea may also refer to:

== Arts and media ==
- Eä, the World that Is of J. R. R. Tolkien's Middle-earth universe
- Ea, fictional world of EA Cycle by David Zindell
- "EA", a 2017 song by Young Nudy and 21 Savage from the mixtape Slimeball 2
- "Ea, Lord of the Depths", a 1992 song by Burzum from its self-titled debut studio album

== Business ==
- Enrolled agent, a federally authorized tax practitioner in the United States
- Enrolled actuary, a federally licensed actuary in the United States
- Enterprise architecture, a framework to analyse an enterprise
- Euro Area or Eurozone, a monetary union in Europe
- Executive assistant

== Businesses and organisations ==
=== Airlines ===
- Ándalus Líneas Aéreas (IATA code 2008-2010)
- Eastern Air Lines (IATA code 1925-1991)
- European Air Express (IATA code 1999-2007)

=== Education ===
- City of Hialeah Educational Academy, a school in Hialeah, Florida
- Edinburgh Academy, a school in Edinburgh, Scotland
- Episcopal Academy, a school in Newtown, Pennsylvania
- Education Authority

=== Other businesses and organizations ===
- Electricity Association, a former association of electricity companies in the United Kingdom
- Emotions Anonymous, a program for those seeking to improve their mental or emotional health
- Engine Alliance, a joint venture between General Electric and Pratt & Whitney
- Engineers Australia, a professional body
- Enterprise Architect (software), a visual modeling and design tool based on the OMG UML
- Environment Agency, a regulatory body for the environment in England, part of the Department for Environment, Food and Rural Affairs
- European Athletic Association, commonly known as European Athletics
- Eusko Alkartasuna, a Basque political party
- National Solidarity (Greece) or Ethniki Allilengyi, a Greek World War II-era welfare organization

== Places ==
- Ea, Spain, a town in the Basque province of Biscay, Spain
- Eko Atlantic, a city in Lagos State, Nigeria
- Ceuta and Melilla, Spanish sovereign territories (ISO 3166-1 alpha-2 Exceptionally Reserved code EA)
- East Asia
- Lough Ea, County Donegal, Ireland, a small lake

== Religion ==
- Ea (Babylonian god) or Enki, a water deity
- Ecumenical Accompanier, a participant in the Ecumenical Accompaniment Programme in Palestine and Israel
- Evangelical Alliance, a UK group of Evangelical Christians

== Science and technology ==
=== Units ===
- Exaampere (EA), an SI unit of electric current
- Activation energy (E_{a}), in chemistry
- Exa-annum (Ea), a unit of time

=== Other uses in science and technology ===
- Material Testing Program EA (Edgewood Arsenal) numbers
- Electron affinity
- Ethyl acetate
- Electrophilic addition, a type of reaction in organic chemistry
- EMC EA/EB diesel locomotive, a cab-equipped lead unit
- Eosin Azure, a polychrome cytoplasmic stain used in the Papanicolaou stain
- Evolutionary algorithm, an optimization algorithm
- Extended Attribute, a computer file system feature

== Other uses ==
- Ea Ea, also known as Craige Schensted, mathematician and game designer
- EA Guzman (born 1989), Filipino actor, singer, comedian, host, and model
- Early action, a form of college admission in the United States
- Effective altruism, a social movement and philosophy for determining the most effective ways to benefit others
- Engineering Aide, a Seabee occupational rating in the U.S. Navy
- Environmental assessment, a legislative decision-making process
- Episodic ataxia, an incoordination disorder
- EA, a designation for the El-Amarna letters, ancient Egyptian correspondence
- ea, a digraph in the list of Latin-script digraphs
- Sumbawa (vehicle registration prefix EA)

== See also ==
- AE (disambiguation)
- EAEA (disambiguation)
