= Lough Ea =

Lake in County Donegal, Ireland

- Loch Aodha
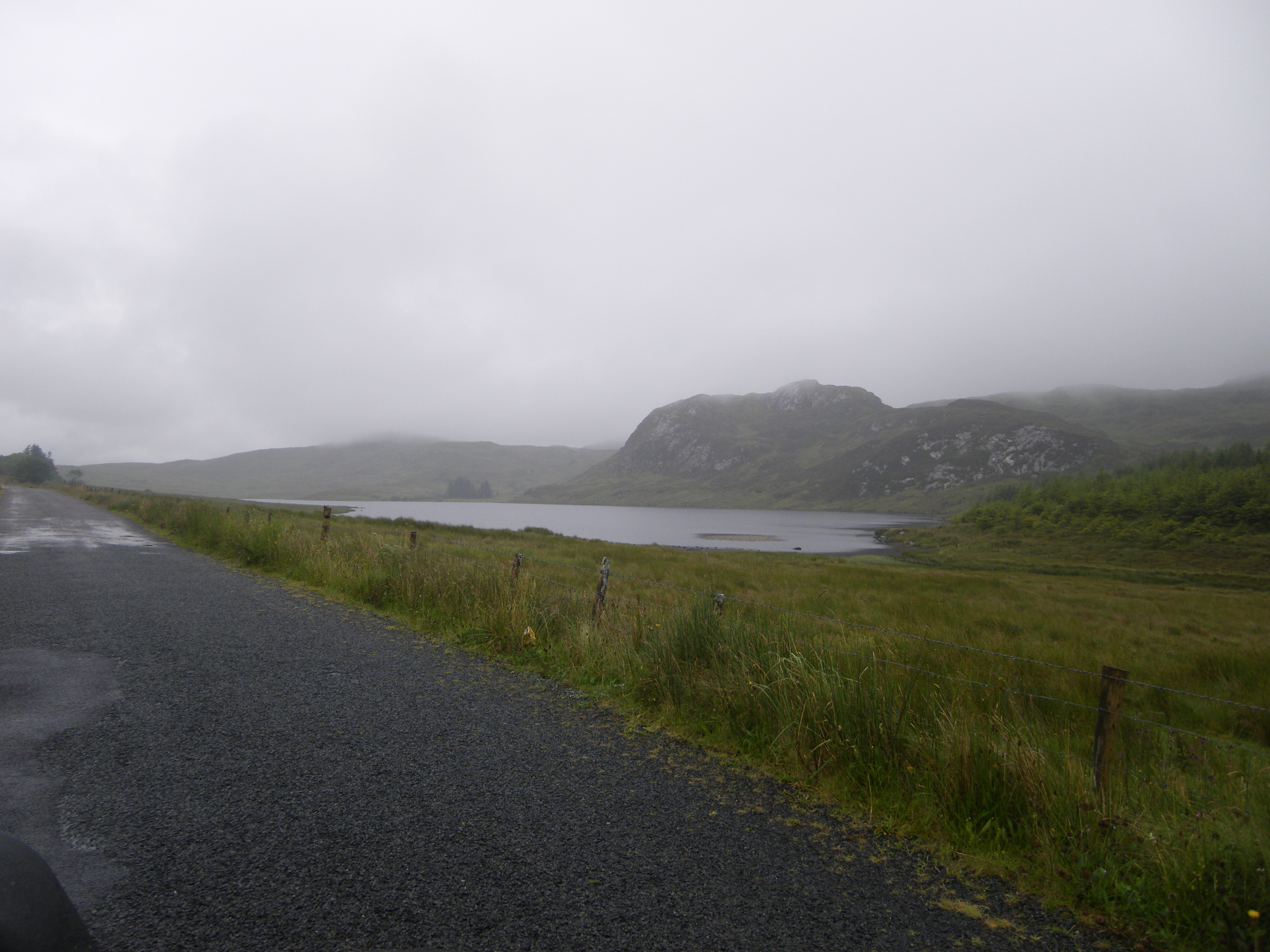

- Location within island of Ireland
- Location: County Donegal
- Coordinates: 54°48′19″N 8°07′56″W
- Type: lake
- Primary outflows: Owenea River
- Basin countries: Ireland

Lough Ea (Irish: Loch Aodha) is a lake located east of the town of Glenties, near the R253 road, in County Donegal, Ireland. The lake is the source of the Owenea River which meets the Atlantic Ocean 26 kilometres (16 mi) to the west.
