= Aea (mythology) =

Huntress of Colchis in Greek mythology

In Greek mythology, Aea (Ancient Greek: Αἶα, romanized: Aîa) was a huntress of Colchis, who attracted the unwanted attention of a local river-god.

== Mythology ==
Aea fell victim to the pursuit of Phasis, a river god, who desired her. She shot her arrows at him and ran away from him, but eventually the chase wore her down. Phasis caught her and bound her on the waves. She was metamorphosed by the gods into the island bearing the same name, in order to rescue her from the pursuit of Phasis. Her story was depicted on the palace walls of Aeëtes, the king of Colchis.

== See also ==
- Asteria
- Perimele
