= Foam Index =

Foam Index test is a rapid method to determine the relative levels of Air Entraining Agent (AEA) needed during concrete mixing, with or without mineral additives like combustion fly ash, that control air void volumes within cured concrete.

== Introduction ==
AEA surfactants are added into concrete mixes to impart stable air microbubbles to give air void volumes between ~ 5%–10%. Besides increasing workability, adding the correct amount of AEA during concrete mixing improves its resistance to cracking during freeze and thaw cycles. Adding too much AEA during mixing decreases concrete strengths.

Fly ash from pulverized coal combustion is a typical mineral admixture utilized in the production of concrete, where it partially replaces cement and improves concrete workability, pumping characteristics, hardness and resistance to alkali attack. However, cement and components of fly ash adsorb AEA’s to different extents, making it more difficult to routinely impart the correct amount of entrained air into concrete. The Foam Index Test was developed to measure capacities of AEA for cement-mineral admixtures during concrete mixing.

The Foam Index Test is a laboratory titration procedure which determines the AEA absorption on fly ash or fly ash and cement mixtures. An AEA is titrated into a fly ash and cement suspension and the suspension is shaken. The added AEA leads to foam formation on top of the liquid surface, which initially behaves in an unstable manner. At the endpoint of the test, the AEA absorption sites are “saturated” and the AEA contributes to foam formation on the top of the mixture. The amount of AEA required to obtain stable foam depends on fly ash quality, fly ash-cement interactions, and characteristics of the AEA. Some fly ashes, typically those with high unburned carbon contents, tend to adsorb high amounts of AEA, i.e. more AEA is needed to obtain stable foam.

== Procedure of foam index test ==
Adding diluted AEA one drop at a time is the most accurate way to measure the foam index, especially when trying to develop your ability to duplicate the test. You may want to add five drops at a time at first with a high dosage rate material until you get near the “Index” level. The traditional way to identify foam index values is by visual observation.

• A “Stable Foam” is achieved when no open areas of liquid show for at least 30–45 seconds on the surface of the foam. Bubbles break rapidly at AEA levels below the “Index” level. Bubbles will still break for several increments above the “Index” level as well … don’t continue adding AEA trying to stop the breaking bubbles. This point is difficult to judge at first. Run the same material several times in a row to help calibrate your “eye.”

• Although the Foam Index test is not designed to determine the actual AEA dosage amounts needed for concrete, it is possible to standardize procedures to determine AEA dosage amounts. It is also a good test to determine if specific materials will require more or less AEA relative to others. If the test is performed on the same materials and a plot of the results charted against required AEA dosages, correlations are possible between AEA dosage requirements and Foam Index test results.

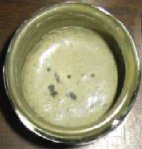
Bubbles do not cover entire surface

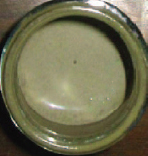
Bubbles cover entire surface

== Automated Foam Index Test (AFIT) ==
The AFIT instrument quantifies the dynamic foaming properties of air entraining agents, surfactants and foaming materials. It makes these measurements without intrusion of a probe or device into a working environment. Appropriate foam stabilities are necessary for proper performance of the materials onto/into which AEA’s or surfactants are applied. Stable foams have stable bubbles; unstable foams have breaking bubbles. When bubbles break they produce unique acoustic signatures, the dynamic properties of which are measured by the detectors incorporated into the AFIT instrument. The outcome is quantitative, repeatable foam index values and foaming measurements.
