= Aea (Malis) =

Town in Malis, ancient Thessaly

Aea or Aia (Ancient Greek: Αἶα) or Aeaea or Aiaia (Αἰαία) was a town in Malis in ancient Thessaly. It was mentioned by Sophocles. It was presumably a harbour town, and its site has not been located.
