= Aromai Airport =

Airport in Siwo, Emae, Vanuatu

- IATA: EAE; ICAO: NVSE

Summary
- Airport type: Public
- Serves: Siwo, Emae, Vanuatu
- Elevation AMSL: 7 ft / 2 m
- Coordinates: 17°05′25″S 168°20′34″E

Map
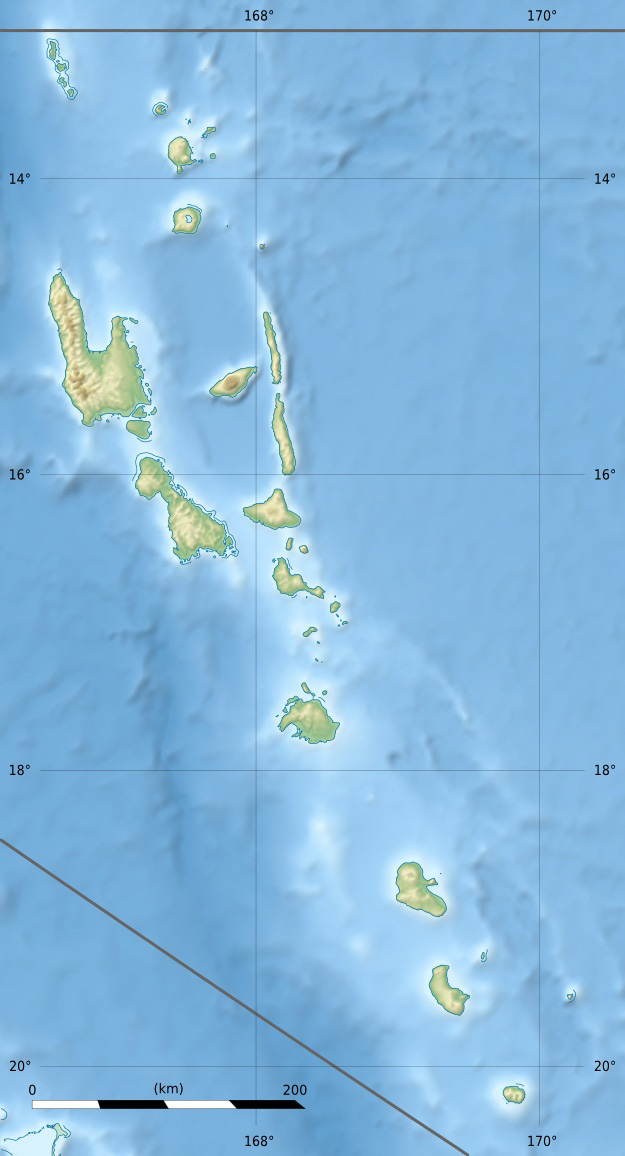
- Location of airport in Vanuatu

Runways
Direction	Length		Surface
Direction	m	ft	Surface
	1,000	3,281

Aromai Airport is an airport in Siwo on Emae Island in Vanuatu (IATA: EAE, ICAO: NVSE).

A departure tax is charged for departures from this airport.
