= Priya Kurian =

New Zealand political science academic

Priya Anna Kurian
- Education: Purdue University
- Scientific career
- Fields: Political science
- Workplaces: University of Waikato
- Thesis: Gender and environmental policy: A feminist evaluation of environmental impact assessment and the World Bank. (1995)
- Doctoral students: Verica Rupar

Priya Anna Kurian is a New Zealand political science academic. She is currently a full professor at the University of Waikato.

== Academic career ==
After several years working as a reporter in India, Kurian completed a 1995 PhD titled 'Gender and environmental policy: A feminist evaluation of environmental impact assessment and the World Bank.' at the Purdue University, they then moved to the University of Waikato, rising to full professor.

Kurian is married to fellow Waikato professor Debashish Munshi. Notable students include professor of journalism Verica Rupar.

== Selected works ==
- Bartlett, Robert V., and Priya A. Kurian. "The theory of environmental impact assessment: implicit models of policy making." Policy & Politics 27, no. 4 (1999): 415–433.
- Bhavnani, Kum-Kum, John Foran, and Priya A. Kurian. "An introduction to women culture and development." (2003): 1-21.
- Kurian, Priya A. Engendering the environment? Gender in the World Bank's environmental policies. Routledge, 2018.
- Bhavnani, Kum-Kum, John Foran, and Priya A. Kurian. "Introduction: from the edges of development." In On the Edges of Development, pp. 15–24. Routledge, 2009.
- Bartlett, Robert V., Priya A. Kurian, and Madhu Malik, eds. International Organizations and Environmental Policy. No. 355. Greenwood Publishing Group, 1995.
