= Political Science (journal) =

- Discipline: Political science
- Language: English
- Edited by: David Capie, Jana von Stein and Jack Vowles

Publication details
- History: 1948–present
- Publisher: Taylor and Francis
- Frequency: Triannual
- Impact factor: 1.2 (2024)

Standard abbreviations
- ISO 4: Political Sci.

Indexing
- ISSN: 0032-3187 (print); 2041-0611 (web)
- LCCN: 54036318
- OCLC no.: 7342321

Links
- Journal homepage

Political Science is a peer-reviewed academic journal covering political science. It was established at Victoria University of Wellington in 1948 and remains New Zealand's sole professional journal of political science. It is published by Taylor and Francis and has a broadly comparative or international approach, with a particular focus on the Asia-Pacific region.

== Abstracting and indexing ==
The journal is abstracted and indexed in Current Contents, International Bibliography of the Social Sciences, and the Social Sciences Citation Index. According to the Journal Citation Reports, its 2024 impact factor is 1.2, ranking it 75th out of 156 journals in the category "Political Science".
