= Egypt Aviation Academy =

Aviation training organisation

Coordinates: 29.813266°N 30.834494°E

Egyptian Aviation Academy الأكاديمية المصرية لعلوم الطيران
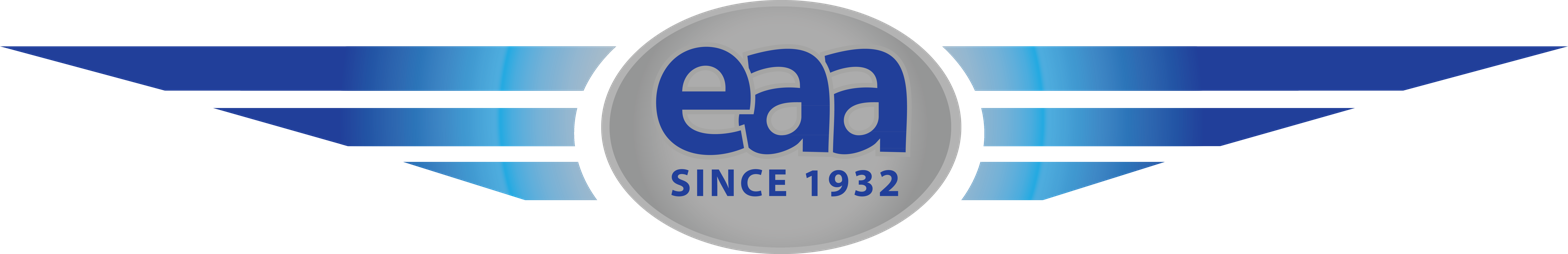
- Established: 1932
- Focus: Aviation
- Formerly called: Misr Flying Institute
- Location: 6th of October City, Egypt
- Website: Official website

Egyptian Aviation Academy (EAA) is an aviation training organisation that offers aviation programs for pilot, air traffic control, engineering and information technology training.

== History ==
Misr Flying Institute was established on 7 May 1932 under the name Misr Flying School by a Royal Decree that established the Misr Air Company, which later changed its name to EgyptAir. It was the duty of the new school to prepare pilots to fly Egypt Air aircraft and was based at Almaza airport (HEAZ). The high demand for this school encouraged Egypt Air to open a new school in Alexandria in July 1933.

On 22 November 1971 President of Egypt, Anwar Sadat, issued a republican decree for the establishment of the National Civil Aviation Training Organization (NCATO) and Misr Flying Institute was subordinated from Egypt Air to NCATO. It is considered the first regional institute for training pilots in the field of Civil Aviation, not only in Egypt but in the Middle East.

The EAA has become a leading organisation in the field of regional and international Civil Aviation Training, providing its graduates an Egypt High Education Ministry recognised certificate.

== Educational schools ==
Egyptian Aviation Academy includes:

- Misr Flying College
- Air Traffic Control College
- Aviation Engineering College
