= European Association for the Education of Adults =

- Formation: 1953
- Type: Non-Governmental Organisation, Non-Profit Organisation
- Purpose: Policy advocacy for lifelong learning at European level; promoting non-formal adult education; facilitating co–operation and impact of NGOs in lifelong learning and adult education at European level
- Headquarters: Brussels, Belgium
- Key people: Per Paludan Hansen, President, elected in 2013 for a 2 year term Gina Ebner, Secretary General, since 2007
- Website: www.eaea.org

The European Association for the Education of Adults (EAEA) is a European NGO whose purpose is to link and represent European organisations directly involved in adult learning. The main focus is to promote adult learning and access to and participation in non-formal adult education for all, particularly for groups currently under-represented. EAEA aims at influencing EU policies on non-formal adult education and lifelong learning and cooperates with the institutions of the European Union and with international organisations as the Council of Europe, the International Council for Adult Education (ICAE) and UNESCO.

== History ==
Previously known as the European Bureau for Adult Education, EAEA has its roots in the Folk high schools in Europe, and in particular in those of the Netherlands. In the first years after the Second World War, the Netherlands Folk high school movement saw it as its mission to strive for a Europe wide cooperation of Folk high schools.

The "Centre Européen de la Culture" established in 1949 in Geneva developed, under the directorship of Denis de Rougemont, the idea of having a number of "Foyers de Culture" throughout Europe in and through which European culture in its diversity and unity could be experienced and spread. Oscar Guermonprez, director of the Bergen Folk high school in the Netherlands, imagined in this context an office for documentation and information, with an advisory council representing the whole field of adult education.

The European Bureau for Adult Education was founded in 1953 by representatives from a number of European countries. The Bureau was formally established in Bergen, hosted by the Agency for European Folk high school work. Oscar Guermonprez was the first President.

== Main roles and activities ==
EAEA's main roles:

- Policy advocacy for lifelong learning at a European level;
- Development of practice through projects, publications and training;
- Provision of information and services for members;
- International co-operation.

EAEA’s duties include:

- acting as an advocate for adult learning and for NGOs working in the field of non-formal adult education and lifelong learning
- supporting its members and their networks
- cooperation with other organisations in pursuit of the aims of EAEA
- representing adult education civil society in official working groups and conferences
- providing up-to-date information on EU developments
- giving advice and guidance on project management or dissemination plans
- facilitating contacts with and between adult education stakeholders and other NGOs
- encouraging co-operation in adult learning at European level
- supporting the development of adult learning and raising the visibility of adult education and learning
- promoting shared learning through the exchange of information, knowledge and experience among members
- releasing publications, reports, handbooks as well as project information and results

== Policy areas ==
EAEA advocates for non-formal adult learning. Amongst other topics, advocacy topics include:

- Awareness Raising for Adult education (e.g. through the ARALE project)
- Outreach to marginalised groups (e.g. through OED project)
- Validation of non-formal and informal learning (e.g. through ROM-ACT project)
- Adult education in EU programmes and EU policies (Erasmus+ programme, European Social Fund (ESF), European Agenda for Adult Learning)
- Adult education and international issues (e.g. development)

== Projects coordinated by EAEA ==
- ARALE
- AVA
- OED
- RENEWAL

== Members ==
EAEA, with 123 member organisations in 42 countries, represents more than 60 million learners Europe-wide. There are two types of members:

Ordinary members:

- Adult education as main occupation
- Background: non-profit, non-governmental, a national organisation or provider
- Benefits: information, services, invitations, right to vote and to propose candidates

Associate members:

- Adult education as main occupation
- Background: non-profit (local, regional, international)
- Benefits: information, services, invitations

Countries represented: Armenia, Austria, Azerbaijan, Belarus, Belgium, Bosnia and Herzegovina, Bulgaria, Croatia, Cyprus, Czech Republic, Denmark, Estonia, Finland, France, Georgia, Germany, Greece, Hungary, Iceland, Ireland, Israel, Italy, Latvia, Liechtenstein, Lithuania, Macedonia, Malta, the Netherlands, Norway, Poland, Portugal, Romania, Russia, Serbia, Slovakia, Slovenia, Spain, Sweden, Switzerland, Turkey, Ukraine, United Kingdom

== EAEA Grundtvig Award ==
The EAEA Grundtvig Award rewards every year projects in adult education that offer innovative or original ideas, partnerships and methodologies in adult learning. The EAEA Grundtvig Award was launched in 2003 by EAEA in order to celebrate excellence in adult education. Each year the Award has a different theme.

The Award is named after Nikolai Frederik Severin Grundtvig (1783–1872), a Danish educator mainly influential in the development of non-formal adult education in Europe and worldwide. He provided the adult education sector a foundational philosophy that underpins much of the work in lifelong learning and laid the ground work for the development of learning centres, in all kinds of contexts, from residential educational institutions to agricultural co-operatives.

== Younger staff training ==
EAEA organises an annual training "European Adult Education and Lifelong Learning – Introduction for younger staff". The objectives are to learn about European developments in adult education and lifelong learning, to exchange information and knowledge about each other's organisations, to understand advocacy work at European level and adult education backgrounds, to learn about EAEA and other key civil society organisations.

== Publications ==
Brochures and leaflets

- Why is adult education important?
- Grundtvig Award brochures 2010-2014

EAEA Policy Reports within the field of adult education and lifelong learning.

- Adult Education in Europe 2014 – A Civil Society View
- Adult Education in Times of Crisis

EAEA Monograph Series 1993–1999: A discontinued series publishing the results and final reports of EAEA projects.
