= Steve Young (software engineer) =

British researcher (born 1951)

Steve Young CBE FRS FREng
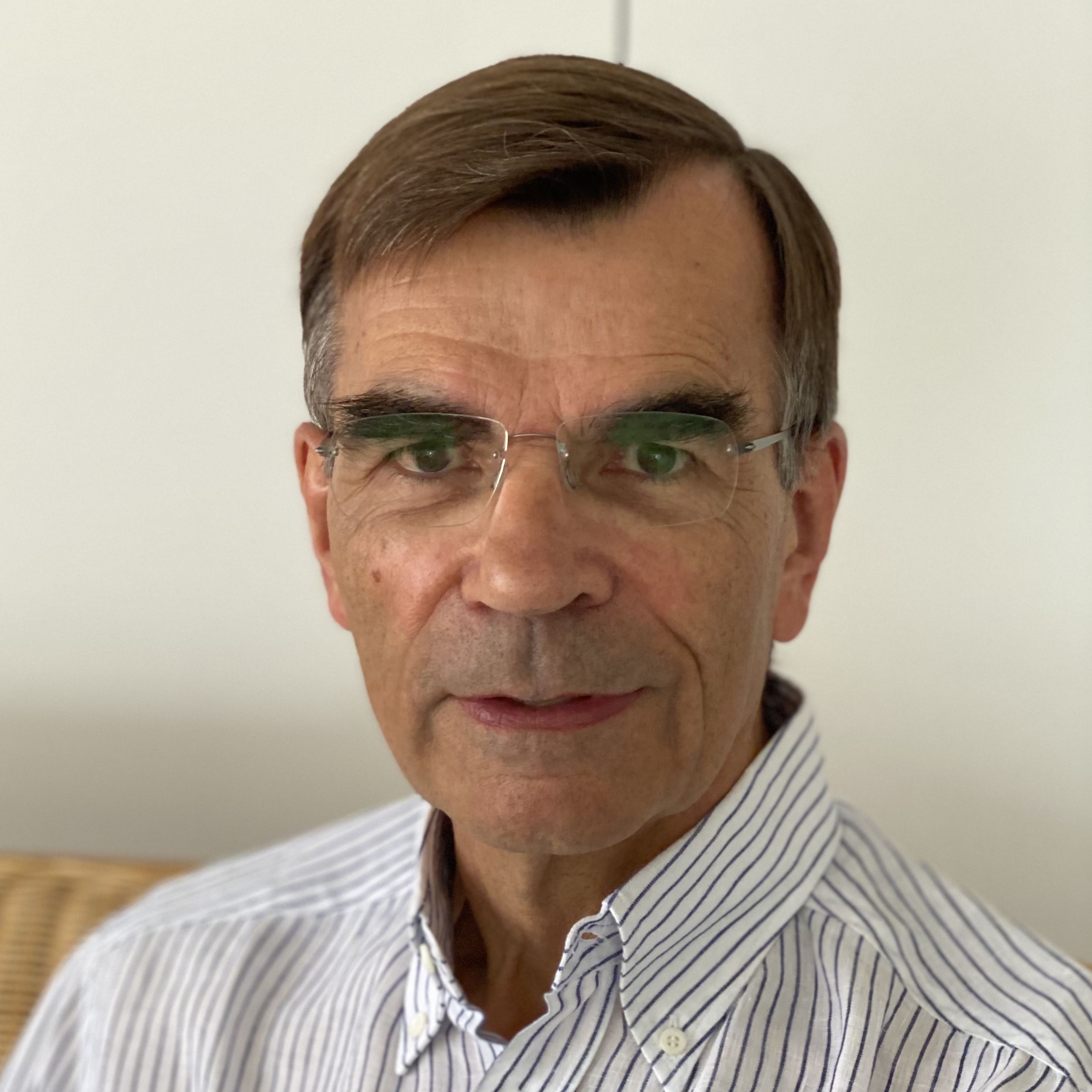
- Born: Stephen John Young; 1951 (age 74–75); Liverpool, United Kingdom
- Education: University of Cambridge
- Known for: HTK toolkit; Spoken dialogue system
- Scientific career
- Fields: Conversational AI; Automatic Speech Recognition; Spoken Dialogue System
- Workplaces: University of Cambridge
- Thesis: Speech synthesis from concept with applications to speech output from systems (1978)
- Doctoral advisor: Frank Fallside
- Website: mi.eng.cam.ac.uk/~sjy

Stephen John Young (born 23 January 1951) is a British computer scientist, academic, and entrepreneur. He is an emeritus professor of information engineering at the University of Cambridge. His research has focused on automatic speech recognition, machine learning, speech synthesis, conversational artificial intelligence, and statistical spoken dialogue systems. He is known for developing the Hidden Markov Model Toolkit (HTK) and for his research on statistical approaches to spoken dialogue management.

Young was elected a Fellow of the Royal Society in 2020 and is a Fellow of the Royal Academy of Engineering, the Institution of Engineering and Technology, the Institute of Electrical and Electronics Engineers, and the International Speech Communication Association. He was appointed Commander of the Order of the British Empire (CBE) in the 2022 Birthday Honours for services to software engineering.

== Early life and education ==
Young was born in Liverpool on 23 January 1951. He studied at the University of Cambridge, completing a BA in Electrical Sciences in 1973 and a PhD in speech recognition in 1978, under the supervision of Professor Frank Fallside at the Engineering Department.

== Academic career ==
Young became Head of the Department of Engineering's Information Engineering Division and later served as Head of the School of Technology from 2001 to 2004. From 2009 to 2015, he was Senior Pro-Vice-Chancellor of the University of Cambridge, with responsibilities that included university planning and resources.

His research has concentrated on statistical modelling of speech and language. He developed the HTK Toolkit, a software package for building speech-recognition systems using hidden Markov models. The toolkit was initially developed at the Cambridge University Engineering Department's Machine Intelligence Laboratory in the late 1980s and subsequently became widely used in speech-recognition research. Young also led work on the HTK Large Vocabulary Speech Recognition System.

Young's later research addressed spoken dialogue systems and the use of statistical methods for managing conversations between people and computers. His work included partially observable Markov decision process (POMDP) approaches to dialogue management and the Hidden Information State model.

He has published and co-authored research in speech processing, machine learning, and software engineering. He served as editor of the journal Computer Speech and Language from 1993 to 2004.

== Entrepreneurship and industry ==
Young has been involved in the commercial development of speech and language technologies. He was a founder and vice president of engineering at Entropic, a company established to commercialize speech-recognition technology developed at Cambridge. Microsoft acquired Entropic in 1999, after which Young briefly worked at Microsoft before returning to Cambridge.

He later helped found Phonetic Arts, a company specializing in speech synthesis technology. Google acquired Phonetic Arts in 2010.

In 2013, Young co-founded VocalIQ, a company developing technology for spoken dialogue systems. Apple acquired VocalIQ in 2015, and Young subsequently joined Apple's Siri development team. From 2015 to 2019, he held a joint appointment between Cambridge and Apple and worked as a senior member of the Siri team in Cambridge. In September 2023, he joined Amadeus Capital Partners as a venture partner.

In July 2025, Young was appointed a director and chair of the board of Recurvia Limited, formerly known as Inephany Limited.

== Research ==
Steve Young's research has focused primarily on speech and language processing, machine learning, and spoken dialogue systems.

His work has examined the use of statistical and probabilistic methods to enable computers to recognize, synthesize, and respond to human speech. His research interests have included automatic speech recognition, speech synthesis, spoken language understanding, dialogue management, natural-language generation, and conversational artificial intelligence.

=== Speech recognition and hidden Markov models ===
Young's early research concentrated on statistical approaches to automatic speech recognition. A major component of this work was the application of hidden Markov models (HMMs), which represent speech as a sequence of probabilistic states and have historically been widely used for modelling acoustic and linguistic patterns in speech-recognition systems.

Young was the original developer and author of the Hidden Markov Model Toolkit (HTK), a software toolkit designed for constructing and experimenting with HMM-based speech-recognition systems. The toolkit was developed at the University of Cambridge and provided researchers with tools for training, testing, and evaluating speech-recognition models. Cambridge describes Young as the inventor and original author of HTK and notes that he also co-developed the original HTK large-vocabulary speech-recognition system along with Phil Woodland

Young also co-authored research examining the application of hidden Markov models to speech recognition. His work with Mark Gales resulted in a detailed treatment of the use of HMMs for modelling speech, covering their statistical foundations and applications to recognition systems.

=== Speech synthesis and voice modelling ===
A second area of Young's research has been speech synthesis. His work examined statistical approaches to generating speech and modelling characteristics such as fundamental frequency, or F0, which is closely associated with perceived pitch. With Kai Yu, Young investigated continuous F0 modelling for HMM-based statistical parametric speech synthesis. Their research addressed the representation of pitch information within statistical speech-synthesis systems and methods for jointly modelling voicing and fundamental frequency.

Young also worked on voice conversion and voice morphing. Research with Heiga Zen and other collaborators investigated methods for altering characteristics of speech and generating voices with different acoustic properties. His publications from this period included work on high-quality voice morphing, voice conversion for unknown speakers, and emotional prosody.

=== Spoken dialogue systems ===
From the 2000s onward, Young increasingly focused on spoken dialogue systems—computer systems capable of interacting with users through speech. His research addressed a central problem in conversational computing: speech-recognition systems inevitably produce uncertain or ambiguous interpretations, while dialogue managers must nevertheless determine what action a system should take. Young's research moved away from dialogue systems based primarily on fixed rules and hand-crafted decision trees toward statistical models capable of representing uncertainty. He investigated methods in which a dialogue system maintains a probabilistic representation of what it believes the user intends and uses that representation to select its next action.

=== Partially observable Markov decision processes ===
A major part of Young's research in dialogue management involved partially observable Markov decision processes (POMDPs). POMDPs provide a mathematical framework for decision-making when the underlying state of a system cannot be observed directly.

Young and Jason Williams examined POMDPs as a framework for spoken dialogue systems. Their work argued that dialogue managers need mechanisms for modelling uncertainty and an objective measure of dialogue success that can be used to optimize dialogue policies. In this framework, the system maintains a probabilistic belief about the state of a conversation rather than treating its interpretation of the user's request as certain. Because exact optimization of POMDPs can be computationally difficult, Young and his collaborators developed approximation methods intended to make the framework practical for real dialogue systems. Their research included summary POMDPs, belief-state representations, policy optimization, and methods for scaling dialogue-management algorithms.

In 2010, Young and collaborators published "The Hidden Information State Model: A Practical Framework for POMDP-Based Spoken Dialogue Management". The paper described the Hidden Information State (HIS) model, an approximation designed to make POMDP-based dialogue management computationally practical. The model represents uncertainty about the state of a conversation and uses probabilistic updates as new information becomes available.

=== Statistical dialogue management and reinforcement learning ===
Young's research also examined reinforcement learning as a means of optimizing dialogue strategies. Rather than specifying every conversational response manually, statistical dialogue systems can learn policies that determine which action to take in a particular conversational state.

His Cambridge research group investigated reinforcement-learning algorithms for estimating and optimizing the parameters of statistical dialogue systems. This work included Bayesian methods, Gaussian-process optimization, belief-state updating, and policy learning. The research addressed several practical problems in spoken dialogue, including speech-recognition errors, incomplete user responses, uncertainty about user intentions, and the difficulty of collecting sufficient real-world conversational data for training. Young and his collaborators investigated simulated users and error simulation as methods for training and evaluating dialogue systems before deployment with human users.

=== Spoken language understanding and natural-language generation ===
Young's research has also covered the components that connect speech recognition with dialogue management. These include semantic parsing, spoken-language understanding, language modelling, and natural-language generation.

His work with collaborators investigated methods for transforming speech-recognition output into structured semantic representations that a dialogue manager could use. Other research examined statistical language generation, including graphical-model approaches and active learning.

This research formed part of a broader statistical architecture in which speech recognition, language understanding, dialogue management, and speech generation are treated as interconnected probabilistic components rather than as completely independent deterministic modules. In his 2010 overview of statistical spoken dialogue systems, Young argued that probabilistic modelling could allow the different components to account for uncertainty and make use of contextual evidence throughout the interaction.

=== Conversational artificial intelligence ===
Young's later research has addressed conversational artificial intelligence more broadly. The Royal Society describes his principal research interests as artificial intelligence and machine learning, particularly their application to speech and language processing in conversational agents.

His work has consequently covered the complete conversational pipeline, including speech recognition, natural-language understanding, dialogue management, speech synthesis, and the use of machine learning to improve interaction between people and computers. He has also examined cognitive user interfaces and the design of systems intended to interact with users through natural language.

Young's academic research has been closely connected with practical development. His work on spoken dialogue systems informed his later involvement with commercial conversational technologies, including VocalIQ and, following Apple's acquisition of the company, the development of Siri. From 2015 to 2019 he worked as a senior member of Apple's Siri development team in Cambridge.

=== Research publications ===
Young has published extensively in speech processing, machine learning, and spoken dialogue systems. His Cambridge profile records more than 400 papers authored or co-authored by him. His publications have appeared in journals and conference proceedings including Computer Speech & Language, IEEE Transactions on Audio, Speech, and Language Processing, Proceedings of the IEEE, the Association for Computational Linguistics, the International Speech Communication Association, and IEEE conferences.

Among his frequently cited works are research on POMDP-based spoken dialogue systems, the Hidden Information State model, statistical dialogue management, HMM-based speech recognition, speech synthesis, and dialogue-policy optimization.

== Awards and honours ==
Young is a Fellow of the Royal Academy of Engineering, the Institution of Engineering and Technology (IET), the Institute of Electrical and Electronics Engineers (IEEE), the RSA and the International Speech Communication Association (ISCA).

He received the IEEE Signal Processing Society Technical Achievement Award in 2004, and the ISCA Medal for Scientific Achievement in 2010. He also received the European Signal Processing Society Individual Technical Achievement Award in 2013, the IEEE James L Flanagan Speech and Audio Processing Award in 2015, and the IEEE Carl Friedrich Gauss Education Award in 2021.

In 2020 he was elected a Fellow of the Royal Society (FRS).

Young was appointed Commander of the Order of the British Empire (CBE) in the 2022 Birthday Honours for services to software engineering.
