= Lori Lamel =

Speech processing researcher

Lori Faith Lamel is a speech processing researcher known for her work with the TIMIT corpus of American English speech and for her work on voice activity detection, speaker recognition, and other non-linguistic inferences from speech signals. She works for the French National Centre for Scientific Research (CNRS) as a senior research scientist in the Spoken Language Processing Group of the Laboratoire d'Informatique pour la Mécanique et les Sciences de l'Ingénieur.

== Education and career ==
Lamel was a student at the Massachusetts Institute of Technology (MIT), where she earned bachelor's and master's degrees in electrical engineering and computer science in 1980 as a co-op student with Bell Labs. She earned her Ph.D. at MIT in 1988, with the dissertation Formalizing Knowledge used in Spectrogram Reading: Acoustic and perceptual evidence from stops supervised by Victor Zue. She completed a habilitation in 2004 at Paris-Sud University.

She was a visiting researcher at CNRS in 1989–1990, became a researcher for CNRS in 1991, and was promoted to senior researcher in 2005.

== Recognition ==
Lamel was named a fellow of the International Speech Communication Association in 2015, "for contributions to human-machine interaction via multilingual speech processing". She was named a Fellow of the IEEE in 2021, "for contributions to automatic speech recognition".
