= Victor Zue =

American computer scientist (born c. 1944)

Victor W. Zue
- Born: c. 1944 (age 81–82); Sichuan, China
- Education: University of Florida (BS); Massachusetts Institute of Technology (DSc)
- Spouse: Stephanie Seneff
- Awards: NAE Member; Academia Sinicia
- Scientific career
- Fields: Computer science
- Workplaces: Massachusetts Institute of Technology
- Doctoral advisor: Kenneth N. Stevens
- Doctoral students: Lori Lamel; Helen Meng; Tara Sainath

Victor Waito Zue (born c. 1944) is a Chinese American computer scientist and professor at Massachusetts Institute of Technology.

From 1989 to 2001, he headed the Spoken Language Systems Group at the MIT Laboratory for Computer Science. The group pioneered the development of many systems enabling interactions between human and computers using spoken language. Then, he served a ten-year tenure as Director of the Lab for Computer Science (LCS), and the Co-Director and Director of the Computer Science and Artificial Intelligence Lab (CSAIL). Since 2001, Victor has returned to teaching and research from the director position in 2011. He is also a distinguished research chair professor at NTU Taiwan.

== Biography ==
Zue was born in Sichuan, China, and was raised in Taiwan and Hong Kong. He came to the US at age 18 to study at the University of Florida. He graduated with his bachelor's degree in electrical engineering in 1968. He received his Sc.D. from the Massachusetts Institute of Technology in 1976. In the early part of his career, Zue studied acoustics, phonetics, and phonological properties of American English. His research interest shifted to the development of spoken language interfaces to make human-computer interactions easier and more natural. Between 1989 and 2001, he led the Spoken Language Systems Group at the MIT Laboratory for Computer Science. During this time, he helped lead development of the TIMIT Acoustic-Phonetic Continuous Speech Corpus. Zue collaborates with and is married to fellow MIT researcher Stephanie Seneff.

== Honours and awards ==
Zue is a Fellow of the Acoustical Society of America, the American Association for the Advancement of Science, and the International Speech Communication Association. He is an elected member of the U.S. National Academy of Engineering, and an Academician of the Academia Sinica in Taiwan. He received the Okawa Prize in 2012, and the IEEE James L. Flanagan Speech and Audio Processing Award in 2013.

== External references ==
- Q&A with MIT's Victor Zue
