= Stephanie Seneff =

American anti-vaccination activist

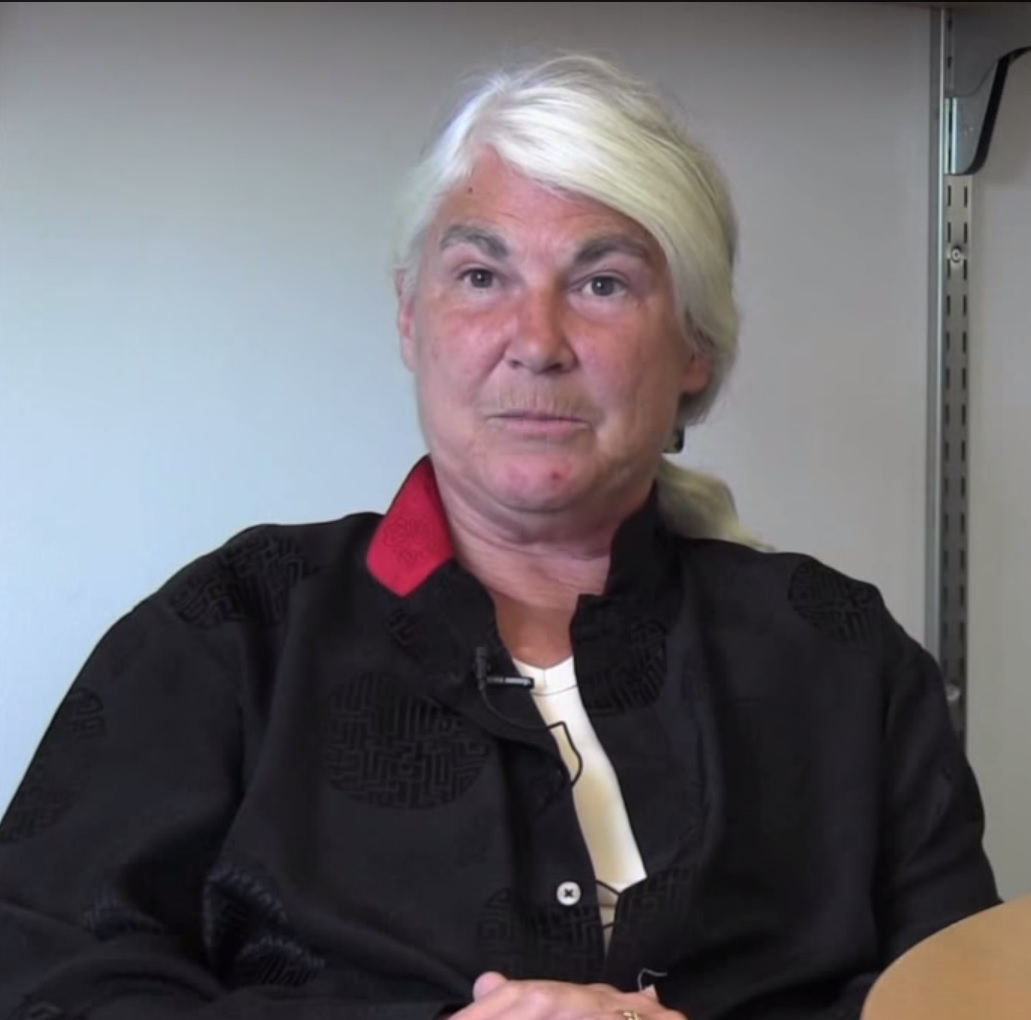
- Seneff in 2014
- Born: April 20, 1948 (age 78); Columbia, Missouri
- Education: Massachusetts Institute of Technology (BS, MS, PhD)
- Spouse: Victor Zue
- Scientific career
- Fields: Computer science
- Workplaces: Massachusetts Institute of Technology
- Thesis: Pitch and spectral analysis of speech based on an auditory synchrony model (1985)
- Doctoral advisor: Kenneth N. Stevens
- Doctoral students: Helen Meng
- Website: Seneff - MIT

Stephanie Seneff (born April 20, 1948) is an American computer scientist and anti-vaccine activist. She is a senior research scientist at the Computer Science and Artificial Intelligence Laboratory (CSAIL) of the Massachusetts Institute of Technology (MIT). In her early career, she worked primarily in the Spoken Language Systems group, where her research at CSAIL focused on human–computer interaction, and algorithms for language understanding and speech recognition. In 2011, she began publishing controversial papers in low-impact, open access journals on biology and medical topics; the articles have received "heated objections from experts in almost every field she's delved into," according to the food columnist Ari LeVaux.

== Career ==
Seneff attended the Massachusetts Institute of Technology (MIT), earning her Bachelor of Science (BS) in Biophysics in 1968, Master's (MS) and Engineering (E.E.) degrees in Electrical Engineering in 1980, and a doctoral degree (PhD) in computer science and Electrical Engineering in 1985. She is a senior research scientist at the MIT Computer Science and Artificial Intelligence Laboratory (CSAIL). Her research career focused on using computational modeling and analysis of the human auditory system to improve communication between humans and computers. She was elected a Fellow of the International Speech Communication Association (ISCA) in 2012 as recognition for her "contributions to conversational human-computer systems and computer-assisted language learning". Seneff collaborates with and is married to MIT professor Victor Zue.

== Biology and Medical Topics ==
In 2011, Seneff began publishing articles on topics related to biology and medicine in low-impact, open access journals, such as Interdisciplinary Toxicology, as well as eight papers in the MDPI journal Entropy between 2011 and 2015. According to the food columnist A. LeVaux, Seneff's work in this area has made her "a controversial figure in the scientific community" and she has received "heated objections from experts in most every field she's delved into".

In 2013, she coauthored a paper that associated the herbicide glyphosate with a wide variety of diseases such as cancer and disorders such as autism. Discover magazine writer Keith Kloor criticized the uncritical republication of the study's results by other media outlets. Jerry Steiner, the executive vice president of sustainability at Monsanto, said in an interview regarding the study that "We are very confident in the long track record that glyphosate has. It has been very, very extensively studied." Seneff's claim that glyphosate is a major cause of autism and that, "At today's rates, by 2025, half the kids born will be diagnosed with autism," has also been criticized. For example, Pacific Standard noted that, contrary to Seneff's claims, many scientific reviews have found that the rise in autism rates over the past 20 years is due to changes in diagnostic practices, and that a number of studies, including a 2012 review in the Journal of Toxicology and Environmental Health, have found little evidence that glyphosate is associated with adverse development outcomes.

In the wake of the COVID-19 pandemic, Seneff published on alleged vaccine adverse effects. In 2022, she co-authored the article "Innate immune suppression by SARS-CoV-2 mRNA vaccinations: The role of G-quadruplexes, exosomes, and MicroRNAs" in the peer-reviewed journal Food and Chemical Toxicology with Peter A. McCullough, a cardiologist known for spreading disinformation during the pandemic. Multiple scientists requested a retraction of the paper due to inaccuracies, mis-representations of cited works, and claims not based in evidence. The editors of FCT refused to retract the paper but published a letter to the editor written by concerned scientists.

Seneff and her MIT colleagues have also published on the health impacts of fat and cholesterol consumption in America. Based on this work, Seneff claimed that Americans are suffering from a cholesterol deficiency, not an excess. In 2014–2016 Seneff was proposed as an expert witness for litigators seeking damages from Pfizer associated with their cholesterol drug Lipitor, but the court dismissed the claim largely because Seneff lacked expert status and failed to provide credible evidence linking Lipitor to any specific harm.

=== International Journal of Vaccine Theory, Practice, and Research ===
Seneff is an editor of an anti-vaccine journal called International Journal of Vaccine Theory, Practice, and Research (IJVTPR). The journal is known for promoting misinformation about COVID-19 vaccines. In May 2021, Seneff published a paper with co-author Greg Nigh (a naturopath) titled "Worse Than the Disease? Reviewing Some Possible Unintended Consequences of the mRNA Vaccines Against COVID-19" in the then-brand new IJVTPR.

=== Response from scientists and academics ===
Clinical neurologist and skeptic Steven Novella criticized Seneff's Entropy publication for making "correlation is causation" assumptions using broad statistical extrapolations from limited data, saying "she has published only speculations and gives many presentations, but has not created any new data". Scientists and scholars such as Derek Lowe, a medicinal chemist, and Jeffrey Beall, a library scientist known for his criticism of predatory open access publishers, have separately criticized Seneff's paper for misrepresenting the results and conclusions of other researchers' work. Lowe and Beall also noted that Entropy and its publisher, MDPI, have a known history of publishing studies without merit.

A 2017 Review Article written by Kings College of London researchers and published by Frontiers in Public Health called Seneff's glyphosate health-risk research claims "a deductive reasoning approach based on syllogism" and "at best unsubstantiated theories, speculations or simply incorrect." Consumers Union senior scientist Michael Hansen characterized Seneff and her glyphosate claims as "nutty", "truly unhinged", and "dangerous".

== Bibliography ==
- — (2021). Toxic Legacy: How the Weedkiller Glyphosate Is Destroying Our Health and the Environment. Chelsea Green Publishing. ISBN 978-1-60358-930-7. 272 pages
