= Mari Ostendorf =

Professor of electrical engineering

- Education: Stanford University (B.S., 1980; M.S., 1981; Ph.D., 1985;)
- Awards: Member of the National Academy Engineering (2021); IEEE James L. Flanagan Speech and Audio Processing Award (2018)
- Scientific career
- Fields: Electrical Engineering
- Workplaces: University of Washington (1999 - present); Boston University (1987 - 1999); BBN Technologies (1985 - 1987)
- Doctoral advisor: Robert Gray

Mari Ostendorf is a professor of electrical engineering in the area of speech and language technology and the vice provost for research at the University of Washington.

== Biography ==
She received her doctorate degree from Stanford University in 1984 under Robert Gray and afterwards worked at BBN and as a professor at Boston University before coming to University of Washington in 1999.

In the late 1980s, Ostendorf was one of several speech recognition experts that began to be involved in the computational linguistics community after a series of DARPA workshops involving experts from both domains. She remains active in both the speech and natural language processing communities.

Ostendorf was instrumental in designing the ToBI standard for transcribing and annotating the prosody of speech in the period between 1991 and 1994. Ostendorf participated in multiple DARPA programs including GALE in 2005 and Babel in 2012.

She was the lead faculty advisor for the student team that won the 2017 Amazon Alexa Prize for the design of a conversational AI on the Alexa platform.

== Awards ==
In 2005, Ostendorf was named Fellow of the Institute of Electrical and Electronics Engineers (IEEE) and, in 2008, she was named a Fellow of the International Speech Communication Association for her contributions to the study of prosody and rich transcription.

Ostendorf is the recipient of the 2018 IEEE James L. Flanagan Speech and Audio Processing Award.

Ostendorf was selected as a fellow of the Association for Computational Linguistics in 2018 for "significant contributions to prosody, pronunciation, acoustic, language modeling, and developments in using out-of-domain data and discourse structure."

In 2019, she was elected to the Washington State Academy of Sciences. In 2020 she was elected as a corresponding member of the Royal Society of Edinburgh.

In February 2021, Ostendorf was elected to the National Academy of Engineering (NAE) "for contributions to statistical and prosodic models for speech and natural language processing and for advances in conversational dialogue systems."
