= Chin-Hui Lee =

Information scientist

- 李錦輝
- Born: Taiwan
- Education: National Taiwan University (BS); Yale University (MS); University of Washington (PhD)
- Awards: ISCA Annual Medal (2012); IEEE James L. Flanagan Speech and Audio Processing Award (2027)
- Scientific career
- Fields: Speech processing
- Workplaces: Georgia Institute of Technology, AT&T Bell Laboratories
- Doctoral advisor: R. Douglas Martin

Chin-Hui Lee (Chinese: 李錦輝) is a Taiwanese information scientist best known for his work in speech recognition, speaker recognition and acoustic signal processing. He joined Georgia Institute of Technology in 2002 as a professor in the school of electrical and computer engineering

He was previously a director of the dialogue systems research department at AT&T Bell Laboratories

== Life and career ==
Lee received his doctorate in electrical engineering with a minor in statistics from the University of Washington in 1981, his master's degree in engineering and applied science from Yale University in 1977, and his undergraduate degree in electrical engineering from National Taiwan University in 1973. He started his industrial career as a senior research scientist at Verbex Corporation in 1981 and later joined AT&T Bell Laboratories as a distinguished member of technical staff and the director of the dialogue systems research department. He joined the school of electrical and computer engineering at Georgia Institute of Technology as a full professor in September 2002 after serving as a distinguished visiting professor at the National University of Singapore’s school of computing for one year.

== Awards and recognitions ==
- IEEE James L. Flanagan Speech and Audio Processing Award, for contributions to and leadership in automatic speech and speaker recognition, including innovations in adaptive learning and discriminative training, 2027
- IEEE SPS Best Paper Award, 2018
- ISCA Annual Medal, 2012
- Fellow, ISCA, for contributions in adaptive learning, discriminative training and utterance verification, 2012
- Plenary Speaker, International Conference on Acoustics, Speech, and Signal Processing, 2012
- IEEE SPS Technical Achievement Award, for exceptional contributions to the field of automatic speech recognition, 2006
- Fellow, IEEE, for contributions to automatic speech and speaker recognition, 1997
- Bell Labs President's Gold Award, 1997

== Selected publications ==
- Gauvain, J. L.; Chin-Hui, Lee (April 1994). "Maximum a posteriori estimation for multivariate Gaussian mixture observations of Markov chains". IEEE Transactions on Speech and Audio Processing. 2 (2): 291–298. Bibcode:1994ITSAP...2..291G. doi:10.1109/89.279278. S2CID 2814093.
- Xu, Yong; Du, Jun; Dai, Li-Rong; Lee, Chin-Hui (January 2015). "A Regression Approach to Speech Enhancement Based on Deep Neural Networks". IEEE/ACM Transactions on Audio, Speech, and Language Processing. 23 (1): 7–19. Bibcode:2015ITASL..23....7X. doi:10.1109/TASLP.2014.2364452. ISSN 2329-9290. S2CID 206602390.
- Biing-Hwang Juang; Wu Hou; Chin-Hui Lee (May 1997). "Minimum classification error rate methods for speech recognition". IEEE Transactions on Speech and Audio Processing. 5 (3): 257–265. Bibcode:1997ITSAP...5..257B. doi:10.1109/89.568732.
- Xu, Yong; Du, Jun; Dai, Li-Rong; Lee, Chin-Hui (January 2014). "An Experimental Study on Speech Enhancement Based on Deep Neural Networks". IEEE Signal Processing Letters. 21 (1): 65–68. Bibcode:2014ISPL...21...65X. doi:10.1109/LSP.2013.2291240. ISSN 1070-9908. S2CID 4228271.
