= Tokuda =

Tokuda (written: 徳田) is a Japanese surname. Notable people with the surname include:

- Atsuko Tokuda (徳田 敦子), Japanese badminton player
- Jill Tokuda, American politician
- Keiichi Tokuda, Japanese engineer
- Kip Tokuda (1946–2013), American social worker and politician
- Kyuichi Tokuda (徳田 球一, 1894–1953), Japanese politician
- Shigeo Tokuda (徳田 重男, born 1934), Japanese porn actor
- Shinnosuke Tokuda (徳田 新之介, born 1995), Japanese handball player
- Shūsei Tokuda (徳田 秋声, 1872–1943), Japanese author
- Takeshi Tokuda (徳田 毅, born 1971), Japanese politician
- Tokuda Yasokichi (徳田 八十吉, 1873–1956), Japanese potter
