= Tara Sainath =

American computer scientist

Tara N. Sainath is an American computer scientist whose research involves deep learning applied to speech recognition. She is a principal research scientist at Google Research.

== Education and career ==
Sainath was a student of electrical and engineering and computer science at the Massachusetts Institute of Technology, where she received a bachelor's degree, a master's degree in 2005, and a Ph.D. in 2009. Her master's thesis was Acoustic Landmark Detection and Segmentation using the McAulay-Quatieri Sinusoidal Model, supervised by Timothy Hazen, and her doctoral dissertation was Applications of Broad Class Knowledge for Noise Robust Speech Recognition, supervised by Victor Zue.

She worked for IBM Research at the Thomas J. Watson Research Center before moving to Google Research.

== Recognition ==
Sainath was elected both as an IEEE Fellow and as a fellow of the International Speech Communication Association in 2022, in both cases "for contributions to deep learning for automatic speech recognition".
