= David Colleen =

American businessman and architect

- Education: Cornell University
- Occupations: Architect businessperson

David Colleen is an American businessman and architect. He has been the chief executive officer (CEO) of SapientX since co-founding it in 2016. Previously, he founded Planet 9 Studios and was its CEO from 1994 to 2016.

== Early life and education ==
Born in the United States, Colleen attended Cornell University and graduated with a bachelor's degree in architecture, business administration, and management in 1981.

== Career ==
After relocating to San Francisco, Colleen joined an architectural firm, where he specialized in designing commercial buildings. During that period, he adapted 2D drafting software, developed in the 1980s to create 3D design simulations. He later collaborated with Harley Wagner Integrated in West Michigan to expand his firm's outreach.

In 1991, Colleen founded Planet 9 and served as its CEO until 2016. Under his tenure, Planet 9 specialized in constructing 3D models of buildings, streets, and various structures, using textures from digitized photographs. The company modeled over 15 cities, including Austin, San Francisco, Tokyo, New York (city), and San Diego. The process involved capturing up to 2,000 photographs of a city, creating foundational models, and then integrating the images. The models used the Virtual Reality Modeling Language (VRML) for online navigation, requiring a VRML plug-in. In 1996, Planet 9 built a baseball park simulation based on the San Francisco Giants' plans. The company later created a prototype 3D conference room for SPS Payment and a VRML environment for Schlumberger. In the 1990s, Planet 9 was recognized as a leading company in the virtual reality sector.

In 1995, Colleen built VRML-based Virtual SOMA, a 3-D model of the SOuth of MArket Street in San Francisco, and showcased it at the Microsoft booth at the SigGraph conference. In 1997, he and his team developed Virtual Tokyo, a 3D representation of the Shinjuku district in Tokyo.

In 1999, Colleen gave a lecture at the Oklahoma City University, titled "Technology Builds Community".

In 2016, Colleen co-founded SapientX with Bruce Wilcox and Maclen Marvit. Prior to this, the founders had developed AI-driven, 3D, conversational characters in 2003, which were later incorporated into a Multiverse platform, RayGun, in 2008. In the same year, SapientX released public AI chatbots that mimicked the voices of Hillary Clinton and Donald Trump.
