= John Makhoul =

American computer scientist

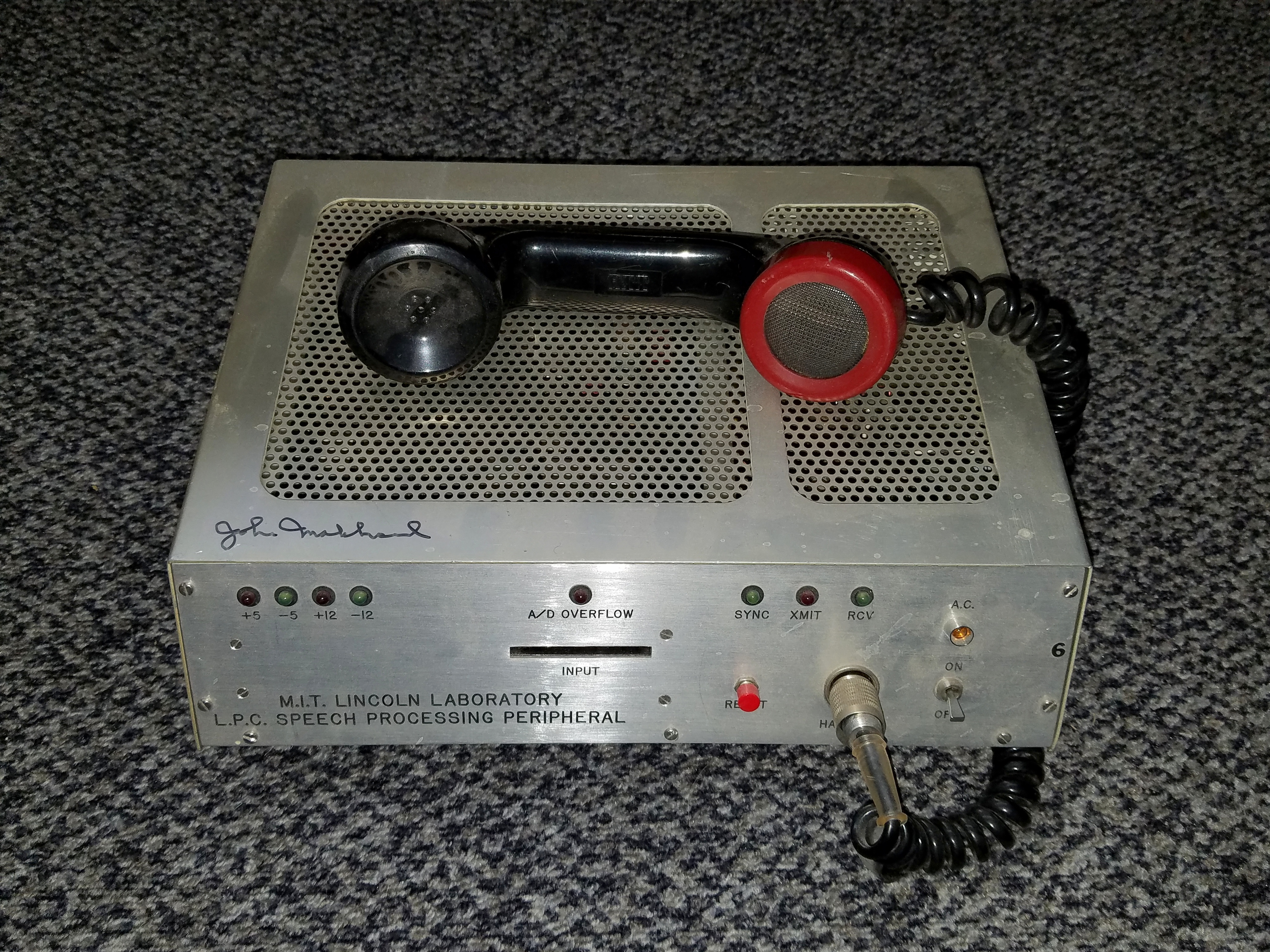
Prototype telephone for the Network Voice Protocol, signed by John Makhoul

John Makhoul (born 1942) is a Lebanese-American computer scientist who works in the field of speech and language processing. Dr. Makhoul's work on linear predictive coding was used in the establishment of the Network Voice Protocol, which enabled the transmission of speech signals over the ARPANET. Makhoul is recognized in the field for his vital role in the areas of speech and language processing, including speech analysis, speech coding, speech recognition and speech understanding. He has made a number of significant contributions to the mathematical modeling of speech signals, including his work on linear prediction, and vector quantization. His patented work on the direct application of speech recognition techniques for accurate, language-independent optical character recognition (OCR) has had a dramatic impact on the ability to create OCR systems in multiple languages relatively quickly.

Dr. Makhoul is a Chief Scientist at BBN Technologies, where he has led several successful research projects including the DARPA GALE program.

== Early life and education ==
Makhoul was born in Deirmimas, a village in southern Lebanon, to an Evangelical family. He did his early schooling in Lebanon. During his high school years, he spent one year as an exchange student in a high school in Foley, Minnesota. He went to college at the American University of Beirut, where he graduated with a Bachelor of Engineering degree in Electrical Engineering in the year 1964. Makhoul then received his Master of Science degree in Electrical Engineering from Ohio State University in 1965, and finished his PhD from MIT in the year 1970. Makhoul has since been working at BBN Technologies.

== Awards and honors ==
Throughout his career, Makhoul has received several awards and honors. He is a Fellow of the IEEE for contributions to the theory of linear prediction and its applications to spectral estimation, speech analysis and data compression and a Fellow of the Acoustical Society of America. In 2013, he became a Fellow of the International Speech Communication Association (ISCA).

Makhoul's 1975 IEEE Proceedings paper on linear prediction was named a "Citation Classic" by the Institute for Scientific Information. His other honors include the 1978 IEEE Senior Award, the 1982 IEEE Technical Achievement Award, the 1988 Society Award of the IEEE Signal Processing Society, and the 2000 IEEE Third Millennium Medal.

In 2009, Makhoul was awarded the IEEE James L. Flanagan Speech and Audio Processing Award, which is awarded for an outstanding contribution to the advancement of speech and/or audio signal processing.

In 2016, he received the ISCA Medal for "leadership and extensive contributions to speech and language processing ".
