= Hemami =

Hemami (Persian: همامی) is a surname of Iranian origin. Notable people with the surname include:

- Alireza Mokhtari Hemami (born 1977), Iranian parathlete
- Sheila Hemami, American electrical engineer and entrepreneur
- Taraneh Hemami (born 1960), Iranian-born American visual artist, curator, and arts educator
