= Helen Meng =

Chinese computer scientist

Helen Mei Ling Meng (Chinese: 蒙美玲) is a Chinese computer scientist, the Patrick Huen Wing Ming Professor of Systems Engineering and Engineering Management at the Chinese University of Hong Kong. Her research focuses on artificial intelligence in speech processing.

== Education and career ==
After finishing her studies at the Diocesan Girls' School in Hong Kong in 1983, Meng went to the Massachusetts Institute of Technology. There, she received a bachelor's degree in 1989 and a master's degree in 1991 before completing her Ph.D. in 1995. Her doctoral thesis, Phonological Parsing for Bi-directional Letter-to-Sound/Sound-to-Letter Generation, was jointly supervised by Stephanie Seneff and Victor Zue.

She became a faculty member at the Chinese University of Hong Kong in 1998. founded the Stanley Ho Big Data Decision Analytics Research Center in 2013, and chaired the Department of Systems Engineering and Engineering from 2012 to 2018. She was given the Patrick Huen Wing Ming Professorship in 2021. She is a Fellow of the United College of Hong Kong, and the former editor-in-chief of the IEEE Transactions on Audio, Speech and Language Processing.

== Recognition ==
Meng was elected as an IEEE Fellow, in the 2013 class of fellows, "for contributions to spoken language and multimodal systems". She was elected as a Fellow of the International Speech Communication Association in 2016, "for contributions to multilingual, multimodal human-computer interaction and language-learning technologies". She is also a fellow of the Hong Kong Computer Society and Hong Kong Institution of Engineers.
