= Allen Gersho =

Allen Gersho is a professor emeritus at UCSB who made significant contributions in the area of signal compression and speech coding.

Gersho received his undergraduate degree in Electrical Engineering at MIT in 1960. He received his PhD in Electrical Engineering from Cornell University in 1963.

From 1963 until 1980, he was a member of the technical staff in the research division of AT&T Bell Labs before joining UCSB as a professor in 1980. He took early retirement from UCSB in 1999 and was CEO of SignalCom, Inc from 1996 till 2000 when the company was sold to Microsoft.

Gersho co-authored a text book with Robert Gray on vector quantization that has become a standard reference for that topic.

== Awards ==
Gersho is an IEEE Fellow for contributions to the theory of signal processing in communications, and the recipient of several awards and honors and in particular he was awarded the 2007 IEEE James L. Flanagan Speech and Audio Processing Award.
