= Shrikanth Narayanan =

Indian-American researcher

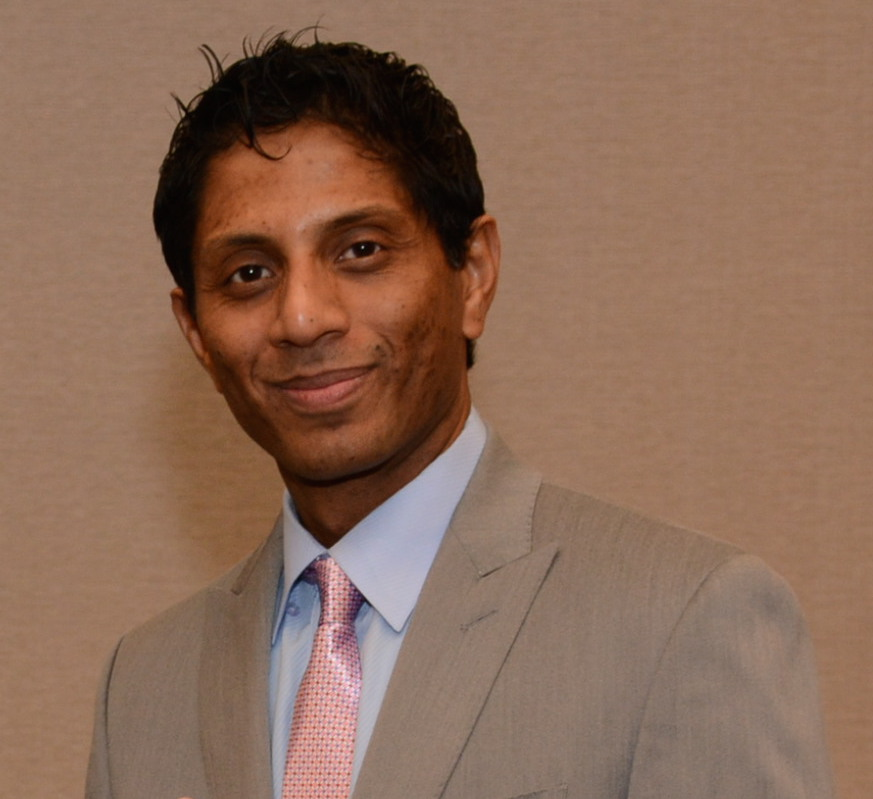
- Born: New Delhi
- Occupation: Professor
- Awards: Member of the National Academy of Engineering (2026); Guggenheim Fellow; ISCA Medal for Scientific Achievement (2023); IEEE SPS Claude Shannon-Harry Nyquist Technical Achievement Award (2023); IEEE James L. Flanagan Speech and Audio Processing Award (2025); IEEE Computer Society Edward J. McCluskey Technical Achievement Award (2024); Mellon Mentoring Award; Engineer's Council Distinguished Engineering Educator

Academic background
- Education: Ph.D, M.S., B.E.
- Alma mater: University of California, Los Angeles, College of Engineering, Guindy
- Doctoral advisor: Abeer Alwan

Academic work
- Discipline: Scientist, Engineer
- Institutions: University of Southern California, AT&T Labs-Research
- Notable works: Behavioral Signal Processing, Speech Imaging, Affective Computing

Shrikanth Narayanan is an Indian-American Professor at the University of Southern California. He is an interdisciplinary engineer–scientist with a focus on human-centered signal processing and machine intelligence with speech and spoken language processing at its core. A researcher, educator, and inventor, and patent holder, he has worked in research areas including in computational speech science, speech and language technologies, audio, music and multimedia engineering, human sensing and imaging technologies, emotions research and affective computing, behavioral signal processing, and computational media intelligence.

His contributions continue to impact numerous domains including in human health, national defense/intelligence, and the media arts. His patents have contributed to the proliferation of speech technologies on the cloud and on mobile devices and in enabling novel emotion-aware artificial intelligence technologies.

== Career ==
Shri Narayanan was born in New Delhi, India (1967), and grew up in Madras (Chennai). He received his bachelor's degree in electrical engineering from the College of Engineering-Guindy in 1988 and was recognized with its 2019 Distinguished Alumnus Award. He graduated from the University of California, Los Angeles with obtained an M.S. in 1990, Engineer in 1992, and Ph.D. in 1995. He was the recipient of 2011 Engineering Alumni Professional Achievement Award from UCLA. His early career was at AT&T Bell Laboratories, Murray Hill, and AT&T Research.

He is a university professor at USC, holder of the inaugural Niki and C. L. Max Nikias Chair in Engineering, Vice President for Presidential Initiatives and was the inaugural holder of the Andrew J. Viterbi Professorship in Engineering (2007–2016) at the University of Southern California (USC), where he holds appointments in Departments of Electrical & Computer Engineering, Computer Science, Linguistics, Psychology, Neuroscience, Pediatrics and Otolaryngology-Head & Neck Surgery. He is the founder and director of the USC Signal Analysis and Interpretation Laboratory (SAIL), and the Ming Hsieh Institute, a research director for the USC Information Sciences Institute, and is a member of the Signal and Image Processing Institute. In 2013, he co-founded the company Behavioral Informatix, LLC., which ultimately led to the founding of Behavioral Signal Technologies, Inc. He also co-founded Lyssn, Inc. in 2017.

== Notable professional honors and positions ==
Shri Narayanan is a member of National Academy of Engineering and fellow of the National Academy of Inventors, International Speech Communication Association (ISCA), the Acoustical Society of America (ASA) in 2005, the Institute of Electrical and Electronics Engineers (IEEE), the American Association for the Advancement of Science (AAAS), the Association for Psychological Science (APS), the American Institute for Medical and Biological Engineering (AIMBE), Association for the Advancement of Affective Computing (AAAC) and the Association for Computing Machinery (ACM). He was elected a Distinguished Lecturer by the IEEE Signal Processing Society and the International Speech Communication Association, and served as the American Speech-Language-Hearing Association (ASHA)’s Willard Zemlin Lecturer in 2017. He was awarded the Guggenheim fellowship and elected to the European Academy of Sciences and Arts in 2022. He also currently serves as an Editor for the Computer, Speech and Language Journal (2008–present), having served as editor-in-chief of the IEEE Journal on Selected Topics in Signal Processing (2016–present) (2016–2018), and as an Associate Editor for numerous journals.

He has won numerous research and best paper awards including the 2025 IEEE James L. Flanagan Speech and Audio Processing Award, 2024 Edward J. McCluskey Technical Achievement Award from the IEEE Computer Society, the 2023 ISCA Medal for Scientific Achievement award, the 2023 Claude Shannon-Harry Nyquist Technical Achievement Award from the IEEE Signal Processing Society, 2023 Richard Deswarte Prize in Digital History, two IEEE Signal Processing Society Best Transactions Paper awards (2005, 2009), an International Speech Communication Association Journal paper award (2018), six Interspeech Challenge awards, a 2015 Ten Year Technical Impact Award from ACM ICMI, a 2015 Distinguished Engineering Educator Award and a 2020 Sustained Accomplishment Award from ACM ICMI. In 2026, he was elected to the National Academy of Engineering for "contributions to and leadership in human sensing and machine intelligence with impact on national security, health and media".

He was named by LA Weekly as one of their "fascinating angelenos" for their People 2013 issue.

== Behavioral Signal Technologies ==
Shri Narayanan co-founded Behavioral Signal Technologies Inc. in 2016 with colleagues Alex Potamianos and Prem Natarajan. The company specializes in emotion recognition in speech, predictive and omni-channel behavioural analytics applying Behavioral Signal Processing (BSP) technologies in diverse industries. He serves as its Chief Scientist.

As a precursor to this, Shri Narayanan had co-founded the company Behavioral Informatix in 2013 with his colleagues Matt Black and Alex Potamianos The company specializes in using Behavioral Signal Processing (BSP). The company specializes in using Behavioral Signal Processing (BSP) techniques to help personalize user experiences and assist in decision-making for the healthcare industry.

== Lyssn ==
Shri Narayanan co-founded Lyssn in 2017, a technology company focused on mental health care delivery, treatment and quality assurance.
