= Abeer Alwan =

Speech processing researcher

- Occupations: Electrical engineer and speech processing researcher, Professor at UCLA Henry Samueli School of Engineering and Applied Science

Abeer Alwan is an American electrical engineer and speech processing researcher. She is a professor of electrical and computer engineering in the UCLA Henry Samueli School of Engineering and Applied Science, and vice chair for undergraduate affairs in the Department of Electrical & Computer Engineering.

== Education and career ==
Alwan graduated from Northeastern University with a BSEE in 1983, and completed a doctorate (Sc.D.) in engineering at the Massachusetts Institute of Technology in 1992. Her dissertation, Modeling speech perception in noise : the stop consonants as a case study, was supervised by Kenneth N. Stevens.

She joined the UCLA faculty in 1992, was promoted full professor in 2000, and became vice chair in 2015. She has also served as editor-in-chief of the journal Speech Communication from 2000 to 2003. Her notable students at UCLA include Shrikanth Narayanan.

== Recognition ==
Alwan became a Fellow of the Acoustical Society of America in 2003. She was named a Fellow of the IEEE in 2008, "for contributions to speech perception and production modeling and their applications", and a fellow of the International Speech Communication Association in 2011, "for her contributions to speech perception and production modeling and their application to speech synthesis and recognition". She has also been a Radcliffe Fellow, a distinguished lecturer of the International Speech Communication Association, and a distinguished lecturer of the Asia-Pacific Signal and Information Processing Association.
