= IEEE James L. Flanagan Speech and Audio Processing Award =

- Awarded for: An outstanding contribution to the advancement of speech and/or audio signal processing
- Sponsored by: Institute of Electrical and Electronics Engineers
- First award: 2002
- Website: https://www.ieee.org/about/awards/technical-field-awards/flanagan.html

The IEEE James L. Flanagan Speech and Audio Processing Award is a Technical Field Award presented by the IEEE for an outstanding contribution to the advancement of speech and/or audio signal processing. It may be presented to an individual or a team of up to three people. The award was established by the IEEE Board of Directors in 2002. The award is named after James L. Flanagan, who was a scientist from Bell Labs where he worked on acoustics for many years.

Recipients of this award receive a bronze medal, certificate and honorarium.

== Recipients ==
- 2027: Chin-Hui Lee
- 2026: Alex Acero
- 2025: Shrikanth Narayanan
- 2024: Keiichi Tokuda
- 2023: Alex Waibel
- 2022: Nelson Morgan and Herve Bourlard
- 2021: David Nahamoo
- 2020: Hynek Hermansky
- 2019: Hermann Ney
- 2018: Mari Ostendorf
- 2017: Mark Y. Liberman
- 2016: Takehiro Moriya
- 2015: Steve Young
- 2014: Biing-Hwang Juang
- 2013: Victor Zue
- 2012: James Baker and Janet M. Baker
- 2011: Julia Hirschberg
- 2010: Sadaoki Furui
- 2009: John Makhoul
- 2008: Raj Reddy
- 2007: Allen Gersho
- 2006: James D. Johnston
- 2005: Frederick Jelinek
- 2004: Kenneth N. Stevens
- 2004: Gunnar Fant
