= Yasuo Matsuyama =

Computer scientist

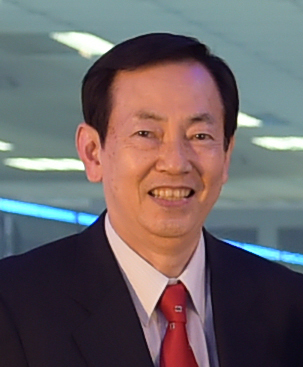
- At the 2017 HPC Connection Workshop
- Born: March 23, 1947 (age 79); Yokohama, Japan
- Education: Waseda University (Dr. Engineering, 1974) Stanford University (PhD, 1978)
- Known for: Alpha-EM algorithm
- Scientific career
- Fields: Machine learning and human-aware information processing
- Workplaces: Waseda University, Stanford University
- Thesis: Studies on Stochastic Modeling of Neurons (Dr. Engineering from Waseda University); Process Distortion Measures and Signal Processing (PhD from Stanford University)
- Doctoral advisor: Waseda University: Jun'ichi Takagi, Kageo Akizuki, and Kastuhiko Shirai for Dr. Engineering Stanford University: Robert M. Gray for PhD
- Website: http://www.f.waseda.jp/yasuo2/en/index.html

Yasuo Matsuyama (born March 23, 1947) is a Japanese researcher in machine learning and human-aware information processing.

Matsuyama is a Professor Emeritus and an Honorary Researcher of the Research Institute of Science and Engineering of Waseda University.

== Early life and education ==
Matsuyama received his bachelor’s, master’s and doctoral degrees in electrical engineering from Waseda University in 1969, 1971, and 1974 respectively. The dissertation title for the Doctor of Engineering is Studies on Stochastic Modeling of Neurons. There, he contributed to the spiking neurons with stochastic pulse-frequency modulation. Advisors were Jun’ichi Takagi, Kageo, Akizuki, and Katsuhiko Shirai.

Upon the completion of the doctoral work at Waseda University, he was dispatched to the United States as a Japan-U.S. exchange fellow by the joint program of the Japan Society for the Promotion of Science, Fulbright Program, and the Institute of International Education. Through this exchange program, he completed his Ph.D. program at Stanford University in 1978. The dissertation title is Process Distortion Measures and Signal Processing. There, he contributed to the theory of probabilistic distortion measures and its applications to speech encoding with spectral clustering or vector quantization. His advisor was Robert. M. Gray.

== Career ==
From 1977 to 1078, Matsuyama was a research assistant at the Information Systems Laboratory of Stanford University.

From 1979 to 1996, he was a faculty of Ibaraki University, Japan (the final position was a professor and chairperson of the Information and System Sciences Major).

Since 1996, he was a Professor of Waseda University, Department of Computer Science and Engineering. From 2011 to 2013, he was the director of the Media Network Center of Waseda University. At the 2011 Tōhoku earthquake and tsunami of March 11, 2011, he was in charge of the safety inquiry of 65,000 students, staffs and faculties.

Since 2017, Matsuyama is a Professor Emeritus and an Honorary Researcher of the Research Institute of Science and Engineering of Waseda University. Since 2018, he serves as an acting president of the Waseda Electrical Engineering Society.

== Work ==
Matsuyama’s works on machine learning and human-aware information processing have dual foundations. Studies on the competitive learning (vector quantization) for his Ph.D. at Stanford University brought about his succeeding works on machine learning contributions. Studies on stochastic spiking neurons for his Dr. Engineering at Waseda University set off applications of biological signals to the machine learning. Thus, his works can be grouped reflecting these dual foundations.

Statistical machine learning algorithms: The use of the alpha-logarithmic likelihood ratio in learning cycles generated the alpha-EM algorithm (alpha-Expectation maximization algorithm). Because the alpha-logarithm includes the usual logarithm, the alpha-EM algorithm contains the EM-algorithm (more precisely, the log-EM algorithm). The merit of the speedup by the alpha-EM over the log-EM is due to the ability to utilize the past information. Such a usage of the messages from the past brought about the alpha-HMM estimation algorithm (alpha-hidden Markov model estimation algorithm) that is a generalized and faster version of the hidden Markov model estimation algorithm (HMM estimation algorithm).

Competitive learning on empirical data: Starting from the speech compression studies at Stanford, Matsuyama developed generalized competitive learning algorithms; the harmonic competition and the multiple descent cost competition. The former realizes the multiple-object optimization. The latter admits deformable centroids. Both algorithms generalize the batch-mode vector quantization (simply called, vector quantization) and the successive-mode vector quantization (or, called learning vector quantization).

A hierarchy from the alpha-EM to the vector quantization: Matsuyama contributed to generate and identify the hierarchy of the above algorithms.

- Alpha-EM ⊃ log-EM ⊃ basic competitive learning (vector quantization, VQ; or clustering).

On the class of the vector quantization and competitive learning, he contributed to generate and identify the hierarchy of VQs.

- VQ ⇔ {batch mode VQ, and learning VQ} ⊂ {harmonic competition} ⊂ {multiple descent cost competition}.

Applications to Human-aware information processing: The dual foundations of his led to the applications to huma-aware information processing.

1. Retrieval systems for similar images and videos.
2. Bipedal humanoid operations via invasive and noninvasive brain signals as well as gestures.
3. Continuous authentication of uses by brain signals.
4. Self-organization and emotional feature injection based on the competitive learning.
5. Decomposition of DNA sequences by the independent component analysis (US Patent: US 8,244,474 B2).
6. Data compression of speech signals by the competitive learning.

The above theories and applications work as contributions to IoCT (Internet of Collaborative Things) and IoXT (http://www.asc-events.org/ASC17/Workshop.php).

== Awards and honors ==
- 2016: e-Teaching Award of Waseda University
- 2015: Best Textbook Award by the Japanese Society of Information Processing
- 2014: Fellow of the Japanese Society of Information Processing
- 2013: IEEE Life Fellow
- 2008: Y. Dote Memorial Best Paper Award of CSTST 2008 from ACM and IEEE
- 2006: LSI Intellectual Property Design Award from the LSI IP Committee
- 2004: Best Paper Award for Application Oriented Research from Asia Pacific Neural Network Assembly
- 2002: Fellow Award from the Institute of Electronics, Information and Communication Engineers.
- 2001: Telecommunication System Major Award of the Telecommunications Advancement Foundation
- 2001: Outstanding Paper Award of IEEE Transactions on Neural Networks
- 1998: Fellow Award from IEEE for contributions to learning algorithms with competition.
- 1992: Best Paper Award from the Institute of Electronics, Information and Communication Engineers
- 1989: Telecommunication System Promotion Award of the Telecommunications Advancement Foundation
