= Pamela Cosman =

Professor of Electrical and Computer Engineering

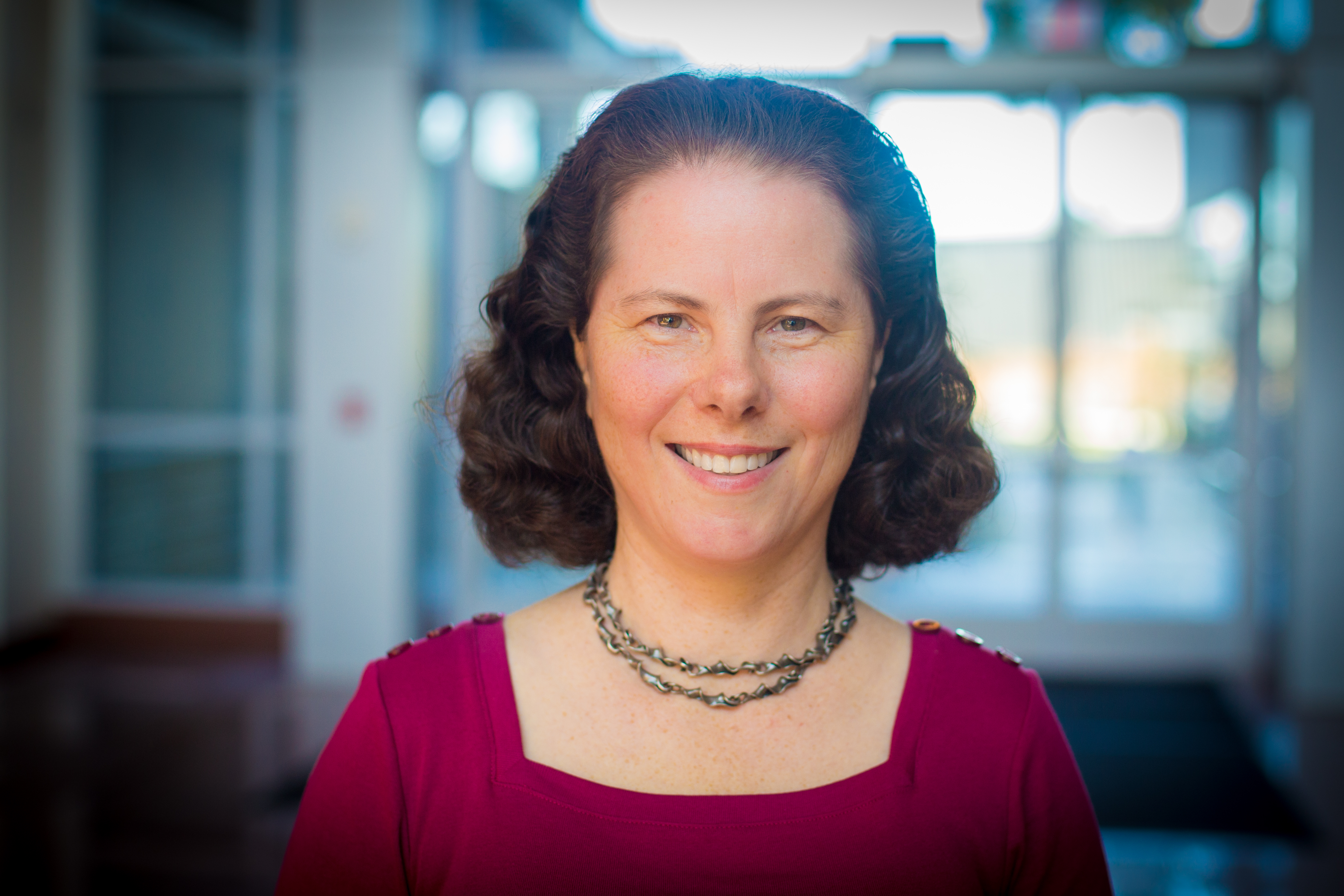
- Education: California Institute of Technology (B.S.) Stanford University (Ph.D.) Stanford University (Postdoctoral fellow) University of Minnesota (Postdoctoral fellow)
- Known for: Video processing and wireless communications, assessment of gaze behavior in children with autism, computer vision for biological application
- Children: 4
- Awards: UC San Diego Affirmative Action and Diversity Award (2016), Athena Pinnacle Award (2017), Diversity Award of the Electrical and Computer Engineering Department Heads Association (2018)
- Scientific career
- Fields: Electrical and Computer Engineering
- Workplaces: University of California San Diego - Professor
- Doctoral advisor: Dr. Bob Gray

Pamela Cosman is a professor of Electrical and Computer Engineering at the University of California, San Diego. She has conducted a pioneering research on the quality of compressed images for application in medical diagnostic imaging. At UCSD, Cosman currently researches ways to improve wireless video transmission.

== Early life and education ==
Pamela C. Cosman obtained her B.Sc. with Honors in Electrical Engineering from the California Institute of Technology in 1987, and her Ph.D. in Electrical Engineering from Stanford University in 1993 with doctoral advisor Dr. Bob Gray.

== Career and research ==
Following an NSF postdoctoral fellowship at Stanford and at the University of Minnesota (1993–1995), she joined the Department of Electrical and Computer Engineering at the University of California, San Diego. Currently, Dr. Cosman is a professor at the University of California, San Diego. Her lab conducts research on video compression in an effort to minimize losses during wireless transmissions.

Cosman simultaneously conducts sociology research on interruptions and introductions during job talks to explore the bias that exists in the hiring process for computer science and engineering faculty. Cosman is also the Faculty Equity Advisor at UCSD's Jacobs School of Engineering where she conducts unconscious bias training for the faculty search committees. The effects of Cosman's course were evident in the nearly 20% increase in female faculty hired between 2013 and 2018. Cosman's efforts were recognized when she won a state grant for enhancing diversity in her department in 2016 as well as the Diversity Award at the ECEDHA Annual Conference and ECExpo in 2019. Cosman is also the author of a children's novel called The Secret Code Menace, which uses a narrative about two siblings to keep readers aged 9–12 engaged as it introduces concepts in coding theory like error correction code.

== Awards and recognition ==
- Inaugural holder of the Dr. John and Felia Proakis Chancellor Faculty Fellowship
- 2018 National Diversity Awards from ECEDHA (Electrical and Computer Engineering Department Heads Association)
- 2017 Athena Pinnacle Award - Outstanding Educator
- 2016 UC San Diego Equal Opportunity/Affirmative Action and Diversity Award
- 2008 Fellow of the IEEE
- 1997-1998 Powell Faculty Fellowship

== Selected publications ==
Publications include:

- Song Q, Cosman PC. Luminance Enhancement and Detail Preservation of Images and Videos Adapted to Ambient Illumination. IEEE Trans Image Process. 2018 Oct; 27(10):4901-4915. PMID 29969400.
- Peng YT, Cao K, Cosman PC. Generalization of the Dark Channel Prior for Single Image Restoration. IEEE Trans Image Process. 2018 Jun; 27(6):2856-2868. PMID 29570087.
- Peng YT, Cosman PC. Underwater Image Restoration Based on Image Blurriness and Light Absorption. IEEE Trans Image Process. 2017 Apr; 26(4):1579-1594. PMID 28182556.
- S. Guo, E. Ho, Y. Zhang, Q. Chen, V. Meng, J. Cao, S. Wu, L. Chukoskie and P.C. Cosman, "Using Face and Object Detection to Quantify Looks During Social Interactions," IEEE International Sympoiusm on Biomedical Imaging (ISBI), April 2018.
- K. Cao, Y.-T. Peng, and P.C. Cosman, "Underwater Image Restoration using Deep Networks to Estimate Background Light and Scene Depth," IEEE Southwest Sympoiusm on Image Analysis and Interpretation (SSIAI), April 2018.
- B.A. Myers, E. Knaplus-Soran, D.C. Llewellyn, A. Delaney, S. Cunningham, P. Cosman, T.D. Ennis, and K. Pitts, "Redshirt in Engineering: A model for improving equity and inclusion," 2018 CoNECD – The Collaborative Network for Engineering and Computing Diversity Conference, Crystal City, April 2018
- E.A. Riskin, J. Milford, J. Callahan, P. Cosman, et al., "The redshirt in engineering consortium: Progress and early insights," Proc. of the 125th ASEE Annual Conference and Exposition, Salt Lake City, June 2018
- E. Knaplus-Soran, A. Delaney, K.C. Tetrick, S. Cunningham, P. Cosman, et al., "Work in Progress: Institutional Context and the Implementation of the Redshirt in Engineering Model at Six Universities," Proc. of the 125th ASEE Annual Conference and Exposition, Salt Lake City, June 2018
- F. Li, Y. Mei, Z. Liu, and P.C. Cosman, "Scene-Aware Soccer Video QoE Assessment- A Compressed-Domain Approach," IEEE International Conference on Multimedia and Expo, July 2018.
- Z. Ye, R. Hegazy, W. Zhou, P.C. Cosman, and L. Milstein, "Joint Energy Optimization of Video Encoding and Transmission," Picture Coding Symposium, PCS 2018.
- B. Luo, Q. Peng, P.C. Cosman, and L. Milstein, "Robustness of Deep Modulation Recognition under AWGN and Rician Fading," 52nd Asilomar Conference on Signals, Systems and Computers, 2018.
- K. Cao, Y. Xu, and P.C. Cosman, "Patch-Aware Averaging Filter for Scaling in Point Cloud Compression," 2018 IEEE GlobalSIP.
- K. Wu, P.C. Cosman, and L. Milstein, "Joint Partial-time Partial-band Jamming of a Multicarrier DS-CDMA System in a Fading Environment," 2018 IEEE GlobalSIP.
- P. Venuprasad, T. Dobhal, A. Paul, T.N.M. Nugyen, A. Gilman, P. Cosman, and L. Chukoskie, "Characterizing Joint Attention Behavior during Real World Interactions using Automated Object and Gaze Detection," 2019 ACM Symposium on Eye Tracking Research & Applications, June 2019.
- P. Zhang, L. Su, L. Li, B. Bao, P. Cosman, G. Li and Q. Huang, "Training Efficient Saliency Prediction Models with Knowledge Distillation," 2019 ACM Multimedia.
- B. Zhang, P.C. Cosman, and L. Milstein, "Energy Optimization for Incremental Redundancy Hybrid-ARQ," 53rd Asilomar Conference on Signals, Systems and Computers, 2019.
- L. Li, Q. Peng, P.C. Cosman, and L. Milstein, "Deep Modulation Recognition in an Unknown Environment," 53rd Asilomar Conference on Signals, Systems and Computers, 2019.
- Z. Ye, A. Gilman, Q. Peng, K. Levick, P.C. Cosman, and L. Milstein, "Comparison of Neural Network Architectures for Spectrum Sensing," IEEE GLOBECOM 2019 Workshop on Advancements in Spectrum Sharing.
- L. Su, P.C. Cosman, Q. Peng, "No-Reference Video Quality Assessment Based on Ensemble of Knowledge and Data-Driven Models," International Conference on Multimedia Modeling, 231–242, MMM 2019.
