= Lawrence Rabiner =

American electrical engineer (born 1943)

Lawrence R. Rabiner
- Born: September 28, 1943 (age 83); Brooklyn, New York
- Education: Massachusetts Institute of Technology (SB, SM, PhD)
- Scientific career
- Fields: Electrical engineering
- Workplaces: Rutgers University; University of California, Santa Barbara
- Doctoral advisor: Kenneth N. Stevens

Lawrence R. Rabiner (born 28 September 1943) is an American electrical engineer. He worked in the fields of digital signal processing and speech processing, in particular in digital signal processing for automatic speech recognition. He worked on systems for AT&T Corporation for speech recognition.

He is a Professor Emeritus of Electrical and Computer Engineering at the University of California, Santa Barbara and Distinguished Professor Emeritus at Rutgers University.

== Education ==
- S.B. in electrical engineering, Massachusetts Institute of Technology, 1964
- S.M. in electrical engineering, Massachusetts Institute of Technology, 1964
- Ph.D. in electrical engineering, Massachusetts Institute of Technology, 1967

== Research interests ==
- Digital signal processing
- Speech processing
- Multimodal user interfaces
- Multimedia communications
- Shared collaboration systems for tele-collaboration

== Life ==
Rabiner was born in Brooklyn, New York, in 1943. During his studies at MIT, he participated in the cooperative program at AT&T Bell Laboratories, during which he worked on digital circuit design and binaural hearing. After obtaining his PhD in 1967, he joined AT&T Bell Laboratories' research division in Murray Hill, NJ as a member of technical staff. He was promoted to supervisor in 1972, department head in 1985, director in 1990, and functional vice-president in 1995. He joined the newly created AT&T Labs - Research in 1996 as director of the Speech and Image Processing Services Research Laboratory. He was promoted vice-president of Research in 1998, succeeding Sandy Fraser, where he managed broad programs in communication, computing, and information sciences. He retired from AT&T in 2002 and joined the department of electrical engineering at Rutgers University, with a joint appointment at the University of California, Santa Barbara.

Rabiner pioneered a range of novel algorithms for digital filtering and digital spectrum analysis. The most well known of these algorithms are the chirp z-transform method (CZT) of spectral analysis, a range of optimal finite impulse response (FIR) digital filter design methods based on linear programming and Chebyshev approximation methods, and a class of decimation/interpolation methods for digital sampling rate conversion. In the area of speech processing, Rabiner has made contributions to the fields of pitch detection, speech synthesis and speech recognition. Rabiner built one of the first digital speech synthesizers that was able to convert arbitrary text to intelligible speech. In the area of speech recognition, Rabiner was a major contributor to the creation of the statistical method of representing speech that is known as hidden Markov modeling (HMM). Rabiner was the first to publish the scaling algorithm for the Forward–Backward method of training of HMM recognizers. His research showed how to successfully implement an HMM system based on either discrete or continuous density parameter distributions. His tutorial paper on HMM is highly cited. Rabiner's research resulted in a series of speech recognition systems that went into deployment by AT&T to enable automation of a range of ‘operator services’ that previously had been carried out using live operators. One such system, called the Voice Recognition Call Processing (VRCP) system, automated a small vocabulary recognition system (5 active words) with word spotting and barge-in capability. It resulted in savings of several hundred millions of dollars annually for AT&T.

== Awards and recognitions ==
- Acoustical Society of America (ASA) Fellow, 1970
- Paper Award of IEEE Group on Audio and Electroacoustics, 1971
- Eta Kappa Nu Outstanding Young Electrical Engineer Award – Honorable Mention, 1972
- ASA Biennial Award, 1974
- IEEE Fellow, 1976
- IEEE ASSP Achievement Award, 1978
- IEEE Emanuel R. Piore Award, 1980 (with Ronald W. Schafer)
- IEEE ASSP Society Award, 1980
- Election to National Academy of Engineering, 1983
- IEEE Centennial Award, 1984
- AT&T Bell Laboratories Fellow, 1989
- Election to National Academy of Sciences, 1990
- Speech Processing Magazine Award of the IEEE, 1994
- AT&T Patent Award, 1995
- AT&T Fellow Award, 1996
- IEEE Millennium Medal, 1999
- IEEE Jack S. Kilby Signal Processing Medal, 1999

== Selected publications ==
- "Digital Speech Processing", B. H. Juang, M. M. Sondhi, and L. R. Rabiner, Encyclopedia of Physical Science and Technology, Third Edition, Volume 4, pp. 485–500, 2002
- Speech and Language Processing for Next-Millennium Communications Services, R. V. Cox, C. A. Kamm, L. R. Rabiner, J. Schroeter, and J. G. Wilpon, Proceedings of the IEEE, Vol. 88, No. 8, pp. 1314–1337, August 2000
- Image and Video Coding-Emerging Standards and Beyond, B. G. Haskell, P. G. Howard, Y. A. LeCun, A. Puri, J. Ostermann, M. R. Civanlar, L. R. Rabiner, L. Bottou, and P. Haffner, IEEE Transactions on Circuits and Systems for Video Technology, Vol. 8, No. 7, pp. 814–837, November 1998
- On the Applications of Multimedia Processing to Communications, R. V. Cox, B. G. Haskell, Y. LeCun, B. Shahraray, and L. R. Rabiner, Proceedings of the IEEE, Vol. 86, No. 5, pp. 755–824, May 1998
- "The Role of Speech Processing in Human-Computer Intelligent Communication", C. A. Kamm, M. Walker, and L. R. Rabiner, Speech Communication Vol. 23, pp. 263–278, 1997
- Fundamentals of Speech Recognition, L. R. Rabiner and B. H. Juang, Prentice-Hall, ISBN 0130151572, 1993
