= Bhuvana Ramabhadran =

Speech recognition researcher

Bhuvana Ramabhadran is a speech recognition researcher for Google, and a former distinguished researcher at the IBM T. J. Watson Research Center.

Ramabhadran earned a Ph.D. in electrical engineering in 1995 from the University of Houston. Her dissertation, An object-oriented expert system for the identification of foci of epileptiform activity, was supervised by John R. Glover. She joined IBM in the same year.

In 2017, Ramabhadran was elected as an IEEE Fellow "for contributions to speech recognition and language processing", and a Fellow of the International Speech Communication Association, "for contributions to the fields of speech recognition research and applications".
