= Nemesis Go Master =

- Developer: Toyogo
- Publisher: Toyogo
- Platforms: Mac, MS-DOS, Windows
- Release: 1994

Nemesis Go Master is a video game published in 1994 by Toyogo for MS-DOS, Windows, and Mac.

== Gameplay ==
NEMESIS Go Master is a game in which an Icons Window displays functions of the game of Go. The game offers optional advice for novice players, as well as additional tutor and tactical modules. It uses tactics taken from game programmer Bruce Wilcox's book Instant Go. It comes with a supplementary program that allows players to study over 1000 opening sequences.

== Reception ==
Timothy J. Trimble reviewed the game for Computer Gaming World, and stated that "Although gamers who require sterling graphics to draw them into a game may be disappointed, Nemesis GO Master has plenty to offer in the way of instruction, competition and satisfaction. Overall, Nemesis GO Master is a good program for both the beginning and intermediate GO player."

The reviewer for PC World said that Nemesis Go Master would be "an excellent introduction" to Go: "Your computer opponent will win but won't gloat."

Charles Seiter reviewed Nemesis Go Master 3.0 for Macworld and called it "the leading go game for the Macintosh" and "an improvement over learning the game from books or from all but the most patient humans".

Game Player's PC Buyer's Guide complimented its "elegant, option-loaded, highly flexible introduction to the game".
