= Biing-Hwang Juang =

American engineer

Biing-Hwang "Fred" Juang (Chinese name: 莊炳湟) is a communication and information scientist, best known for his work in speech coding, speech recognition and acoustic signal processing. He joined Georgia Institute of Technology in 2002 as Motorola Foundation Chair Professor in the School of Electrical & Computer Engineering.

He is a former editor-in-chief of the IEEE Transactions on Speech and Audio Processing (1996–2002). He is a Fellow of the IEEE (since 1991) and has received the IEEE James L. Flanagan Speech and Audio Processing Award (2014), and IEEE Jack S. Kilby Signal Processing Medal (2026). In 2004, he was elected a member of the National Academy of Engineering for contributions to speech coding and speech recognition.

== Life and career ==
He received his university education at University of California, Santa Barbara (UCSB). He did research on vocal tract modeling at Speech Communications Research Laboratory (SCRL) with Hisashi Wakita, and then joined Signal Technology, Inc. (STI) in 1979, while still a Ph.D. student at UCSB (under advisor A. H. Gray, Jr.), to work on a number of U.S. government-sponsored research projects. In 1982, he moved to the U.S. east coast to join Bell Laboratories. His work includes development of vector quantization for voice applications, voice coders at extremely low bit rates (800 bit/s and 300 bit/s), robust vocoders for satellite communications, fundamental algorithms in signal modeling for automatic speech recognition, hidden Markov models, segmental clustering algorithms, discriminative methods in pattern recognition and machine learning, stereo- and multi-phonic teleconferencing, and a number of voice-enabled interactive communication services. Aside from various algorithms that are in widespread use today, he is also credited with the conceptual breakthrough of direct error minimization for pattern recognition, which substantially augments the century-old methodology of Thomas Bayes' distribution estimation approach. He was Director of Acoustics and Speech Research at Bell Labs in late 1990s. He joined Georgia Tech in 2002.

== Awards and recognitions ==
- IEEE Jack S. Kilby Signal Processing Medal, 2026
- Distinguished Alumni Award, National Taiwan University, November 2020
- Research Excellence Award, The Pan Wen Yuan Foundation, 2017
- IEEE James L. Flanagan Speech and Audio Processing Award, 2014
- Charter Fellow, National Academy of Inventors, 2013
- Outstanding Technical Achievement Award, Chinese Institute of Engineers, 2007
- Elected Academician, Academia Sinica, 2006
- Elected Member, National Academy of Engineering (NAE), 2004
- Third Millennium Medal, IEEE, 2000, for contributions to the field of speech processing and communications
- Bell Labs Fellow, 1999
- Distinguished Lecturer, IEEE Signal Processing Society, 1999
- Technical Achievement Award, IEEE Signal Processing Society, 1998
- Editor-in-Chief, IEEE Transactions on Speech and Audio Processing, 1996–2002
- Fellow, IEEE, 1991

== Selected publications ==
- "Digital Speech Processing", B. H. Juang, M. M. Sondhi, and L. R. Rabiner, Encyclopedia of Physical Science and Technology, Third Edition, Volume 4, pp. 485–500, 2002.
- "Hidden Markov Models for Speech Recognition", B. H. Juang and L. R. Rabiner, Technometrics, vol. 33, issue 3, pp. 251–272, March 1991.
