= Michelle Effros =

Professor of electrical engineering

- Born: 1967 (age 58–59); New York City, U.S.
- Education: Stanford University
- Scientific career
- Workplaces: Caltech
- Doctoral advisor: Robert M. Gray

Michelle Effros is the George Van Osdol Professor of Electrical Engineering at the California Institute of Technology. She has made significant contributions to data compression.

== Early life and education ==
Effros earned her bachelor's degree at Stanford University in 1989. She was awarded the Stanford University Frederick Emmons Terman Engineering Scholastic Award for excellence in engineering. She remained there for her graduate studies, earning a master's degree in 1990 and a PhD in 1994. She worked under the supervision of Robert M. Gray. She spent 1988 and 1989 at Hughes Aircraft Company, studying modulation schemes and future space technology. Her graduate studies were supported by the Hughes Aircraft Company, National Science Foundation and AT&T. She worked on lossy and lossless compression and source coding.

== Research ==
She moved to California Institute of Technology in 1994 as an assistant professor. Here she founded the Caltech Data Compression Lab, where she continued her work in source coding and point-to-point networks. In the Data Compression Lab, Effros investigates network source coding. Her work was initially supported by a National Science Foundation CAREER Award. She established ways to calculate the capacity of large communication networks, building computational tools to bound them. She has written about the rise of wireless networks and their independence of fix infrastructure. Working with Qian Zhao, Effros developed a new technique to compress data using a multiple access source code. In 2001 Effros was selected as one of Massachusetts Institute of Technology's Top Innovators Under 35. She introduced an approach that used random linear network coding to transmit and compress information. They went on to show the benefits of this technique over routing-based approaches.

Effros was awarded the IEEE Communications Society & Information Theory Society Joint Paper Award in 2009 for her work on linear network coding. In 2015 she served as President of the Institute of Electrical and Electronics Engineers Information Theory Society. She delivered a talk at the Claude Shannon Centennial Symposium, discussing communication theory and reliability.
