= Eve Riskin =

American electrical engineer

Eve Ann Riskin is an American electrical engineer and academic administrator, the dean for undergraduate education at the Stevens Institute of Technology. Her research has concerned image compression and video compression, focusing in particular on the video transmission of American Sign Language over low-bandwidth networks.

== Education and career ==
Riskin is originally from the Lawrenceville section of Lawrence Township, Mercer County, New Jersey. After starting in computer science, she switched to electrical engineering as an undergraduate at the Massachusetts Institute of Technology, and graduated in 1984. She then went to Stanford University for graduate study, earning two master's degrees in electrical engineering and operations research in 1985 and 1986 respectively, and completing her Ph.D. in electrical engineering in 1990. Her doctoral dissertation, Variable Rate Vector Quantization of Images, was supervised by Robert M. Gray.

She became an assistant professor of electrical engineering at the University of Washington in 1990. At the University of Washington, she became associate dean of engineering in 2005, led the ADVANCE Center for Institutional Change, and founded the Washington STate Academic RedShirt (STARS) program for disadvantaged students. She moved to the Stevens Institute of Technology as dean for undergraduate education and professor of electrical engineering in 2022.

== Recognition ==
Riskin was elected as an IEEE Fellow in 2009, "for contributions to variable-rate image and video compression and to engineering education". She was a 2020 recipient of the Presidential Award for Excellence in Science, Mathematics, and Engineering Mentoring.
