= DARPA Global autonomous language exploitation program =

DARPA-funded program

The Global Autonomous Language Exploitation (GALE) program was funded by DARPA starting in 2005 to develop technologies for automatic information extraction from multilingual newscasts, documents and other forms of communication. The program encompassed three main challenges: automatic speech recognition, machine translation, and information retrieval. The focus of the program was on recognizing speech in Mandarin and Arabic and translating it to English.

Teams led by IBM, BBN (led by John Makhoul), and SRI participated in the program. Both ICSI and University of Washington participated in the program under the SRI team.

It was supported by the Linguistic Data Consortium, which developed integrated linguistic resources and related infrastructure to support language exploitation technologies in GALE.
