= Walter A. Rosenblith =

- Born: September 21, 1913; Vienna, Austria
- Died: May 1, 2002 (aged 88); Miami Beach, Florida, U.S.
- Citizenship: United States
- Education: University of Bordeaux - 1936; Ecole Superieure d'Electricite, Paris - 1937
- Known for: Psychoacoustics, Provost of MIT
- Scientific career
- Fields: Psychoacoustics
- Workplaces: MIT

Walter A. Rosenblith (September 21, 1913 – May 1, 2002) was a biophysicist and Institute Professor at the Massachusetts Institute of Technology. He was elected to all three National Academies (National Academy of Sciences, the National Academy of Engineering and the Institute of Medicine).

From 1943 to 1947 Rosenblith was a member of the physics faculty at the South Dakota School of Mines and Technology in Rapid City, South Dakota. In 1947, he became a research fellow at Harvard University's Psycho-Acoustic Laboratory. He joined the MIT faculty in 1951 as an associate professor of communications biophysics in the Department of Electrical Engineering, was tenured in 1957, chair of the faculty from 1967 to 1969, and named Institute Professor in 1975. Rosenblith was MIT's associate provost from 1969 to 1971 and provost from 1971 to 1980. He helped to found the Whitaker College, Harvard-MIT Joint Center for Urban Studies, as well as the Program in Science, Technology, and Society.

He was a pioneer in using computers to emulate the behavior of the human brain. He was the editor of.
