= Sheila Hemami =

American electrical engineer and entrepreneur

Sheila Susann Hemami is an American electrical engineer and entrepreneur, the Senior Director for Growth Initiatives at Triple Ring Technologies, a tech incubator and co-development company. Formerly a professor at Cornell University and Northeastern University, her academic expertise is in signal processing.

== Education and career ==
Hemami majored in electrical engineering at the University of Michigan, graduating in 1990. She then went to Stanford University for graduate study in electrical engineering, earned a master's degree in 1992, and completed her Ph.D. in 1994. Her doctoral dissertation, Reconstruction of Compressed Images and Video for Lossy Packet Networks, was supervised by Robert M. Gray.

After working as a researcher at Hewlett Packard Labs, she joined the Cornell University School of Electrical Engineering in 1995, and was Kodak Term Assistant Professor there from 1996 to 1999. Cornell promoted her to full professor in 2006, as the first woman in the university's School of Electrical Engineering to receive this level of promotion. She chaired the IEEE Image and Multidimensional Signal Processing Technical Committee in 2006 and 2007, and was editor-in-chief of IEEE Transactions on Multimedia from 2008 to 2010. She moved to Northeastern University in Boston in 2013, as chair of its Department of Electrical Engineering.

In 2016, Hemami moved to non-profit technology developer Draper Laboratory as Director of Strategic Technical Opportunities, changing her focus to global challenges involving the environment and sustainability. She moved again to her present position at Triple Ring Technologies in 2021.

== Recognition ==
In 2000, Hemami was the recipient of the Eta Kappa Nu C. Holmes MacDonald Outstanding Teaching Award, an annual national award for electrical and computer engineering education.

She was named an IEEE Fellow in 2009, "for contributions to robust and perceptual image and video communications".
