= Robert M. Gray =

American information theorist and professor

- Robert M. Gray (2008)
- Born: November 1, 1943 (age 82); San Diego, California
- Education: University of Southern California
- Known for: Vector quantization
- Awards: IEEE Centennial Medal (1984); Member of the National Academy of Engineering (2007); Claude E. Shannon Award (2008)
- Scientific career
- Fields: Electrical engineering
- Workplaces: Stanford University
- Doctoral advisor: Robert A. Scholtz; Irwin M. Jacobs
- Doctoral students: Pamela Cosman; Michelle Effros; Sheila Hemami; Jia Li; Yasuo Matsuyama; Mari Ostendorf; Eve Riskin

Robert M. Gray (born November 1, 1943) is an American information theorist, and the Alcatel-Lucent Professor of Electrical Engineering at Stanford University in Palo Alto, California. He is best known for his contributions to quantization and compression, particularly the development of vector quantization.

== Awards ==
In 1980, Gray was elevated to the grade of IEEE fellow for contribution to information and communication theory. Gray received the 2008 Claude E. Shannon Award from the IEEE Information Theory Society, for his fundamental contributions to information theory, particularly in the area of quantization theory. He was also the recipient of the 2008 IEEE Jack S. Kilby Signal Processing Medal, the 1998 Golden Jubilee Award for Technological Innovation from the IEEE Information Theory Society, the 1993 IEEE Signal Processing Society Award, and the 1984 IEEE Centennial Medal. Gray received the 2002 Presidential Award for Excellence in Science, Mathematics and Engineering Mentoring from the National Science Foundation. In 2020 he received both, The Okawa Prize for his seminal research in information coding theory and data compression, and enormous contributions to the promotion of diversity in engineering education, and IEEE Aaron D. Wyner Distinguished Service Award for his outstanding leadership in, and providing long standing, exceptional service, to the Information Theory community.

Gray was elected as a member into the National Academy of Engineering in 2007 for contributions to information theory and data compression.

He received the IEEE Third Millennium Medal in 2000.

== Early life ==
Born in 1943 in San Diego, Gray grew up in Coronado, California. He was the third child in a family of five children.

Gray followed his two older brothers to the Massachusetts Institute of Technology. He earned his B.S. and M.S. in Electrical Engineering from MIT, obtaining his M.S. in 1966. Gray earned his Ph.D. in Electrical Engineering from University of Southern California in 1969; his Ph.D. adviser was Robert A. Scholtz.

He began his career at the US Naval Ordnance Laboratory.

== Books ==
Gray has written or co-authored a number of technical texts, including:

- Toeplitz and Circulant Matrices (1971, revised 2006)
- Probability, Random Processes and Ergodic Properties (1988, revised 2007)
- Introduction to Statistical Signal Processing (1986, revised 2007)
- Entropy and Information Theory (1991, revised 2007)
- Source Coding Theory (1990)
- Vector Quantization and Signal Compression (1992)

Gray is also an amateur historian and has collected together some historical letters from diplomats into books:

- Amy Heard: Letters from the Gilded Age (2005)
- Max&Max (2005)

== Notable professional service ==
Gray is the founding editor of Foundations and Trends in Signal Processing. He has also been editor-in-chief of both that publication and the IEEE Trans. on Information Theory (1981–1983), and served on the IEEE Information Theory Society's board of governors (1974–1980, 1984–1987) and IEEE Signal Processing Society's board of governors (1999–2001).
