= Keiichi Tokuda =

Keiichi Tokuda (徳田 恵一, Tokuda Keiichi), graduate from and professor at the Nagoya Institute of Technology from 2004, doctor of engineering granted by Tokyo Institute of Technology and CEO & CTO of Techno-Speech, Inc., was named Fellow of the Institute of Electrical and Electronics Engineers (IEEE) in 2014 for contributions to hidden Markov model-based speech synthesis. He was awarded Medal with Purple Ribbon in 2020.

== Publications ==
- Keiichi Tokuda et al., "Speaker adaptation and the evaluation of speaker similarity in the EMIME speech-to-speech translation project" (with Mirjam Wester, John Dines, Matthew Gibson, Hui Liang, Yi-Jian Wu, Lakshmi Saheer, Simon King, Keiichiro Oura, Philip N. Garner, William Byrne, Yong Guan, Teemu Hirsimäki, Reima Karhila, Mikko Kurimo, Matt Shannon, Sayaka Shiota, Jilei Tian & Junichi Yamagishi)
- Keiichi Tokuda et al., "Personalising speech-to-speech translation: Unsupervised cross-lingual speaker adaptation for HMM-based speech synthesis" Computer Speech & Language Vol. 27, Issue 2, Feb. 2013, pp. 420–437 (with JohnDines, Hui Lian, Lakshmi Saheer, Matthew Gibson, William Byrne, Keiichiro Oura, Junichi Yamagishi, Simon King, Mirjam Westerd, Teemu Hirsimäki, Reima Karhil & Mikko Kurimoe)
- Keiichi Tokuda et al., "THE BLIZZARD MACHINE LEARNING CHALLENGE 2017" 2017 IEEE Automatic Speech Recognition and Understanding Workshop (ASRU), 2017, 331-337 (with Kei Sawada, Simon King & Alan W. Black)
- Keiichi Tokuda et al., "Generalization of Thai Tone Contour in HMM-Based Speech Synthesis" 2017 Asia-Pacific Signal and Information Processing Association Annual Summit and Conference (APSIPA ASC), 2017, 1102-1105 (with Anocha Rugchatjaroen, Sittipong Saychum & Keiichiro Oura)
