= International Speech Communication Association =

Non-profit organization

- Formation: 1988
- Type: Nonprofit
- Website: https://www.isca-speech.org
- Formerly called: European Speech Communication Association

The International Speech Communication Association (ISCA) is a non-profit organization and one of the two main professional associations for speech communication science and technology, the other association being the IEEE Signal Processing Society. It currently has over 2000 members.

== History ==
ISCA, originally entitled the European Speech Communication Association (ESCA), was formed in 1988. ESCA ran the Eurospeech conference from 1989. The ESCA renamed themselves to the International Speech Communication Association (ISCA) in 1999. The ESCA Eurospeech conference and the International Conference on Spoken Language Processing (ICSLP, founded in 1990 by Hiroya Fujisaki) merged between 2000 and 2004 to form the Interspeech conference.

The first ISCA (vs. ESCA) event was the merging of Eurospeech and ICSLP to create ICSLP-Interspeech, held in Beijing, China in 2000. This was followed by Eurospeech-Interspeech, which was held in Aalborg, Denmark in 2001. In 2007, the Eurospeech and ICSLP parts of the conference names were dropped and Interspeech became the sole name of the yearly conference.

== Purpose ==
The purpose of the International Speech Communication Association (ISCA) is to promote the study and application of automatic speech processing, including speech recognition and synthesis, as well as related areas such as speaker recognition and speech compression. The association's activities cover all aspects of speech processing, including computational, linguistic, and theoretical aspects.

== Interspeech conference ==
ISCA organizes the Interspeech conference yearly. The 2024 Interspeech conference had to be moved to Kos Island, Greece due to safety issues in the intended Israel.

Year	Location	Theme	Notes
2000	Beijing, China		1st INTERSPEECH event, held as ICSLP
2001	Aalborg, Denmark		2nd INTERSPEECH event, held as Eurospeech
2002	Denver, Colorado, US		3rd INTERSPEECH event, held as ICSLP
2003	Geneva, Switzerland		4th INTERSPEECH event, held as Eurospeech
2004	Jeju Island, South Korea		
2005	Lisbon, Portugal		
2006	Pittsburgh, Pennsylvania, US		
2007	Antwerp, Belgium		
2008	Brisbane, Australia		
2009	Brighton, United Kingdom		
2010	Makuhari, Chiba, Japan		
2011	Florence, Italy		
2012	Portland, US	Spoken Language Processing and Biomedicine	
2013	Lyon, France	Speech in Life Sciences and Human Societies	
2014	Singapore	Celebrate the Diversity of Spoken Languages	
2015	Dresden, Germany		
2016	San Francisco, US		
2017	Stockholm, Sweden	Situated interaction	
2018	Hyderabad, India		
2019	Graz, Austria	Crossroads of Speech and Language	
2020	Shanghai, China		Fully virtual, due to the COVID-19 pandemic.
2021	Brno, Czechia		Hybrid, due to the COVID-19 pandemic.
2022	Incheon, South Korea	Human and Humanizing Speech Technology	
2023	Dublin, Ireland		
2024	Kos Island, Greece	Speech and Beyond	Moved to Kos Island from Jerusalem, Israel.
2025	Rotterdam, the Netherlands	Fair and Inclusive Speech Science and Technology	
2026	Sydney, Australia		

== ISCA board ==
The ISCA president for 2023-2025 is Odette Scharenborg. The vice president is Bhuvana Ramabhadran and the other members are professionals in the field.

== See also ==
- Natural language processing
- Speech technology
