= Schüssler =

Schüssler or Schuessler or Schüßler is a surname. Notable people with the surname include:

- Benjamin Schüßler (born 1981), German football player
- Brittany Schussler (born 1985), Canadian speed skater
- Elisabeth Schüssler Fiorenza (born 1938), feminist theologian
- Francis Schüssler Fiorenza, Stillman Professor of Roman Catholic Theological Studies at Harvard Divinity School
- Harry Schüssler (born 1957), Swedish chess grandmaster
- Hans Wilhelm Schüßler (1928–2007), German telecommunications engineer and professor
- Jan Wilhelm Schüssler (born 1965), Norwegian show producer
- Karl Schüßler (1924–2023), West German cross country skier
- Otto Schüssler (1905–1982), German communist
- Wilhelm Heinrich Schüßler (1821–1898), German medical doctor who endeavoured to find natural remedies
- Johannes Schussler, German bookprinter 15th century, from Augsburg

== See also ==
- Schüssel
