= Centripetal Catmull–Rom spline =

Variant form of the Catmull-Rom spine

In computer graphics, the centripetal Catmull–Rom spline is a variant form of the Catmull–Rom spline, originally formulated by Edwin Catmull and Raphael Rom, which can be evaluated using a recursive algorithm proposed by Barry and Goldman. It is a type of interpolating spline (a curve that goes through its control points) defined by four control points $\mathbf{P}_0, \mathbf{P}_1, \mathbf{P}_2, \mathbf{P}_3$, with the curve drawn only from $\mathbf{P}_1$ to $\mathbf{P}_2$.

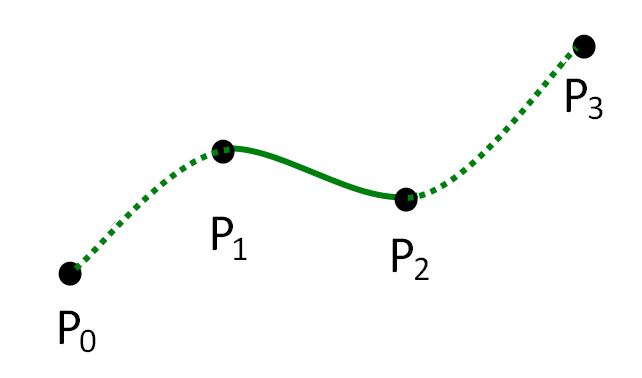
Catmull–Rom spline interpolation with four points

== Definition ==
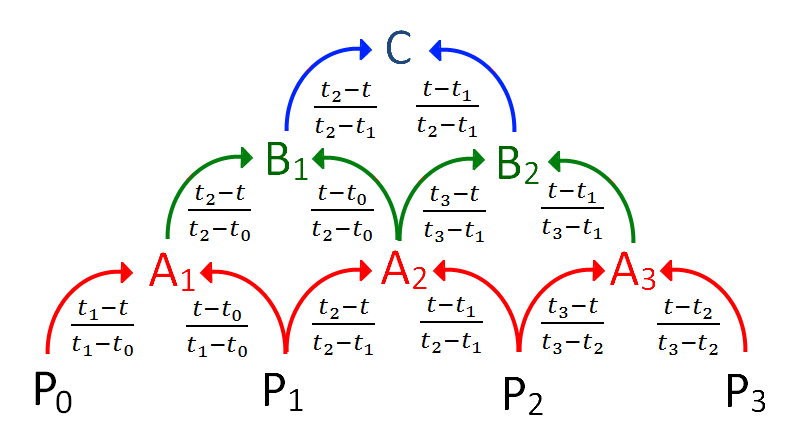
Barry and Goldman's pyramidal formulation

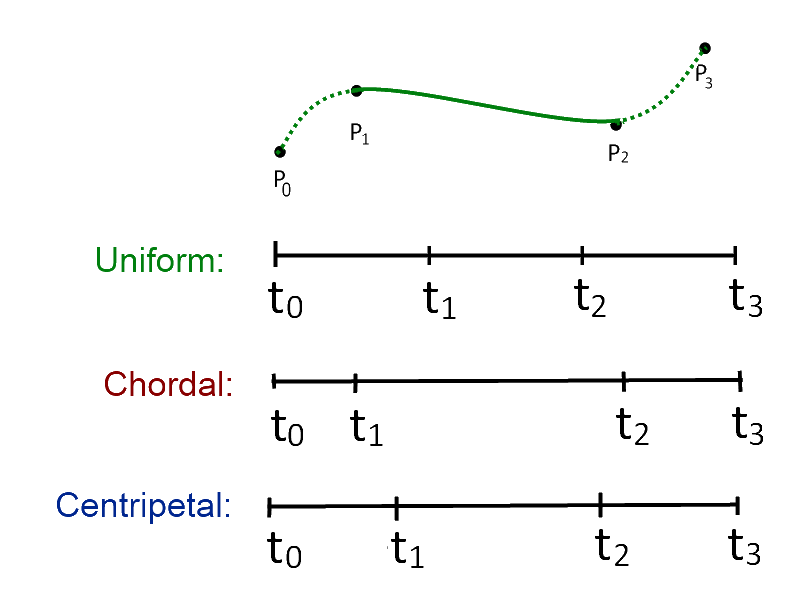
Knot parameterization for the Catmull–Rom algorithm

Let $\mathbf{P}_i = [x_i \quad y_i]^T$ denote a point. For a curve segment $\mathbf{C}$ defined by points $\mathbf{P}_0, \mathbf{P}_1, \mathbf{P}_2, \mathbf{P}_3$ and knot sequence $t_0, t_1, t_2, t_3$, the centripetal Catmull–Rom spline can be produced by:

$$\mathbf{C} = \frac{t_2-t}{t_2-t_1}\mathbf{B}_1+\frac{t-t_1}{t_2-t_1}\mathbf{B}_2$$

where

$$\mathbf{B}_1 = \frac{t_{2}-t}{t_{2}-t_0}\mathbf{A}_1+\frac{t-t_0}{t_{2}-t_0}\mathbf{A}_2$$
$$\mathbf{B}_2 = \frac{t_{3}-t}{t_{3}-t_1}\mathbf{A}_2+\frac{t-t_1}{t_{3}-t_1}\mathbf{A}_3$$
$$\mathbf{A}_1 = \frac{t_{1}-t}{t_{1}-t_0}\mathbf{P}_0+\frac{t-t_0}{t_{1}-t_0}\mathbf{P}_1$$
$$\mathbf{A}_2 = \frac{t_{2}-t}{t_{2}-t_1}\mathbf{P}_1+\frac{t-t_1}{t_{2}-t_1}\mathbf{P}_2$$
$$\mathbf{A}_3 = \frac{t_{3}-t}{t_{3}-t_2}\mathbf{P}_2+\frac{t-t_2}{t_{3}-t_2}\mathbf{P}_3$$

and

$$t_{i+1} = \left[\sqrt{(x_{i+1}-x_i)^2+(y_{i+1}-y_i)^2}\right]^{\alpha} + t_i$$

in which $\alpha$ ranges from 0 to 1 for knot parameterization, and $i = 0,1,2,3$ with $t_0 = 0$. For centripetal Catmull–Rom spline, the value of $\alpha$ is $0.5$. When $\alpha = 0$, the resulting curve is the standard uniform Catmull–Rom spline; when $\alpha = 1$, the result is a chordal Catmull–Rom spline.

Gif animation for uniform, centripetal and chordal parameterization of Catmull–Rom spline depending on the α value

Plugging $t = t_1$ into the spline equations $\mathbf{A}_1, \mathbf{A}_2, \mathbf{A}_3, \mathbf{B}_1, \mathbf{B}_2,$ and $\mathbf{C}$ shows that the value of the spline curve at $t_1$ is $\mathbf{C} = \mathbf{P}_1$. Similarly, substituting $t = t_2$ into the spline equations shows that $\mathbf{C} = \mathbf{P}_2$ at $t_2$. This is true independent of the value of $\alpha$ since the equation for $t_{i+1}$ is not needed to calculate the value of $\mathbf{C}$ at points $t_1$ and $t_2$.

3D centripetal Catmull–Rom spline segment.

The extension to 3D points is simply achieved by considering $\mathbf{P}_i = [x_i \quad y_i \quad z_i]^T$a generic 3D point $\mathbf{P}_i$ and

$$t_{i+1} = \left[\sqrt{(x_{i+1}-x_i)^2+(y_{i+1}-y_i)^2+(z_{i+1}-z_i)^2}\right]^{\alpha} + t_i$$

== Advantages ==
Centripetal Catmull–Rom splines have several desirable mathematical properties compared to the original and the other types of Catmull–Rom formulation. First, loops and self-intersections do not occur within a curve segment. Second, cusps will never occur within a curve segment. Third, it follows the control points more tightly.

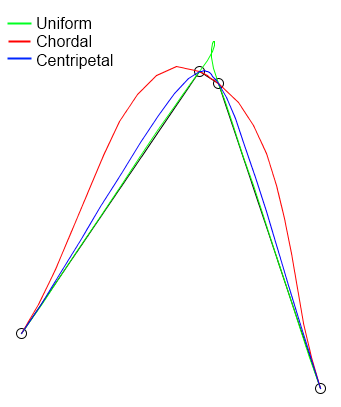
In this figure, there is a self-intersection/loop on the uniform Catmull–Rom spline (green), whereas for chordal Catmull–Rom spline (red), the curve does not follow tightly through the control points.

== Other uses ==
In computer vision, the centripetal Catmull-Rom spline forms the basis of the active spline model for segmentation. The model is based on the active shape model but connects successive points with centripetal Catmull–Rom splines rather than straight lines, reducing the required number of control points. As such, segmentation models trained to produce control points for centripetal Catmull–Rom splines converge more quickly, and the resulting curves are faster to edit than linear polygons or other cubic splines.

== Code example in Python ==
The following is an implementation of the Catmull–Rom spline in Python that produces the plot shown beneath.

import numpy
import matplotlib.pyplot as plt


QUADRUPLE_SIZE: int = 4


def num_segments(point_chain: tuple) -> int:
    # There is 1 segment per 4 points, so we must subtract 3 from the number of points  
    return len(point_chain) - (QUADRUPLE_SIZE - 1)


def flatten(list_of_lists) -> list:
    # E.g. mapping [[1, 2], [3], [4, 5]] to  [1, 2, 3, 4, 5] 
    return [elem for lst in list_of_lists for elem in lst]


def catmull_rom_spline(
    P0: tuple,
    P1: tuple,
    P2: tuple,
    P3: tuple,
    num_points: int,
    alpha: float = 0.5,
):
    """
    Compute the points in the spline segment
    :param P0, P1, P2, and P3: The (x,y) point pairs that define the Catmull-Rom spline
    :param num_points: The number of points to include in the resulting curve segment
    :param alpha: 0.5 for the centripetal spline, 0.0 for the uniform spline, 1.0 for the chordal spline.
    :return: The points
    """

    # Calculate t0 to t4. Then only calculate points between P1 and P2.
    # Reshape linspace so that we can multiply by the points P0 to P3
    # and get a point for each value of t.
    def tj(ti: float, pi: tuple, pj: tuple) -> float:
        xi, yi = pi
        xj, yj = pj
        dx, dy = xj - xi, yj - yi
        l = (dx ** 2 + dy ** 2) ** 0.5
        return ti + l ** alpha

    t0: float = 0.0
    t1: float = tj(t0, P0, P1)
    t2: float = tj(t1, P1, P2)
    t3: float = tj(t2, P2, P3)
    t = numpy.linspace(t1, t2, num_points).reshape(num_points, 1)

    A1 = (t1 - t) / (t1 - t0) * P0 + (t - t0) / (t1 - t0) * P1
    A2 = (t2 - t) / (t2 - t1) * P1 + (t - t1) / (t2 - t1) * P2
    A3 = (t3 - t) / (t3 - t2) * P2 + (t - t2) / (t3 - t2) * P3
    B1 = (t2 - t) / (t2 - t0) * A1 + (t - t0) / (t2 - t0) * A2
    B2 = (t3 - t) / (t3 - t1) * A2 + (t - t1) / (t3 - t1) * A3
    points = (t2 - t) / (t2 - t1) * B1 + (t - t1) / (t2 - t1) * B2
    return points


def catmull_rom_chain(points: tuple, num_points: int) -> list:
    """
    Calculate Catmull-Rom for a sequence of initial points and return the combined curve.
    :param points: Base points from which the quadruples for the algorithm are taken
    :param num_points: The number of points to include in each curve segment
    :return: The chain of all points (points of all segments)
    """
    point_quadruples = (  # Prepare function inputs
        (points[idx_segment_start + d] for d in range(QUADRUPLE_SIZE))
        for idx_segment_start in range(num_segments(points))
    )
    all_splines = (catmull_rom_spline(*pq, num_points) for pq in point_quadruples)
    return flatten(all_splines)


if __name__ == "__main__":
    POINTS: tuple = ((0, 1.5), (2, 2), (3, 1), (4, 0.5), (5, 1), (6, 2), (7, 3))  # Red points
    NUM_POINTS: int = 100  # Density of blue chain points between two red points

    chain_points: list = catmull_rom_chain(POINTS, NUM_POINTS)
    assert len(chain_points) == num_segments(POINTS) * NUM_POINTS  # 400 blue points for this example

    plt.plot(*zip(*chain_points), c="blue")
    plt.plot(*zip(*POINTS), c="red", linestyle="none", marker="o")
    plt.show()

Plot obtained by the Python example code given above

== Code example in Unity C# ==
C# with the Unity game engine.

using UnityEngine;

// a single Catmull–Rom curve
public struct CatmullRomCurve
{
	public Vector2 p0, p1, p2, p3;
	public float alpha;

	public CatmullRomCurve(Vector2 p0, Vector2 p1, Vector2 p2, Vector2 p3, float alpha)
    {
		(this.p0, this.p1, this.p2, this.p3) = (p0, p1, p2, p3);
		this.alpha = alpha;
	}

	// Evaluates a point at the given t-value from 0 to 1
	public Vector2 GetPoint(float t)
    {
		// calculate knots
		const float k0 = 0;
		float k1 = GetKnotInterval(p0, p1);
		float k2 = GetKnotInterval(p1, p2) + k1;
		float k3 = GetKnotInterval(p2, p3) + k2;

		// evaluate the point
		float u = Mathf.LerpUnclamped(k1, k2, t);
		Vector2 A1 = Remap(k0, k1, p0, p1, u);
		Vector2 A2 = Remap(k1, k2, p1, p2, u);
		Vector2 A3 = Remap(k2, k3, p2, p3, u);
		Vector2 B1 = Remap(k0, k2, A1, A2, u);
		Vector2 B2 = Remap(k1, k3, A2, A3, u);
		return Remap(k1, k2, B1, B2, u);
	}

	static Vector2 Remap(float a, float b, Vector2 c, Vector2 d, float u)
    {
		return Vector2.LerpUnclamped(c, d, (u - a) / (b - a));
	}

	float GetKnotInterval(Vector2 a, Vector2 b)
    {
		return Mathf.Pow(Vector2.SqrMagnitude(a - b), 0.5f * alpha);
	}
}

using UnityEngine;

// Draws a Catmull–Rom spline in the scene view,
// along the child objects of the transform of this component
public class CatmullRomSpline : MonoBehaviour
{
	[Range(0, 1)]
    public float alpha = 0.5f;
	int PointCount => transform.childCount;
	int SegmentCount => PointCount - 3;
	Vector2 GetPoint(int i) => transform.GetChild(i).position;

	CatmullRomCurve GetCurve(int i)
    {
		return new CatmullRomCurve(GetPoint(i), GetPoint(i+1), GetPoint(i+2), GetPoint(i+3), alpha);
	}

	void OnDrawGizmos()
    {
		for (int i = 0; i < SegmentCount; i++)
			DrawCurveSegment(GetCurve(i));
	}

	void DrawCurveSegment(CatmullRomCurve curve)
    {
		const int detail = 32;
		Vector2 prev = curve.p1;

		for (int i = 1; i < detail; i++)
        {
			float t = i / (detail - 1f);
			Vector2 pt = curve.GetPoint(t);
			Gizmos.DrawLine(prev, pt);
			prev = pt;
		}
	}
}

== Code example in Unreal C++ ==
float GetT( float t, float alpha, const FVector& p0, const FVector& p1 )
{
    auto d  = p1 - p0;
    float a = d | d; // Dot product
    float b = FMath::Pow( a, alpha*.5f );
    return (b + t);
}

FVector CatmullRom( const FVector& p0, const FVector& p1, const FVector& p2, const FVector& p3, float t /* between 0 and 1 */, float alpha=.5f /* between 0 and 1 */ )
{
    float t0 = 0.0f;
    float t1 = GetT( t0, alpha, p0, p1 );
    float t2 = GetT( t1, alpha, p1, p2 );
    float t3 = GetT( t2, alpha, p2, p3 );
    t = FMath::Lerp( t1, t2, t );
    FVector A1 = ( t1-t )/( t1-t0 )*p0 + ( t-t0 )/( t1-t0 )*p1;
    FVector A2 = ( t2-t )/( t2-t1 )*p1 + ( t-t1 )/( t2-t1 )*p2;
    FVector A3 = ( t3-t )/( t3-t2 )*p2 + ( t-t2 )/( t3-t2 )*p3;
    FVector B1 = ( t2-t )/( t2-t0 )*A1 + ( t-t0 )/( t2-t0 )*A2;
    FVector B2 = ( t3-t )/( t3-t1 )*A2 + ( t-t1 )/( t3-t1 )*A3;
    FVector C  = ( t2-t )/( t2-t1 )*B1 + ( t-t1 )/( t2-t1 )*B2;
    return C;
}

== See also ==
- Catmull–Rom splines
