= Robert B. Ingebretsen =

Robert B. Ingebretsen (30 March 1948 – 2 March 2003) was a pioneer in the development of digital sound.

As a teenager in the 1960s, Ingebretsen built robots and primitive computers that could talk.

As a University of Utah graduate student in the early 1970s, Ingebretsen assisted Dr. Thomas G. Stockham in the development of Stockham's restoration technique for sound and images. This work led to RCA's Caruso-A Legendary Performer that applied Stockham's restoration techniques to acoustic recordings of opera great Enrico Caruso.

Ingebretsen worked with Pixar co-founder Ed Catmull in 1972 to produce one of the first digital films, A Computer Animated Hand.

After graduation in 1975, Ingebretsen joined Stockham at Soundstream Inc., a Utah company where Ingebretsen wrote the software for the first practical digital audio editing system. Soundstream briefly operated an editing studio at a Paramount Pictures studio lot in Los Angeles. Ingebretsen commuted from Utah to Los Angeles, where he supervised the new digital recording for the 1982 re-release of Disney’s Fantasia.

Soundstream dissolved in 1985 and Ingebretsen spent the next 15 years in near anonymity in Salt Lake City, founding a series of small high-tech companies. In 1999 Stockham and Ingebretsen received a Scientific and Engineering Award from the Academy of Motion Picture Arts and Sciences for their pioneering work in digital audio editing.

Ingebretsen also helped pioneer satellite communications technology. In later years, he worked for a Centerville-based startup that develops software for hand-held computers.

On 2 March 2003 Ingebretsen died of heart failure at the age of 54 at his Salt Lake City home.

== See also ==
- Soundstream
- Thomas Stockham
