= Harry L. Van Trees =

American scientist (1930–2022)

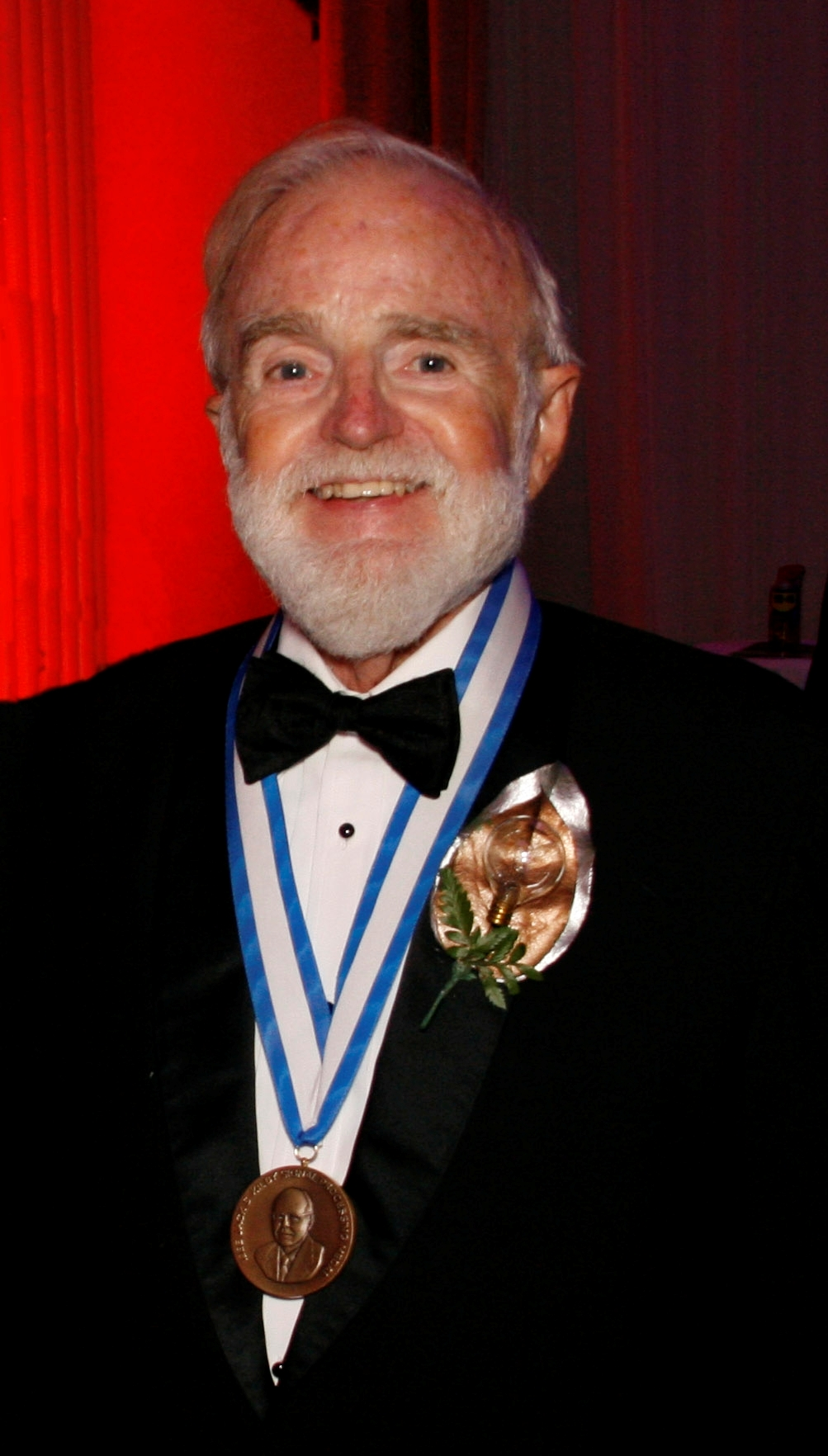
- Van Trees in IEEE Jack S. Kilby Signal Processing Medal award ceremony
- Born: June 27, 1930; Kansas City, Missouri
- Died: December 29, 2022 (aged 92); Ruckersville, Virginia
- Education: West Point; University of Maryland (M.S.); Massachusetts Institute of Technology (Sc.D)
- Spouse: Diane Enright (m. 1953)
- Children: 7
- Awards: Elected to the National Academy of Engineering (of the USA) (2015); IEEE Jack S. Kilby Signal Processing Medal (2015); IEEE Fellow
- Scientific career
- Fields: Electrical engineering, radar, sonar, and signal processing.
- Workplaces: U.S. Air Force; Office of the Secretary of Defense; George Mason University
- Thesis: Synthesis of Optimum Nonlinear Control Systems
- Doctoral advisor: Yuk-Wing Lee

Harry Leslie Van Trees (June 27, 1930 – December 29, 2022) was an American scientist specializing in radar, sonar, communications and signal processing.

== Academic career ==
Harry Leslie Van Trees was born in Kansas City, Missouri on June 27, 1930. He attended West Point, where he graduated first in his class in 1952.

After Van Trees served in the Army, he received a Master of Science in Electrical Engineering from the University of Maryland. He then attended the Massachusetts Institute of Technology (MIT) and received his Sc.D. After graduating, Van Trees joined the MIT faculty as a part of the Electrical Engineering Department.

== Professional contributions ==
While working at Massachusetts Institute of Technology (MIT) during 1968-1971, Van Trees published a three-volume series of textbooks on the detection, estimation, and modulation theory. Van Trees' theory provided a "unified approach to communications, radar, and sonar."

In addition to academic work, Van Trees has also assisted with the implementation of theory into practice in several Department of Defense positions. Van Trees was initially on loan to the government by MIT, he then ended up staying for a number of projects. Van Trees was the Chief Scientist of the U.S. Air Force. He also served as the Principal Deputy Assistant Secretary of Defense (C3I). Additionally, Van Trees was the Assistant Secretary of Defense for Networks and Information Integration; Command, Control, Communications and Intelligence (C3I). From 1982-1988, Van Trees ran the Eastern Operations of M/A-Com Linkabit, a company founded by Irwin M. Jacobs and Andrew Viterbi. The M/A-Com division was sold to Science Applications International Corporation (SAIC) in 1988.

In 1987, Van Trees joined George Mason University (GMU) as a Distinguished Professor of Information Technology, and Electrical and Systems Engineering. Van Trees was also the founding director of Mason's Center of Excellence in Command, Control, Communications and Intelligence (C3I). In 2002, Van Trees published the fourth volume of his textbook titled Optimum Array Processing. This textbook provided a more comprehensive look at optimum array processing. In 2013, Van Trees worked with Dr. Kristine L. Bell and Dr. Zhi Tian, both of GMU, to publish a second edition of the first volume. This version was revised and expanded.

Van Trees was also the creator of the family of Bayesian bounds. The first bound was published in 1964; and in 2007, Van Trees collaborated with Bell to publish Bayesian Bounds for Parameter Estimation and Nonlinear Filter/Tracking.

Van Trees also worked with two colleagues from M/A-Com and founded CommQuest Technologies Inc. CommQuest was a "developer and supplier of advanced semiconductors for wireless comms." CommQuest was purchased by IBM in 1999. Van Trees and his wife established the Harry and Diane Van Trees Electrical Engineering and Computer Science Endowment at West Point.

== Personal life and death ==
Van Trees was married to Diane Enright on April 25, 1953. They had seven children, 19 grandchildren, and 12 great-grandchildren. He died in Ruckersville, Virginia on December 29, 2022, at the age of 92.

== Awards ==
In 2015, Harry Van Trees was awarded the IEEE Jack S. Kilby Signal Processing Medal. The award is presented for outstanding achievement in signal processing theory, technology, or commerce. Van Trees was inducted into the National Academy of Engineering in 2015.
