= James McClellan =

James McClellan may refer to:

- James H. McClellan, professor of signal processing
- James E. McClellan (1926–2016), American veterinarian and politician
