= James H. McClellan =

American electrical engineer

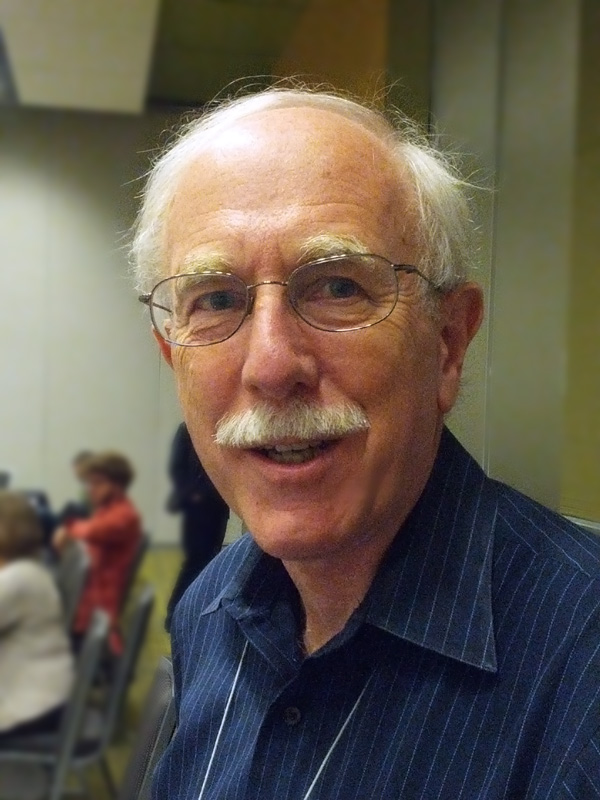
- Born: 5 October 1947 (age 78); Guam
- Citizenship: United States
- Known for: Parks–McClellan filter design algorithm
- Awards: Jack S. Kilby Signal Processing Medal (2004); IEEE James H. Mulligan Jr. Education Medal (2026)

James H. McClellan (born 5 October 1947) is the Byers Professor of Signal Processing at the Georgia Institute of Technology. He is widely known for his creation of the McClellan transform and for his co-authorship of the Parks–McClellan filter design algorithm.

== Early life and education ==
James McClellan was born on October 5, 1947, in Guam. McClellan received his B.S. in Electrical Engineering from Louisiana State University in 1969. He went on to receive an M.S. (1972) and a Ph.D. (1973) from Rice University.

== Career ==
In 1973, he joined the research staff of MIT's Lincoln Laboratory. In 1975, he became a professor at MIT's Electrical Engineering and Computer Science department before leaving to join Schlumberger. Since 1987, he has been at the Georgia Institute of Technology. Prof. McClellan is a Fellow of the IEEE. He received the Acoustics, Speech, and Signal Processing Technical Achievement Award in 1987, the IEEE Signal Processing Society Award in 1996, and the IEEE Jack S. Kilby Signal Processing Medal in 2004 (together with Thomas W. Parks).

== Books ==
- Number Theory in Digital Signal Processing, J. H. McClellan and C. M. Rader, Prentice-Hall, Inc., Englewood Cliffs, N.J., 1979, ISBN 0-8493-7177-5.
- Computer-Based Exercises for Signal Processing Using MATLAB, J. H. McClellan, C. S. Burrus, A. V. Oppenheim, T. W. Parks, R.W. Schafer, H. W. Schuessler, Prentice Hall, 1998, ISBN 0-13-789009-5.
- DSP First: A Multimedia Approach, J. H. McClellan, R. W. Schafer, M. A. Yoder, Upper Saddle River, NJ: Prentice-Hall, Inc., 1998, ISBN 0-13-243171-8. DSP First, 2e, Prentice Hall, 2016, ISBN 978-0-13-601925-1
- Signal Processing First, J. H. McClellan, R.W. Schafer, M. A. Yoder, Upper Saddle River, NJ: Prentice-Hall, Inc., 2003, ISBN 0-13-090999-8.
