= Avideh Zakhor =

Iranian-American electrical engineer

- آویده زاخور
- Born: 1964 (age 61–62); Tehran, Iran
- Education: Caltech (BS); MIT (SM, PhD)
- Awards: Presidential Young Investigator Award (1990); IEEE Fellow (2001); Okawa Prize (2004); Electronic Imaging Scientist of the Year (2018)
- Scientific career
- Fields: Electrical engineering, signal processing, computer vision
- Workplaces: University of California, Berkeley (1988–present)
- Thesis: Reconstruction of multidimensional signals from multiple level threshold crossings (1987)
- Doctoral advisor: Alan V. Oppenheim
- Website: www2.eecs.berkeley.edu/Faculty/Homepages/zakhor.html

Avideh Zakhor (Persian: آویده زاخور, born 1964) is an Iranian-American electrical engineer and Professor Emerita at the University of California, Berkeley, where she formerly held the Qualcomm Chair in Electrical Engineering and Computer Sciences. She is a Fellow of the IEEE, elected in 2001 "for contributions to image and video compression". Her research involves signal processing, video processing including video coding, decoding, and streaming, computer vision, and urban-scale 3D modeling. Zakhor is also an entrepreneur whose startups have been acquired by Mentor Graphics, Google, and a European construction supply company.

== Education and career ==
Zakhor is originally from Tehran, where her father was a businessman, the founder of Iran's first button factory; her interest in engineering stems from a fascination with the machines in his factory. She was a high school exchange student at Atlantic College in Wales when the Iranian Revolution caused the rest of her family to flee Iran, settling in Los Angeles in the late 1970s. After finishing high school in Wales, she studied electrical engineering as an undergraduate at the California Institute of Technology, graduating in 1983. Before falling, the former government of Iran had paid for her schooling in Wales, but its promise of continued funding for university study did not materialize; instead, she obtained student funding from General Motors, supplementing it with Caltech's Henry Ford II Scholar Award. Continuing her studies at the Massachusetts Institute of Technology under a Hertz Fellowship, she earned a master's degree in 1985 and completed her Ph.D. in 1987. She attributes her quick finish to a desire to leave the cold weather of Boston. Her doctoral dissertation, Reconstruction of multidimensional signals from multiple level threshold crossings, was supervised by Alan V. Oppenheim.

She became an assistant professor of electrical engineering at the University of California, Berkeley, in 1988 at the age of 24. She was the first woman electrical engineering professor in the Department of Electrical Engineering and Computer Science, and only the second woman faculty member in the department after computer scientist Susan L. Graham.

While continuing at Berkeley, she co-founded OPC Technology in 1996, a software supplier to the integrated circuit manufacturing industry, which was acquired by Mentor Graphics in 1998 and after further acquisitions became part of Siemens. In 2005, she founded UrbanScan, a company for building 3D city models; it was acquired by Google in 2007, and its technology became an important part of Google Earth. She founded a third company, Indoor Reality, in 2015, focused on 3D mapping and visual documentation of buildings; it was acquired in 2019 by a European construction supply company.

== Awards and recognition ==
Zakhor received the Presidential Young Investigator Award in 1990 and the Office of Naval Research Young Investigator Award in 1992. She was elected as an IEEE Fellow in 2001 "for contributions to image and video compression". She received the Okawa Prize in 2004.

Her work has received multiple best paper awards, including from the IEEE Signal Processing Society (1997 and 2009), the IEEE Circuits and Systems Society (1997 and 1999), the IEEE Solid-State Circuits Society (2008), the IEEE International Conference on Image Processing (1999), and the Packet Video Workshop (2002).

She was named the Electronic Imaging Scientist of the Year at Electronic Imaging 2018, the annual symposium of the Society for Imaging Science and Technology, "for significant contributions to signal processing, including 3D image processing & computer vision; 3D reality capture systems; 3D modeling, mapping and positioning; and image and video compression and communication".

In 2021 and 2022, Zakhor and her team won phases 1 and 2 of the Department of Energy-sponsored E-ROBOT competition for the RoboAttic + ThermaDrone project, which developed robots to improve energy efficiency of building envelopes.

== Personal life ==
Zakhor married Seth Sanders, a fellow MIT student who also became a professor of electrical engineering at Berkeley.
