= Yonina Eldar =

Israeli academic and engineer

- יונינה אלדר
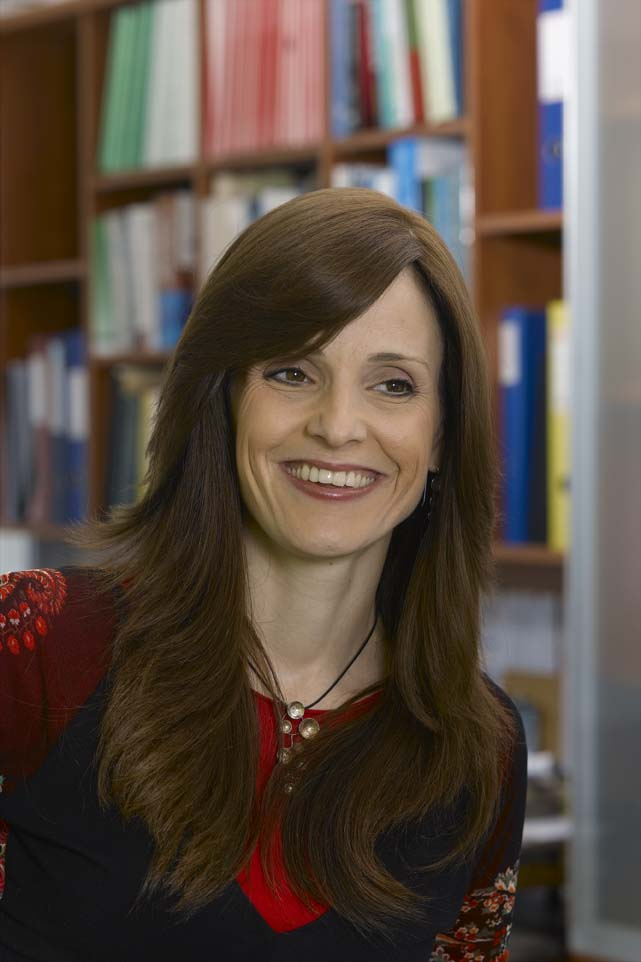
- Eldar in 2012
- Born: 25 January 1973 (age 53); Toronto, Canada
- Education: Tel Aviv University, MIT
- Known for: Sub-Nyquist sampling
- Spouse: Shalomi Eldar (divorced)
- Children: 5
- Awards: Israel Prize for Engineering and Technology (2025)
- Scientific career
- Fields: Electrical engineering Signal processing
- Workplaces: Northeastern University; Weizmann Institute of Science; Technion; MIT; Broad Institute, Duke University; Stanford University
- Thesis: Quantum Signal Processing (2002)
- Doctoral advisor: Alan V. Oppenheim

Yonina Chana Eldar (Hebrew: יונינה חנה אלדר; née Berglas; born 25 January 1973) is a Canadian-born Israeli-American professor of electrical engineering at the Northeastern University, Boston and the Weizmann Institute of Science, known for her pioneering work on sub-Nyquist sampling.

== Early life and education ==
Eldar was born in Toronto, Canada. She is the third daughter of Rabbi Meyer and Vicky Berglas. She moved with her family to Israel in 1979. She received her B.Sc. degrees in physics and electrical engineering both from Tel Aviv University (TAU), Israel, in 1995 and 1996, respectively.

Eldar earned her Ph.D. degree in electrical engineering and computer science from the Massachusetts Institute of Technology (MIT), Cambridge, Massachusetts, in 2002. Eldar authored the thesis Quantum Signal Processing under the supervision of Alan V. Oppenheim. Her postdoctoral research was completed in 2002 at the Digital Signal Processing Group at MIT.

== Career ==
Eldar returned to Israel in 2002 and became a senior lecturer in the Electrical Engineering Department at the Technion, Haifa. In 2005 she became an associate professor at that department, and in 2010, a professor, holding the Edwards Chair in Engineering.

Since 2019, Eldar has been a professor at the Math and Computer Science Department at the Weizmann Institute of Science, Rehovot. In August 2025, she joined the Department of Electrical and Computer Engineering of Northeastern University, Boston.

Eldar is a member of the Israel Academy of Sciences and Humanities, an IEEE Fellow and a EURASIP Fellow.

== Work ==
Her research interests include sampling methods and A/D design, compressed sensing, detection and estimation theory, optimization for signal processing, medical imaging, signal processing and optimization for communication systems, signal and image processing for optics, deep learning and graphs, computational biology.

Upon receiving the IEEE Kiyo Tomiyasu Award (2016), her research work and its implications were described by the award committee:

Yonina Eldar’s pioneering work on sub-Nyquist sampling and reconstruction of sparse analog signals has demonstrated the potential to improve radar, medical imaging, communication, and storage systems. Bridging the gap between theory and real-world applications, Eldar developed the concept of “Xampling” for sub-Nyquist sampling and built hardware prototypes to demonstrate how the technique works in practical settings. The ability to sample signals at rates significantly lower than the standard Nyquist rate, but without the distortion normally associated with such techniques, positively impacts power consumption, storage memory, size, and digital signal processing rates in analog-to-digital converters. Eldar’s innovations will enable portable ultrasound machines for emergency and rural medicine, radar systems with improved resolution, and better wireless capabilities for cognitive (intelligent) radio transmission and reception.

== Publications ==
Eldar is the author of the book Sampling Theory: Beyond Bandlimited Systems (2015) and co-author of Compressed Sensing (2012) and Convex Optimization Methods in Signal Processing and Communications (2010), all published by Cambridge University Press.

She has more than 300 published journal articles and has registered more than 20 patents.

== Honors and awards ==
Eldar has received awards for excellence in research and teaching, including the IEEE Signal Processing Society Technical Achievement Award (2013), the IEEE/AESS Fred Nathanson Memorial Radar Award (2014), and the IEEE Kiyo Tomiyasu Award (2016). She was a Horev Fellow of the Leaders in Science and Technology program at the Technion (2002) and an Alon Fellow (2003). She received the Michael Bruno Memorial Award from the Rothschild Foundation(2010), the Weizmann Prize for Exact Sciences (2011), the Wolf Foundation Krill Prize for Excellence in Scientific Research (2004), the Henry Taub Prize for Excellence in Research (twice: 2015 and 2007), the Hershel Rich Innovation Award (three times: 2015, 2013 and 2008), the Andre and Bella Meyer Lectureship (2005), the Career Development Chair at the Technion, the Muriel & David Jacknow Award for Excellence in Teaching (2008), and the Technion’s Award for Excellence in Teaching (two times: 2013 and 2009).

She received several best paper awards and best demo awards together with her research students and colleagues, and was selected as one of the 50 most influential women in Israel (2011) and one of the 50 leading and influential academic women in Asia. She was also a member of the Israel Committee for Higher Education.

She is the Editor in Chief of Foundations and Trends in Signal Processing and a member of several IEEE Technical Committees and Award Committees.

== Personal life ==
Eldar has 5 children with her ex-husband Rabbi Shalomi Eldar.
