= IEEE Jack S. Kilby Signal Processing Medal =

- Awarded for: Outstanding achievements in signal processing
- Presented by: Institute of Electrical and Electronics Engineers
- First award: 1997
- Website: IEEE Jack S. Kilby Signal Processing Medal

The IEEE Jack S. Kilby Signal Processing Medal is presented "for outstanding achievements in signal processing" theory, technology or commerce. The recipients of this award will receive a gold medal, together with a replica in bronze, a certificate and an honorarium.

The award was established in 1995 by the Institute of Electrical and Electronics Engineers (IEEE) and is sponsored by Texas Instruments Inc. It is named after Jack S. Kilby, whose innovation – like the co-invention of the integrated circuit – was fundamental for the signal processor and related digital signal processing development. The award may be presented to an individual or a group up to three in number.

Nomination deadline: 1 July

Notification: Recipients are typically approved during the November IEEE Board of Directors meeting. Recipients and their nominators will be notified following the meeting. Then the nominators of unsuccessful candidates will be notified of the status of their nomination.

Presentation: At the annual IEEE Honors Ceremony

== Recipients ==
The following people have received the IEEE Jack S. Kilby Signal Processing Medal:

- 2026: Biing-Hwang (Fred) Juang
- 2025: Richard Gordon Baraniuk
- 2024: P. P. Vaidyanathan
- 2023: José M. F. Moura
- 2022: David Donoho
- 2021: Emmanuel Candès, Justin Romberg and Terence Tao
- 2020: Ramalingam Chellappa
- 2019: Alan Willsky
- 2018: Bede Liu
- 2017: Martin Vetterli
- 2016: Louis Scharf
- 2015: Harry L. Van Trees
- 2014: Thomas P. Barnwell, III
- 2013: Bishnu S. Atal
- 2012: G. Clifford Carter
- 2011: Ingrid Daubechies
- 2010: Ronald W. Schafer
- 2009: Charles Sidney Burrus
- 2008: Robert M. Gray
- 2007: Alan V. Oppenheim
- 2006: Thomas Kailath
- 2005: Fumitada Itakura
- 2004: Thomas W. Parks and James H. McClellan
- 2003: Hans W. Schuessler
- 2002: James W. Cooley
- 2001: Thomas S. Huang and Arun N. Netravali
- 2000: James F. Kaiser
- 1999: Lawrence R. Rabiner
- 1998: Thomas G. Stockham
- 1997: Bernard Gold and Charles M. Rader
