= Thomas W. Parks =

American electrical engineer (1939–2020)

Thomas W. Parks (born March 16, 1939, in Buffalo, New York, died December 24, 2020, in Ithaca, New York) was an American electrical engineer and Professor Emeritus of Electrical and Computer Engineering at Cornell University. He is best known for his contributions to digital signal processing, especially digital filter design and computation of the fast Fourier transform. His last work before retirement was in the area of demosaicing.

== Academic career ==
Tom Parks received his bachelor's degree in electrical engineering from Cornell in 1961. He worked for General Electric for two years, then returned to Cornell to earn his masters and PhD degrees in 1964 and 1967, respectively. Upon graduation he joined the electrical engineering faculty at Rice University in Houston, Texas, where he began teaching and working in the nascent field of digital signal processing. In 1972 he and James McClellan published an influential paper on digital filter design. In 1986 Parks returned to Cornell, where he spent the remainder of his career and retired as emeritus professor. Parks received multiple awards based on his research focused on digital signal processing with its application to signal theory, multirate systems, interpolation, and filter design. He co-authored more than 150 books and papers.

== Affiliations and awards ==
- Senior Fulbright fellowship (1973)
- Alexander von Humboldt Foundation Senior Scientist Award (1973)
- IEEE Signal Processing Society's Technical Achievement Award (1980)
- Life Fellow, IEEE (1982)
- Third Millennium Medal of the IEEE (2000)
- IEEE Jack S. Kilby Signal Processing Medal (2004), together with James H. McClellan
- National Academy of Engineering (2010)
