= Vanu Bose =

American electrical engineer and businessman

- Born: Vanu Amar Bose; April 29, 1965; Boston, Massachusetts, U.S.
- Died: November 11, 2017 (aged 52); Carlisle, Massachusetts, U.S.
- Education: MIT
- Occupations: Electrical engineer; founder and CEO of Vanu, Inc.
- Relatives: Amar Bose (father)

Vanu, Inc.
- Type: Private
- Founded: 1998; 28 years ago
- Headquarters: Cambridge, Massachusetts, U.S.
- Website: vanu.com

Vanu Gopal Bose (October 4, 1965 – November 11, 2017) was an American electrical engineer and the founder of Vanu Inc. He was the son of Amar Bose, the founder of Bose Corporation.

== Life and career ==
Bose was born in Boston, Massachusetts, in 1965 to Amar Bose and Prema Sarathy Bose. His parents later divorced. He attended Wayland High School and graduated in 1983. He attended his father's alma mater Massachusetts Institute of Technology and graduated with a BS in Computer Science, Electrical Engineering, and Mathematics in 1988, he earned an MS in 1994, and a PhD in 1999. He was the founder and CEO of Vanu, Inc., a firm that markets software-defined radio technology. The company uses technology based on his graduate research work, called SpectrumWare, under supervisors David L. Tennenhouse and John Guttag. The technology was licensed from MIT in 1999 after several rounds of negotiation.

In November 2004, its Anywave technology became the first use of software-defined radio certified by the US Federal Communications Commission, and ADC Telecommunications announced it would manufacture related hardware. In 2005, work with India's Centre for Development of Telematics (C-DOT) was announced to use its technology for base transceiver stations at cell sites in rural India. By 2008, a telecommunications provider in India was reported to be testing the technology.

A venture capital investment of $9 million in 2007 from Charles River Ventures was followed by $32 million in 2008, from an arm of the Tata Group, Norwest Venture Partners. A subsidiary, Vanu Coverage Company, announced $3.2 million investment in 2012.

He took his technology to many countries and regions that otherwise would have had no access. Shortly before his death, he donated durable solar-powered cellular sites to the devastated island of Puerto Rico to assist in the location of family members following the devastation by hurricanes in 2017.

== Personal life ==
Bose married Judith L. Hill in September 2007. They have one daughter. Bose died suddenly in Carlisle, Massachusetts on November 11, 2017, of a pulmonary embolism, aged 52.
