= A Computer Animated Hand =

- The title screen for the short film: A Computer Animated Hand
- Directed by: Edwin Catmull; Fred Parke
- Produced by: Edwin Catmull; Fred Parke
- Release date: 1972
- Running time: 4 minutes (approx.)
- Country: United States
- Language: Silent (intertitles in English)

A Computer Animated Hand is a 1972 American computer-animated short film produced by Edwin Catmull and Fred Parke. Produced during Catmull's tenure at the University of Utah, the brief was created as part of a graduate course project. After making a model of his left hand, 350 triangles and polygons were drawn in ink on its surface. The model was digitized from the data and laboriously animated in a three-dimensional animation program that Catmull wrote.

The hand animation consists of three sequences, all of which rotate. The first is the data output of the hand (now called vertices) connected by lines (now called edges), but not filled with faces. The second is a halftone sequence that shows flat shading but lacks smooth shading. The final, completed animation, featuring organic, smooth shading of the surface between the data points, depicts the hand swiveling, opening and closing, pointing at the viewer, and tilting back, allowing the camera to move to the inside of the hand. The clip also features computer-generated animations of an artificial heart valve and human faces. Snippets of the animations were used in the 1976 Hollywood science fiction film Futureworld.

The short film has been called groundbreaking and revolutionary for being one of the earliest examples of computer animation. Catmull went on to become a co-founder of Pixar and then its president, as well as president of Walt Disney Animation Studios. In 2011, The film was selected for preservation in the National Film Registry for being "culturally, historically, or aesthetically significant". Library of Congress scholars wrote: "In creating the film, Catmull worked out concepts that would become the foundation for computer graphics that followed."

== Production ==
Catmull hoped as a child to become a Disney animator, but reversed his ideas in high school, ruefully concluding he lacked the ability to draw. He graduated from the University of Utah in 1969 with degrees in computer science and physics, and took a job at Boeing shortly afterward. His position was soon terminated in a mass layoff along with thousands of other employees. Catmull revised his idea of becoming an animator during this time, believing computers might allow him to animate.

Fred Parke, a fellow Ph.D. student in his class who helped produce the film, recalled that computer animation was "sort of on the lunatic fringe at that time. [...] People were just barely to the point where they could get a computer to put out still images." It was obvious that it would take years for the state-of-the-art in computer hardware to catch up with this ambition, and there were multiple problems on the mathematical and programming side. Nevertheless, in 1972, Catmull seized the opportunity to create the short animated clip as part of a graduate course project.

Catmull used his left hand as the basis for the clip, first creating a model of it. He began making a plaster-of-Paris mold of his hand and accidentally pulled off the hair on the back of his hand while removing the mold. He then made a plaster model from the mold and drew 350 small triangles and polygons on the model in ink. Digital counterparts of these polygons would represent the surface of his hand in the computer.

Catmull and Parke spent a considerable amount of time crafting the film, measuring the coordinates of each corner point of the polygons, and typing them into the machine using a Teletype keyboard. With a 3-D animation program that Catmull wrote, they could reproduce the disembodied hand on a screen and make it move. During this time, Parke had also created a computer animation of his wife's face, which is seen in the film.

Transferring the images to film was a task in itself. Because the display hardware never showed the entire image on screen at any one moment, Catmull could see a frame of his work only by taking a long-exposure Polaroid of the screen and looking at the snapshot. Once satisfied, he then shot the footage using a 35mm camera the department rigged to take photographs from a CRT screen. The film credits fellow student Bob Ingebretsen for creating the 3D titles.

== Legacy ==
In this sequence in the film, the viewer sees a digitized human hand composed of lines.

Professor Ivan Sutherland opened a line of communication with The Walt Disney Company to see whether Disney could be persuaded to use computer graphics in its production process for traditional animation. Sutherland brought Catmull to Disney to meet with executives, but Disney management was not interested in computer graphics at that time. Instead, they invited Catmull (to no avail) to help the Disney Imagineering team utilize computers to design a new ride—specifically, Space Mountain, a roller-coaster ride planned for the new Walt Disney World complex in Orlando, Florida. The clips were later used on a TV monitor in the 1976 science-fiction thriller Futureworld, about a futuristic theme park where androids are programmed to grant every guest's wish.

Catmull would later go on to form his own Computer Graphics Lab, which George Lucas of Lucasfilm later contacted to bring computer graphics into the entertainment field. The Graphics Group, one-third of the computer division at Lucasfilm, was later acquired in 1986 by Apple Computer co-founder Steve Jobs, and it was renamed Pixar. Pixar produced the world's first computer-animated feature film, Toy Story, in 1995, and has since become the world's dominant animation studio, producing a string of commercially and critically immensely successful films. Catmull has won four Academy Awards for his technical feats and helped create some of the key computer-generated imagery software animators rely on today.

The film has been labeled a landmark, being called revolutionary in both the art of animation and film. Craig Caldwell, senior research professor at the University of Utah, stated in 2011 that the film is groundbreaking because "it showed the potential of putting three-dimensional form in the computer". In 2011, the film was selected for preservation in the Library of Congress' National Film Registry, dubbed culturally, historically, or aesthetically significant."

== See also ==
- List of American films of 1972
