= Ronald W. Schafer =

American engineer (born 1938)

- Born: February 17, 1938 (age 88); Tecumseh, Nebraska, US
- Education: Massachusetts Institute of Technology
- Scientific career
- Fields: Electrical engineering
- Workplaces: Georgia Institute of Technology
- Doctoral advisor: Alan V. Oppenheim
- Doctoral students: Steven M. Kay

Ronald W. Schafer (born February 17, 1938) is an American electrical engineer notable for his contributions to digital signal processing.

After receiving his Ph.D. degree at Massachusetts Institute of Technology in 1968, he joined the Acoustics Research Department at Bell Laboratories, where he did research on digital signal processing and digital speech coding. In 1974 he joined the Georgia Institute of Technology, where he became a professor in electrical engineering, until leaving to join Hewlett-Packard in March 2005.

He has served as associate editor of IEEE Transactions on Acoustics, Speech, and Signal Processing and as vice-president and president of the IEEE Signal Processing Society. He is a Life Fellow of the IEEE and a Fellow of the Acoustical Society of America. He is also a member of the National Academy of Engineering in 1994 for research, teaching, and leadership in signal processing.

He has received the IEEE Region 3 Outstanding Engineer Award, the 1980 IEEE Emanuel R. Piore Award, the Distinguished Professor Award at the Georgia Institute of Technology, the 1992 IEEE Education Medal and the 2010 IEEE Jack S. Kilby Signal Processing Medal.

== Books ==
- Digital Signal Processing, A. V. Oppenheim, R. W. Schafer, Prentice Hall, 1975
- Digital Processing of Speech Signals, L. Rabiner, R. W. Schafer, Pearson Education, 1978.
- Discrete-Time Signal Processing, A. V. Oppenheim, R. W. Schafer, Pearson, 2010.
- Computer-Based Exercises for Signal Processing Using MATLAB, J. H. McClellan, C. S. Burrus, A. V. Oppenheim, T. W. Parks, R. W. Schafer, H. W. Schuessler, Prentice Hall, 1998
- DSP First: A Multimedia Approach J. H. McClellan, R. W. Schafer, M. A. Yoder, Upper Saddle River, NJ: Prentice-Hall, Inc., 1998.
- Signal Processing First J. H. McClellan, R. W. Schafer, M. A. Yoder, Upper Saddle River, NJ: Prentice-Hall, Inc., 2003.
