= Schüssel =

Schüssel is a German surname. Notable people with the surname include:

- George Schussel, American businessman entrepreneur
- Maria Schüssel, maiden name of Maria von Welser, German TV journalist and the President of UNICEF Germany
- Wolfgang Schüssel, Austrian politician, former Chancellor of Austria

== See also ==
- Schüssler
- Shissel
