= Thomas Stockham =

American scientist (1933–2004)

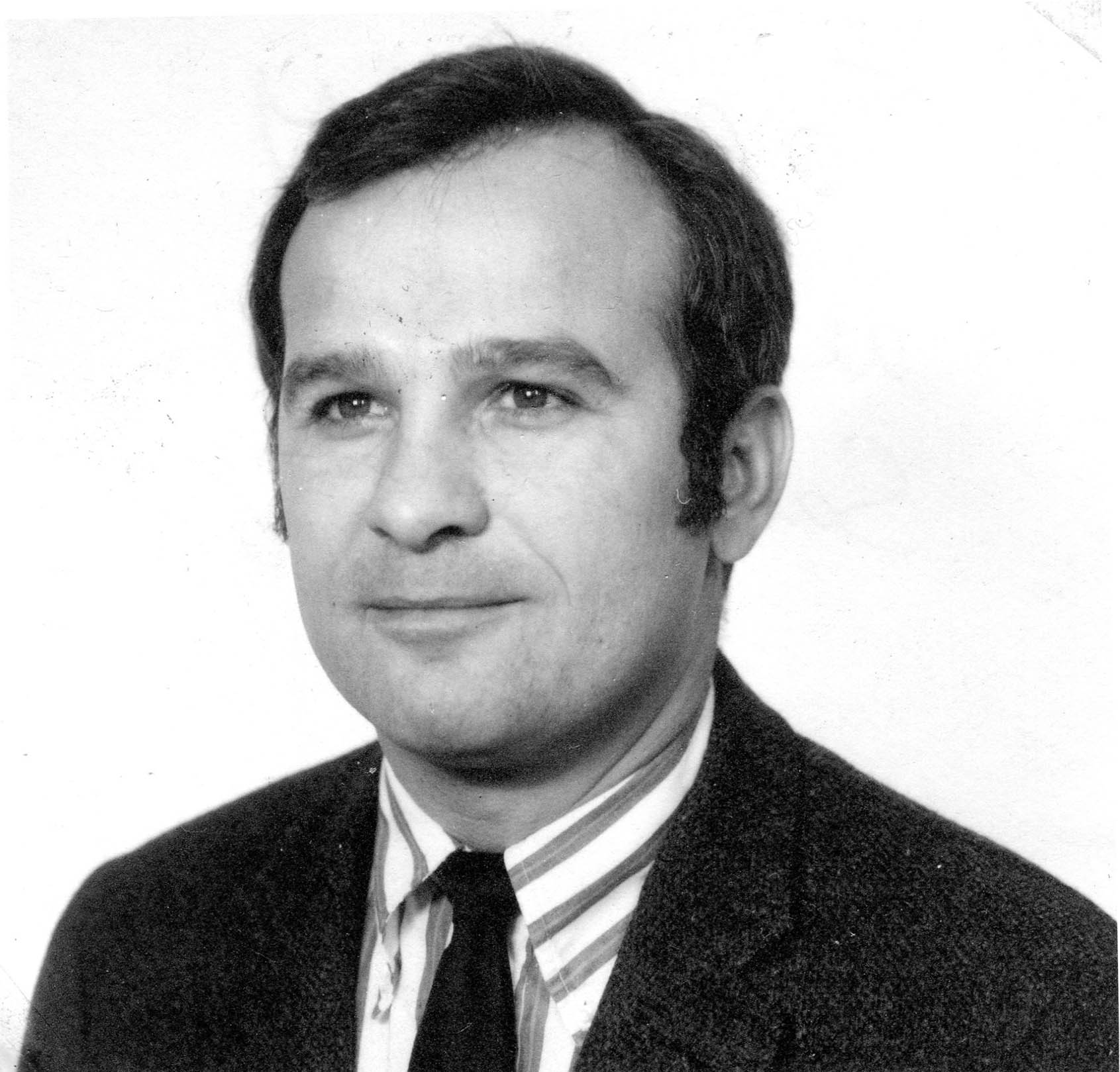
- Tom Stockham, Salt Lake City, 1970
- Born: December 22, 1933; Passaic, New Jersey, U.S.
- Died: January 6, 2004 (aged 70); Salt Lake City, Utah, U.S.
- Education: Massachusetts Institute of Technology
- Awards: Grammy Emmy Award; IEEE Jack S. Kilby Signal Processing Medal AES Gold Medal
- Scientific career
- Fields: Electrical engineering
- Workplaces: Soundstream; University of Utah
- Doctoral students: Raphael Rom; Olivier Faugeras

Thomas Greenway Stockham (December 22, 1933 – January 6, 2004) was an American scientist who developed one of the first practical digital audio recording systems, and pioneered techniques for digital audio recording and processing. He also led the development of the Digital Audio Tape (DAT) system.

== Life and career ==
Stockham was born in Passaic, New Jersey. Stockham attended Montclair Kimberley Academy, graduating in the class of 1951. Known as the "father of digital recording", he earned an Sc.D. degree from the Massachusetts Institute of Technology in 1959 and was appointed Assistant Professor of Electrical Engineering. Early in his academic career at MIT, Stockham worked closely with Amar Bose, founder of Bose Corporation, on the use of digital computers for measurement and simulation of room acoustics and for audio recording and enhancement.

While at MIT, he noticed several of the students using an MIT Lincoln Laboratory TX-0 mainframe computer installed at the campus to record their voices digitally into the computer's memory, using a microphone connected to an analog-to-digital converter and a loudspeaker connected to a digital-to-analog converter, both attached to the TX-0, running the Expensive Tape Recorder application that fellow MIT students David Gross and Alan Kotok wrote for the TX-0 from 1959 to 1962. This application led Stockham to using the TX-0 for his own digital audio experiments starting in 1962. For the TX-0 Stockham, along with fellow MIT staff member Jack B. Dennis, also coauthored the pioneering interactive symbolic debugger FLIT.

In 1968, he left MIT for the University of Utah, and in 1975, founded Soundstream, Inc. The company developed a 16-bit digital audio recording system using a 16-track Honeywell instrumentation tape recorder as a transport, connected to digital audio recording and playback hardware of Stockham's design. It ran at a sampling rate of 50 kHz, as opposed to the audio CD sampling rate of 44.1 kHz.

Soundstream Inc. was the first commercial digital recording company in the United States, located in Salt Lake City. Stockham was the first to make a commercial digital recording, using his own Soundstream recorder in 1976 at the Santa Fe Opera. In 1980, Soundstream merged with the Digital Recording Company (DRC) and became DRC/Soundstream.

Stockham played a key role in the digital restoration of Enrico Caruso recordings, described in a 1975 IEEE paper. These acoustic recordings were the first to be digitally restored by computer, and were released on the album Caruso - A Legendary Performer, issued in 1976 by RCA Records.

=== Watergate investigation ===
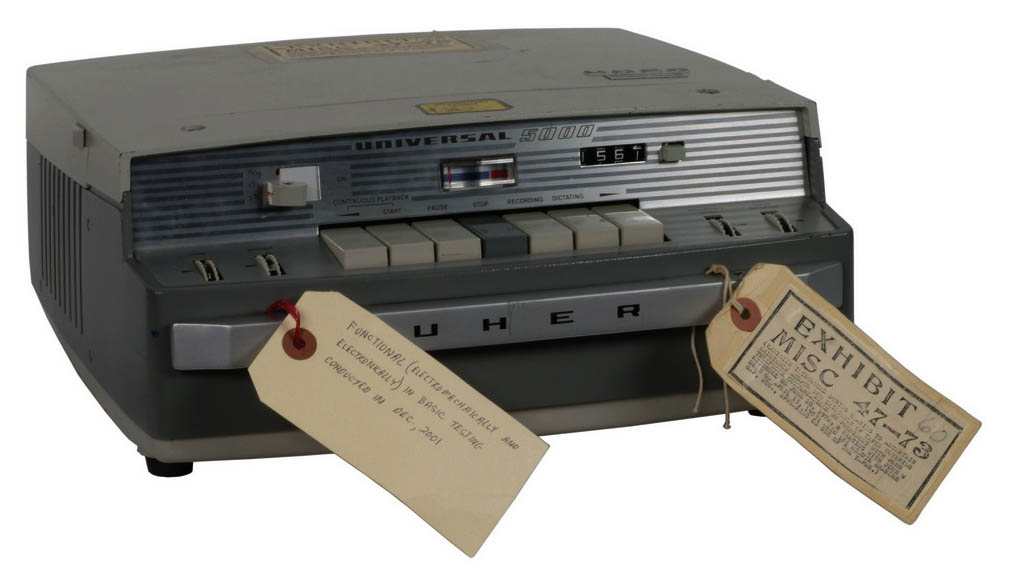
Uher 5000 tape recorder, operated by White House secretary Rosemary Wood as part of President Richard Nixon's White House taping system.

In 1974, he investigated President Richard Nixon's White House tapes, alongside fellow members of the panel of persons nominated jointly by the White House and the Special Prosecution Force. It was he who discovered that the 18 minutes of erasures were not accidental, as Nixon's secretary Rosemary Woods claimed. Stockham was able to discern several distinct erasures and even determined the order of erasure.

Stockham's team reached agreement on seven conclusions detailed in their 87-page report to Chief Judge John J. Sirica:

1. The erasing and recording operations that produced the buzz section were done directly on the evidence tape.

2. The Uher 5000 recorder designated Government Exhibit #60 probably produced the entire buzz section.

3. The erasures and buzz recordings were done in at least five, and perhaps as many as nine, separate and contiguous segments.

4. Erasure and recording of each segment required hand operation of keyboard controls on the Uher 5000 machine.

5. Erased portions of the tape probably contained speech originally.

6. Recovery of the speech is not possible by any method known to us.

7. The evidence tape, insofar as we have determined, is an original and not a copy.

=== Development of audio technology ===
Stockham led the development of the Digital Audio Tape (DAT) format, a user-recordable digital tape that was popular for a time in the 1990s. The continually lowering price of compact discs led to DAT being used only in certain roles, and its last major manufacturer, Sony, phased out development starting in 2005.

Stockham received wide recognition for his pioneering contributions to digital audio. He received, among many others, the Gold Medal award from the Audio Engineering Society in 1987, a Technical Emmy award in 1988, the Poniatoff Gold Medal from the Society of Motion Picture and Television Engineers, a Grammy award from NARAS in 1994, the IEEE Jack S. Kilby Signal Processing Medal in 1998 and a Scientific and Engineering award from the Academy of Motion Picture Arts and Sciences in 1999.
