= Hamid Nawab =

American engineer and academic

S. Hamid Nawab
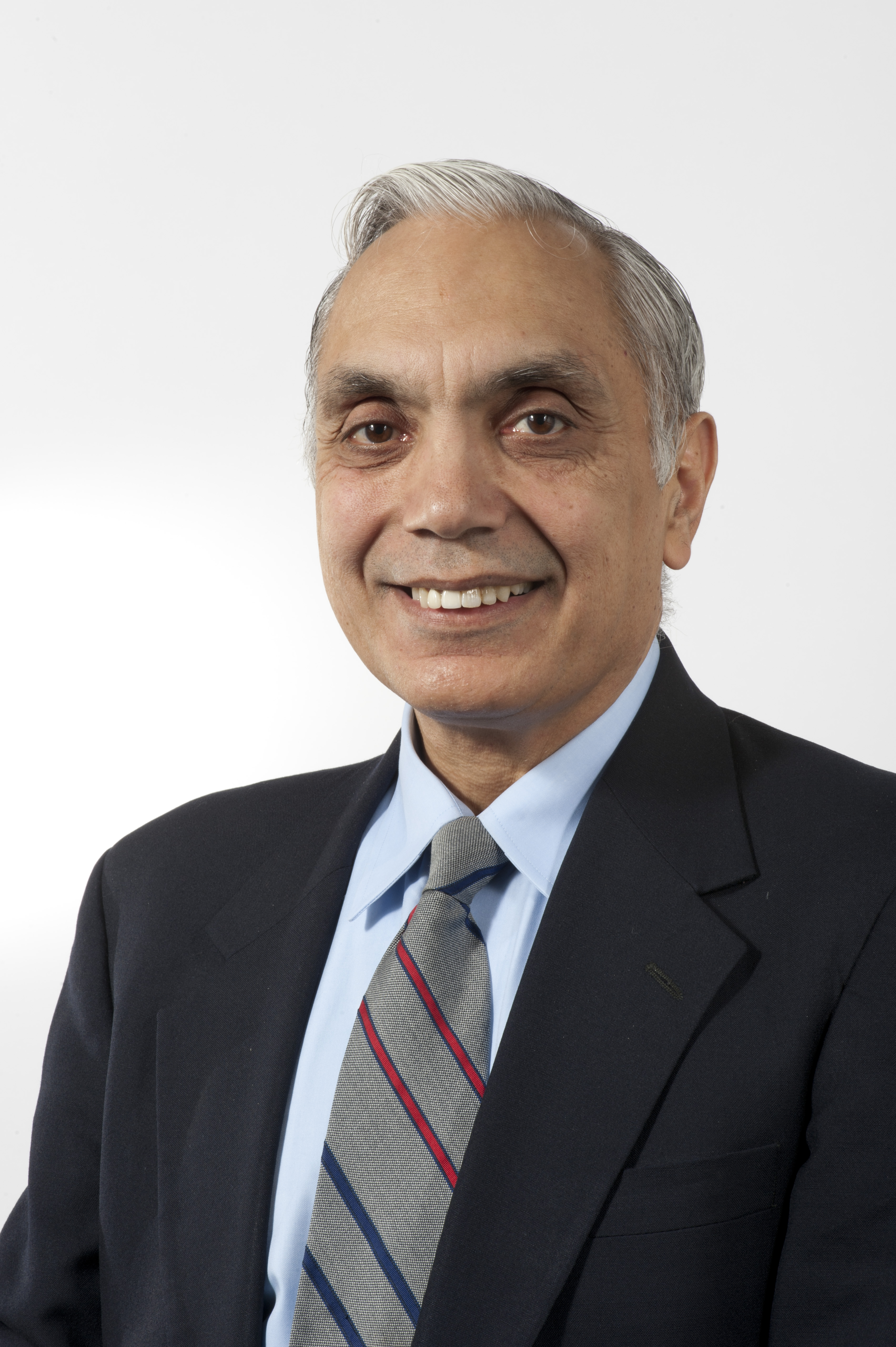
- Nawab in 2015
- Education: Massachusetts Institute of Technology (MIT)
- Known for: Analysis of biosignals from speech, auditory and neuromuscular systems
- Scientific career
- Fields: Signal processing, artificial intelligence
- Workplaces: Boston University, MIT
- Doctoral advisor: Alan V. Oppenheim

Syed Hamid Nawab is an American engineer. He is a Professor of Electrical and Computer Engineering and Biomedical Engineering at Boston University.

== Education ==
Nawab received his BS degree in Electrical Engineering, MS degree in Electrical Engineering and Computer Science, and PhD degree in Electrical Engineering from the Massachusetts Institute of Technology (MIT) in 1977, 1979 and 1982, respectively.

== Career ==
Nawab is an elected fellow of the American Institute of Medical and Biological Engineering (AIMBE) for contributions to the analysis of complex biosignals from speech, auditory, and neuromuscular systems.

Key journal articles written by Nawab include "Integrated Processing and Understanding of Signals", "Decomposition of Surface EMG Signals", "Approximate Signal Processing", "Direction Determination of Wideband Signals" (winner of the 1988 Paper Award from IEEE Signal Processing Society in the Multidimensional Signal Processing category), and "Signal Reconstruction from Short-time Fourier Transform Magnitude".

Among his other major written works is the book Symbolic and Knowledge-Based Signal Processing at the intersection of signal processing and artificial intelligence research, as well as the textbook Signals and Systems that he co-authored with Alan V. Oppenheim and Alan S. Willsky. The textbook has been adopted around the world with its international edition and its Chinese edition.

Nawab is currently a tenured full professor at Boston University, where he has earned five teaching awards, including the university-wide Metcalf Award for Excellence in Teaching. He has held visiting professorships in Electrical Engineering at MIT (1994–95) and in Computer Science at University of Massachusetts, Amherst (1989–90).

Nawab is also Co-founder and Chief Scientist of Yobe Inc.

== Personal life ==
Nawab is a Pakistani-American. He currently lives in Andover, Massachusetts, with his wife and son. He has lived in the Greater Boston area since 1974 when he first arrived in the US to attend college.
