= Chalfont Records =

American record label

Chalfont Records was an American record label located in Montgomery, Alabama, and associated with Varèse Sarabande.

Chalfont made recordings of the London Symphony Orchestra, the National Symphony Orchestra, the Royal Liverpool Philharmonic, Noel Rawsthorne, and Carlo Curley. These recordings were made in the late 1970s to early 1980s using the Soundstream recording and editing systems.

Chalfont made two premier soundtrack recordings: John Williams' The Empire Strikes Back (c1980) and Erich Wolfgang Korngold's Kings Row (c1979).

== See also ==
- List of record labels
