= True Myth =

- Origin: London, Ontario, Canada
- Genres: Progressive rock
- Years active: 1977–1981
- Label: Warner Bros.
- Past members: Tony Cook; Brian Bolliger; Steve McKenna; Bruce Cumming; Tom Treumuth; Kirk Devereux; Malcolm McGuigan; Bob Stirajs

True Myth was a Canadian progressive rock musical group from in London, Ontario. The group is noted for having created the first digitally recorded album in Canada.

== History ==
True Myth formed in 1977 at London's Fanshawe College, where the members were students. They began the group for a class project.

The band was signed to A & R Recording by Gary Muth, and released their self-titled Warner Bros. Records album in 1979. The album was recorded live in Toronto at Sound Stage Studios, produced by Jack Richardson using a leased two-track digital Soundstream recorder brought in for the purpose. This was the first digitally-recorded album in Canada, and was recorded in four days live with no overdubs. The music contained elements of progressive rock and jazz rock. The band members at that time were guitarist Tony Cook, drummer Brian Bolliger, Steve McKenna on bass and slide guitar, singer Bruce Cumming, and keyboardist Tom Treumuth. Ian Thomas and Marek Norman musicians contributed backup vocals, Matt McKenna provided additional guitar and organ work, and Erik Cadeski's percussion and wind-up fish in a tank can also be heard.

Not long after that, Treumuth and Gary Furniss formed their own independent label, Hypnotic. True Myth's second (and last) album Telegram was released through that company. Some of this album was recorded with Daniel Lanois engineering at Grant Avenue Studios in Hamilton, Ontario. The band had made some line-up changes before and during the making of Telegram. Original members Treumuth, McKenna, Cook, and Bolliger were joined by drummer Kirk Devereux, singer Malcolm McGuigan, and guitarist Bob Stirajs. Singer David Roberts, guitarist Domenic Troiano and clarinet player Jim Gilmour contributed to the album as well.

== Discography ==
=== Singles ===
- 1981: "Give It Up" (Hypnotic)

=== Albums ===
- 1979: True Myth (Warner Bros. Records)
- 1981: Telegram (Hypnotic)
