= Soundstream =

Digital audio recording company

- Industry: Digital audio
- Founded: 1975
- Founder: Thomas Stockham

Soundstream Inc. was the first United States audiophile digital audio recording company, providing commercial services for recording and computer-based editing.

== Company ==
Soundstream was founded in 1975 in Salt Lake City, Utah, by Thomas Stockham. The company provided worldwide on-location recording services to Telarc, Delos, RCA, Philips, Vanguard, Varèse Sarabande, Angel, Warner Brothers, CBS, Decca, Chalfont, and other labels. They manufactured a total of 18 digital recorders, of which seven were sold and the rest leased out. Although most recordings were of classical music, the range included country, rock, jazz, pop, and avant-garde.

The first US live digital recording was made in 1976 by Soundstream's prototype 37 kHz, 16-bit, two channel recorder. New World Records recorded the Santa Fe Opera's performance of Virgil Thomson's The Mother of Us All, and provided Soundstream with a stereo feed from their multitrack console. Soundstream demonstrated this recording at the Fall 1976 AES Convention; however the resulting record was pressed not from the digital master but from the analog tape that New World recorded themselves concurrently. Critiques of the recording, most notably from Telarc's Jack Renner and Robert Woods, led directly to the improved four-channel, 50 kHz rate recorder that was used for all of Soundstream's future commercial releases.

Also in 1976, Soundstream restored acoustic (pre-electronic) recordings of Enrico Caruso, by digitizing the recordings on a computer, and processing them using a technique called "blind deconvolution". These were released by RCA Records as "Caruso – A Legendary Performer". In subsequent years Soundstream restored most of the RCA Caruso catalog, as well as some RCA recordings by Irish tenor John McCormack.

Soundstream's first commercially released recording, Diahann Carroll With the Duke Ellington Orchestra Under The Direction Of Mercer Ellington – A Tribute To Ethel Waters (on the Orinda label) appeared in January 1978. Over the next three years, almost 50% of all classical music recorded digitally used Soundstream equipment, over 200 recordings in all. The Canadian rock band, True Myth, recorded their self-titled debut album using the Soundstream unit, the first Canadian digital recording. The band recorded the album live to two-track stereo in Jack Richardson's studio, Nimbus Nine, located in Toronto, Canada.

Unlike its competitors, Soundstream's analog circuitry was transformerless, permitting a frequency response to 0Hz (DC). This accounted for the "bass drum heard round the world" review of the 1978 Telarc recording of Frederick Fennell: The Cleveland Symphonic Winds. Soundstream collaborated with Telarc for several years, producing legendary symphonic recordings; the earliest ones are chronicled in Renner. The care with which Telarc selected and used its microphones and audio console, combined with the Soundstream recorder, created a gold standard for audiophile recording. Telarc has re-released many of its original Soundstream recordings in SACD format.

Soundstream recordings made before the advent of the CD were released as high-quality vinyl LP albums. Despite analog playback, many of these releases were sufficiently impressive to gain an early acceptance for digital audio. The recording industry's transition to digital was further facilitated by the many demonstrations given by Dr. Stockham, whose articulate explanations of digital audio theory and practice were renowned.

In 1980, Digital Recording Corporation (DRC) acquired Soundstream. DRC attempted to develop a home digital player that would use a photographically reproducible optical card as opposed to the mechanically pressed CD. This effort was eclipsed by the rise of the CD, leading to the company's demise in 1985.

== Technology ==
The company developed its four-channel, 16-bit, 50 kilosamples-per-second (ksps) recorder in 1977. The Soundstream Digital Tape Recorder (DTR) consisted of a modified Honeywell 5600E instrumentation transport and analog and digital circuitry designed and built by Soundstream.

There were two series of DTR's built. The first series (SN 1–4) was produced from ~1977 to 1979 and the second series (SN 5- 13) was produced from ~1980 to 1981. While being tape format compatible and looking nearly identical from the outside, the later series are easily identified by the second set of tape transport control buttons. Some internal cards are not 100% compatible between the two series.

=== Digital Tape Recorder ===
Promotional / publicity photo of the Soundstream Digital Tape Recorder.

The Digital Tape Recorder was a portable four-channel digital audio processor containing the analog to digital converters, tape-data recovery and clock generation circuits, and the digital to analog converters. External hardware (tape drive, editing system, and digital delay unit) connected to the DTR through connectors on the back panel. The unit measured 20"×18"×10" and weighed 67 pounds.

Analog signals entered the DTR through standard XLR connectors at the rear of the unit. There, a differential input amplifier routed the signal through the front panel attenuation fader to the input low-pass anti-aliasing filter.

The anti-aliasing filter (custom made by TTE Filters) is a passive 11-pole elliptical filter with a −3 dB point of 22.5 kHz. The analog signal path from input XLR connector to the analog-to-digital converter is DC coupled.

The filtered analog signal passed through a custom sample and hold and was digitized by an Analogic MP8016 16-bit analog-to-digital converter operating at a 50 kHz sample rate. A three-bit sync pattern and an even-parity bit were added to each 16-bit sample to form a 20-bit word that was serialized and transmitted by interface electronics to the tape transport where each audio channel's data were written to two separate tape tracks. The two tracks are laterally separated by ~ 11mm on the 1" tape, thus avoiding the same tape dropout from affecting both tracks containing identical channel information.

Encoding of the 16-bit audio at the time of recording inverts every other audio bit in order to minimize DC going to tape (magnetic channel) in quiet passages when the most significant bits were mostly zeros. Another effect of the encoding process was to increase AC in the channel code to aid in clock recovery (bit sync) on playback. The every other bit inversion encoding process is reversed on playback so there is no effect on audio quality.

During tape playback or while recording and monitoring from tape, the redundant tracks of recorded data from the transport were sent to data recovery circuitry. The first stage of data recovery was the data slicer which automatically detected and adjusted to the ideal threshold for detecting the zero crossings of the magnetic channel data. This reduced clock recovery jitter. Because the data recorded on tape are necessarily bandwidth-limited, the data slicer squared-up the data signals into binary logic level signals and then recovered clocks to match the incoming data streams. Additional circuitry located word boundaries and converted the data to parallel format. In the event of tape dropouts, an error-avoidance scheme selected the unaffected track's data.

The selected data were then clocked into an Analogic MP1926A digital-to-analog converter (DAC) at the original crystal-controlled sample rate. The DAC's analog output signal was buffered by an Analogic MP201A distortion suppression amplifier (aka deglitching amplifier). The MP201A suppresses the glitches present during the narrow segment of time that the binary input word to the DAC was transitioning from one sample to another.

The analog signal from the distortion suppression amplifier was routed to the output low-pass (reconstruction) filter that is identical to the input anti-alias filter and then to NE5534 based output buffer amplifier with a discrete transistor output stage. Voltage and current gain sufficient for +20dBm into 150 ohms was provided by the output-buffer amplifier with the signal then output at the XLR connector on the DTR's rear panel. The output signal path from DAC to output XLR connector was DC coupled.

=== Honeywell Tape Drives ===
Soundstream-modified Honeywell 5600e Instrumentation Tape Drives (HTD) used custom high-frequency 18-track record and playback heads. The two outer tracks were reserved for ancillary data – SMPTE time code and the like. The remaining sixteen tracks were used to record up to eight channels of digital audio – two redundant tracks for each audio channel. The two tracks in a redundant track pair were separated as widely as possible to minimize playback errors due to tape defects (dropouts) – audio channel one was recorded on tracks 1 and 9.

At the front of the HTD, Soundstream installed track selector hardware. The left side selector allowed the operator to choose which audio channel pair (1,2; 3,4) was assigned to which tape track pair (1,2; 3,4; 5,6; or 7,8). The right-side selector controlled the application of record circuitry power for each of the eight tracks.

The HTD initially used 1" Ampex 460 reel-to-reel tape at 35 ips. Later, Soundstream switched to Ampex 466 tape which allowed for the slower tape speed of 30 ips.

=== Digital editing system ===
Soundstream's digital editing system was the first instance of a computer used to edit commercial recordings. It consisted of a Digital Equipment PDP 11/60 computer running the DAP (Digital Audio Processor) editing software (written by Soundstream employee Robert Ingebretsen), Soundstream's interface (the Digital Audio Interface) to transfer data between its recorder and the computer's disks (a pair of Braegen 14" disk drives), digital-to-analog playback hardware, a text-based video display terminal for entering commands to operate and control the DAP software, and a storage oscilloscope to display the waveforms of the audio being edited or processed. For all intents and purposes, this system was the very first digital audio workstation. In addition to its own facility, Soundstream installed editing systems at Paramount Pictures (Hollywood), RCA (New York), and Bertelsmann (Germany). A system was delivered to the U.S. Department of Justice to aid the analysis of bootleg recordings.

Editing could be performed at sample accuracy (i.e., 1/50,000 of a second); any mixing was performed digitally.

The sound system in the editing room in the Salt Lake facility used a Threshold SL-10 preamp, a Sumo "The Power" amp, and Infinity RS4.5 speakers.

=== Ancillary equipment ===
==== Digital Audio Interface ====
The Digital Audio Interface (DAI) was the input/output path between the Digital Editing System and external hardware. The DAI received raw source data from session tapes and passed the data on to the editing system's computer for storage. Finished (edited) data passed through the DAI from the editing system's computer to a DTR for creation of a master tape. During the editing process, data from the editing system's computer passed through the DAI to a Digital Audio Conversion Unit (DAC Box) in the editing room.

The DAI resided in the Editing System's computer and contained a one-megabyte FIFO. Realtime input/output capacity was eight channels of 16-bit audio data at any of the then standard sample rates.

==== Digital Delay Unit ====
To allow for a preview channel during the LP cutting process, Soundstream built a digital delay unit (DDU). Digital data from tape could be delayed by a user selectable time: 3 ms to 1.308 s in increments of 5.12 ms. Delay was accomplished by the use of a variable-depth FIFO or ring buffer.

==== S-1610 adapter ====
So that users of the Sony PCM-1610 Digital Audio Processor could take advantage of Soundstream's editing system, the company developed the S-1610 Adapter. The adapter was a bidirectional two-channel format converter. Data from the Sony PCM-1610 were converted to the format used by the Soundstream DTR so that the data appearing at the input to the Digital Audio Interface looked to the DAI as if it had come from a DTR. Similarly, finished (edited) data in Soundstream format were restored to the Sony format by the adapter. Sony data were imported/exported at either of the two sample rates 44.1 kHz or 44.1/1.001 kHz.

Any metadata in the Sony format were lost in the format conversion. This was a format conversion only, the adapter did not do sample rate conversion.

==== M adapter ====
So that users of the 3M Digital Mastering System could take advantage of Soundstream's editing system, the company developed the M Adapter. The adapter was a bidirectional eight-channel format converter. Data from the 3M Digital Mastering System were converted to the format used by the Soundstream DTR so that the data appearing at the input to the Digital Audio Interface looked to the DAI as if it had come from a DTR. Similarly, finished (edited) data in Soundstream format were restored to the 3M format by the adapter.

==== DAC box ====
Essentially derived from the DTR's playback circuitry, the DAC Box was a four-channel device used by the Soundstream editors to audition audio data during the editing process. Audio played from the computer through the Digital Audio Interface into the DAC Box.
