= Lee Yuk-wing =

Chinese-American engineer and professor (1904-1989)

Lee Yuk Wing
- Born: April 14, 1904; Macau, Portuguese Macau
- Died: November 8, 1989 (aged 85); San Mateo, California, USA
- Education: Massachusetts Institute of Technology (BS, MS, Sc.D.)
- Alma mater: Massachusetts Institute of Technology
- Occupations: Professor, Researcher, Educator, Author
- Writing career
- Language: English, Chinese
- Subjects: Cybernetics, communication theory, statistics
- Notable work: Statistical Theory of Communication

Lee Yuk Wing (Chinese: 李郁榮; April 14, 1904 – November 8, 1989) was Professor Emeritus of electrical engineering at the Massachusetts Institute of Technology. He is best known for adapting and popularizing Norbert Wiener's theory of cybernetics and for his own statistical theory of communication.

== Biography ==
Lee was born in Macau, then part of the Portuguese Empire, and called "Yuwing" or "YW" by his friends. He was a longtime collaborator of Wiener. Everett M. Rogers, Distinguished Professor Emeritus of Communication and Journalism at the University of New Mexico, noted in his highly acclaimed book on the history of communication research that "out of his collaboration with a former doctoral student from China, Y. W. Lee, Wiener in 1934 became interested in the concept of feedback, the building block in the cybernetic theory that was to make him world famous."

After receiving a B.S. in 1927, an M.S. in 1928, and a Sc.D. in 1930 at MIT , Lee returned to China and taught at Tsinghua University. He invited Wiener there in 1935–1937. In 1946, he came back to MIT as Visiting Professor and undertook his research on statistical communication theory. He stayed at MIT as Professor in the Department of Electrical Engineering until his retirement in 1969. He was an excellent teacher and an experienced mentor. John Costas, Harry L. Van Trees, Irwin Jacobs and Amar Bose were among his students at MIT. He then moved to Belmont, California and died from leukemia in San Mateo, California.

Charles W. Therrien, Professor of Electrical and Computer Engineering at the Naval Postgraduate School, who considered Lee as one of the unsung heroes of his era, stated: "Lee’s own contributions, although significant, are not well known. However, his contributions to teaching and bringing the ideas of Wiener into electrical engineering are without precedent." Lee was the first scientist who "used the term network synthesis filters in modern sense" in 1930 and "used the term synthesis to describe the process of assembling an array of elements to meet a specific set of performance requirements in network synthesis by means of Fourier transforms of Laguerre functions" in 1932.

== Publications ==
- Lee, Y. W. (1930). Synthesis of electrical networks by means of the Fourier transforms of Laguerre's functions (Unpublished doctoral dissertation). Massachusetts Institute of Technology, Cambridge, MA.
- Lee, Y. W. (1932). Synthesis of electric networks by means of the Fourier transforms of Laguerre's functions. Journal of Mathematics and Physics, 11(1–4), 83–113. https://doi.org/10.1002/sapm193211183
- Lee, Y. W. (1950). Application of statistical methods to communication problems (Technical Report No. 181). Cambridge, MA: Research Laboratory of Electronics, Massachusetts Institute of Technology.
- Lee, Y. W. (1960). Statistical theory of communication. New York: Wiley.
- Lee, Y. W. (1964). Contributions of Norbert Wiener to linear theory and nonlinear theory in engineering. In Y. M. Lee, Norman Levinson, & W. T. Martin (Eds.), Selected Papers of Norbert Wiener (pp. 17–34). Cambridge, MA: MIT Press.
- Lee, Y. W., & Jaynes, E. T. (1961). Statistical theory of communication. American Journal of Physics, 29(4), 276–278. https://doi.org/10.1119/1.1937745

== See also ==
- Communication sciences
- Communication studies
- Communication theory
- Cybernetics
- Norbert Wiener
