= Amar Bose =

American engineer (1929–2013)

- Born: Amar Gopal Bose; November 2, 1929; Philadelphia, Pennsylvania, U.S.
- Died: July 12, 2013 (aged 83); Wayland, Massachusetts, U.S.
- Occupations: Engineer, entrepreneur, founder of Bose Corporation
- Spouse(s): Prema Bose (divorced); Ursula Boltshauser (widowed)
- Children: 2, including Vanu

Academic background
- Education: Massachusetts Institute of Technology (BS, MS, DSc)
- Thesis: A theory of nonlinear systems (1956)
- Doctoral advisor: Norbert Wiener; Yuk-Wing Lee

Academic work
- Doctoral students: Alan V. Oppenheim

Amar Gopal Bose (Bengali pronunciation: [ɔmoɾ ɡopal boʃu]; November 2, 1929 – July 12, 2013) was an American entrepreneur and academic. An electrical engineer and sound engineer, he was a professor at the Massachusetts Institute of Technology for over 45 years. He was also the founder and chairman of Bose Corporation.

In 2011, he donated a majority of the company to MIT in the form of non-voting shares to sustain and advance MIT's education and research mission.

== Early life and education ==
Amar Gopal Bose was born in Philadelphia, Pennsylvania, to a Bengali father, Noni Gopal Bose and an American mother, Charlotte Mechlin (1895–1973). His mother was a schoolteacher of French and German ancestry. His father was an Indian independence activist who, having been imprisoned for his political activities, fled Bengal in the 1920s to avoid further persecution by the British colonial police.

Bose first displayed his entrepreneurial skills and his interest in electronics at 13 when, during World War II, he enlisted school friends as co-workers in a small home business repairing model trains and home radios, to supplement his family's income.

After graduating from Abington Senior High School in Abington, Pennsylvania, Bose enrolled at the Massachusetts Institute of Technology, graduating with a BS (Bachelor of Science) in Electrical Engineering in the early 1950s. Bose spent a year at Philips Natuurkundig Laboratorium in Eindhoven, Netherlands and a year as a Fulbright research student in New Delhi, India, where he met his future first wife. He completed his PhD in Electrical Engineering from MIT, writing a thesis on non-linear systems under the supervision of Norbert Wiener and Yuk-Wing Lee.

== Career ==
Following graduation, Bose became an assistant professor at the Massachusetts Institute of Technology. During his early years as a professor, Bose purchased a high-end stereo system in 1956 and was disappointed to find that speakers with impressive technical specifications failed to reproduce the realism of a live performance. This would eventually motivate his extensive speaker technology research, concentrating on major weaknesses in the high-end speaker systems available at the time. His research on acoustics led him to develop a stereo loudspeaker that would reproduce, in a domestic setting, the dominantly reflected sound field that characterizes the listening space of the audience in a concert hall. His focus on psychoacoustics later became a hallmark of his company's audio products.

For initial capital to fund his company in 1964, Bose turned to angel investors, including his MIT thesis advisor and professor, Lee Yuk-wing. Bose was awarded significant patents in two fields that continue to be important to the Bose Corporation. These patents were in the area of loudspeaker design and non-linear, two-state modulated, Class-D power processing.

In the 1980s, Bose developed an electromagnetic replacement for automotive shock absorbers, intended to radically improve the performance of automotive suspension systems, absorbing bumps and road shock while controlling car body motions and sway.

In 2007, Bose was listed in Forbes 400 as the 271st richest man in the world, with a net worth of $1.8 billion. In 2009, he was no longer on the billionaires list, but returned to the list in 2011, with a net worth of $1.0 billion.

The company Bose founded employed 11,700 people worldwide as of 2016 and produces products for home, car, and professional audio, as well as conducting basic research in acoustics and other fields. Bose never took his company public, and given the company is privately held, Bose was able to pursue risky long-term research. In a 2004 interview in Popular Science magazine, he said: "I would have been fired a hundred times at a company run by MBAs. But I never went into business to make money. I went into business so that I could do interesting things that hadn't been done before."

Bose said that his best ideas usually came to him in a flash. "These innovations are not the result of rational thought, it's an intuitive idea."

== Personal life ==
He married Prema Bose but they later divorced. They had two children. Later in life, he married Ursula Bolthauser. Bose did not practice any religion, though he used to meditate for a short while every day. His son Vanu Bose was the founder and CEO of Vanu Inc., a software-defined radio technology company.

Bose died on July 12, 2013, at the age of 83 in Wayland, Massachusetts.

== Teaching and legacy ==
In addition to running his company, Bose remained a professor at MIT until 2001. He earned the Baker Teaching Award in 1963–64, and further teaching awards over the years. The Bose Award for Excellence in Teaching (1989), and later the Junior Bose Award (1995) were established in his honor, to recognize outstanding teaching in the MIT School of Engineering. Former students have stated that his classes helped them gain life skills and problem solving skills that have served them throughout their careers.

Bose was the doctoral advisor to MIT professor Alan V. Oppenheim, who is well known for his work on digital signal processing and his books on signals and systems. Oppenheim dedicated one of his books to Bose and described him with these words: "What I learned from him about teaching, research, and life over the many decades of our relationship affected me in ways too numerous to describe. He set the highest standards in everything that he did, and his accomplishments as a teacher, an inventor, and an entrepreneur are legendary."

In 2011, Bose donated a majority of the company's non-voting shares to MIT on the condition that the shares never be sold. Because these shares are non-voting, MIT does not participate in operations or governance of Bose Corporation.

== Honors and awards ==
- Fellow, IEEE, 1972 – for contributions to loudspeaker design, two-state amplifier-modulators, and nonlinear systems.
- Honorary member, Audio Engineering Society, 1985.
- Honorary Doctorate of Music from Berklee College of Music, 1994
- Bose was inducted into the National Inventors Hall of Fame in 2008.
- The 2010 IEEE/RSE Wolfson James Clerk Maxwell Award, for "outstanding contributions to consumer electronics in sound reproduction, industrial leadership, and engineering education".
- In 2011, he was listed at #9 on the MIT150 list of the top 150 innovators and ideas from MIT.
- Beryllium Lifetime Achievement Award, Association of Loudspeaker Manufacturing & Acoustics International, 2014.
- Founders Award at The Asian Awards 2015.
