= Hans Wilhelm Schüßler =

German telecommunications engineer

Hans Wilhelm Schüßler (February 28, 1928 – December 9, 2007) was a German telecommunications engineer, professor at the University of Erlangen-Nuremberg, an IEEE Fellow and a pioneer in communications systems and digital signal processing.

== Awards and honors ==
- Elected to IEEE Fellow (1977)
- Society Award of the IEEE Signal Processing Society (1979)
- IEEE Centennial Medal (1984)
- Basic Research Award, German Eduard Rhein Foundation (1993)
- IEEE Jack S. Kilby Signal Processing Medal (2003), for "his role in the early development of the field of Digital Signal Processing, especially the theory, design, and implementation of analog and digital filters."
