= Alan V. Oppenheim =

American professor

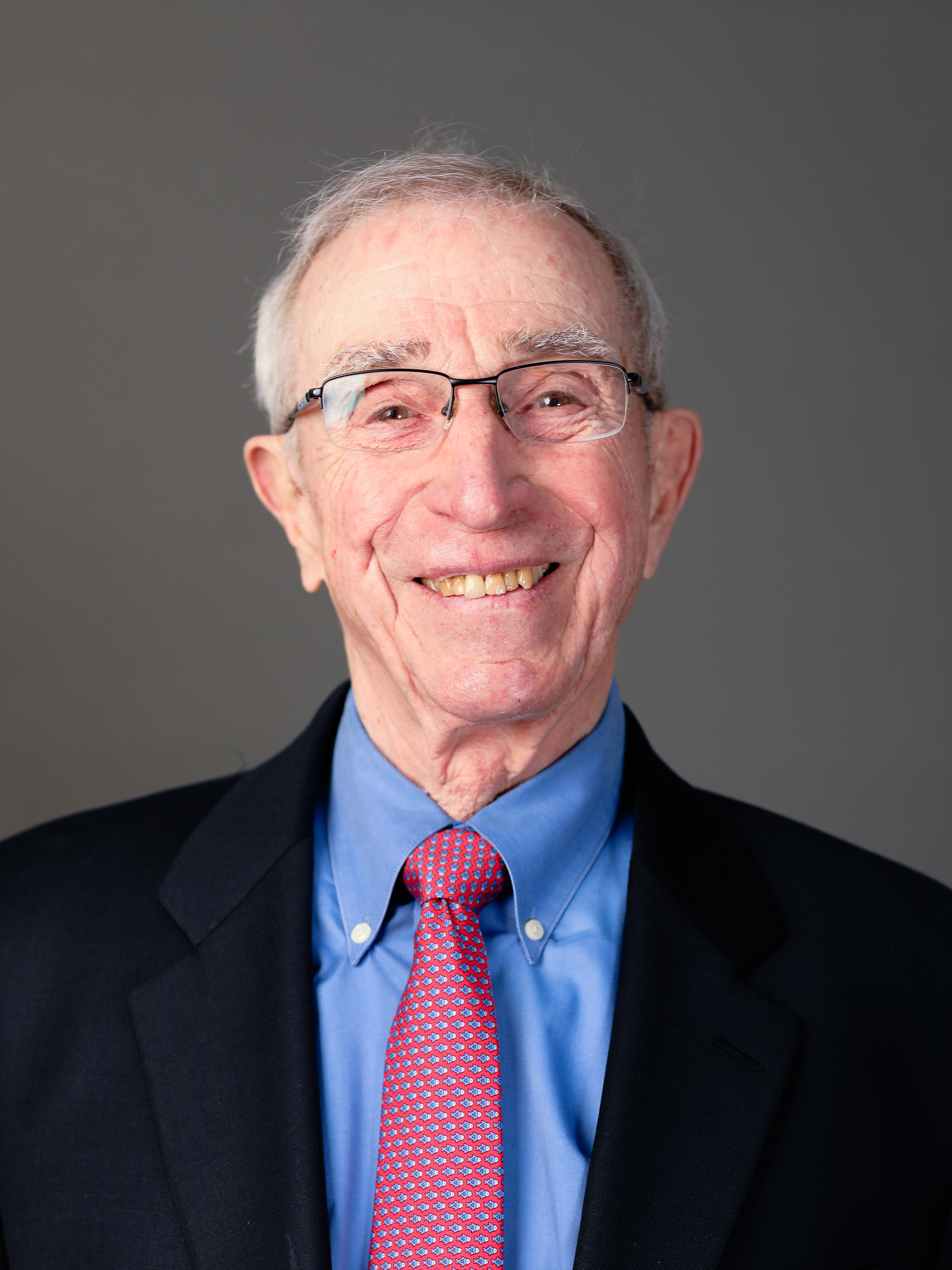
- Born: Alan Victor Oppenheim; 1937 (age 88–89); New York City, U.S.
- Education: Massachusetts Institute of Technology
- Known for: Digital signal processing
- Awards: IEEE Fellow (1977); IEEE Centennial Medal (1988); IEEE Education Medal (1988); Member of the National Academy of Engineering (1999); IEEE Jack S. Kilby Signal Processing Medal (2007)
- Scientific career
- Fields: Signal processing
- Workplaces: Massachusetts Institute of Technology; MIT Lincoln Laboratory; Woods Hole Oceanographic Institution
- Thesis: Superposition in a Class of Nonlinear Systems (1964)
- Doctoral advisor: Amar Bose
- Doctoral students: Yonina Eldar; Hamid Nawab; Thomas Francis Quatieri; Ronald W. Schafer; Avideh Zakhor

Alan Victor Oppenheim (born 1937) is a professor of engineering at MIT's Department of Electrical Engineering and Computer Science. He is also a principal investigator in MIT's Research Laboratory of Electronics (RLE), at the Digital Signal Processing Group.

His research interests are in the general area of signal processing and its applications. He is co-author of the widely used textbooks Discrete-Time Signal Processing and Signals and Systems. He is also the editor of several advanced books on signal processing.

== Education ==
Oppenheim received his B.S. and M.S. degrees simultaneously in 1961 and his D.Sc. degree in 1964, all in electrical engineering, from the Massachusetts Institute of Technology. His dissertation Superposition in a Class of Nonlinear Systems was written under the direction of Amar Bose. He is also the recipient of an honorary doctorate from Tel Aviv University (1995). In 1964, Oppenheim joined the faculty at MIT, where he is currently Ford Professor of Engineering and a MacVicar Faculty Fellow. Since 1967 he has been affiliated with MIT Lincoln Laboratory and since 1977 with the Woods Hole Oceanographic Institution.

== Affiliations and awards ==
Oppenheim was elected a member of the National Academy of Engineering for innovative research, writing of pioneering textbooks, and inspired teaching in the field of digital signal processing. He is a fellow of the IEEE, a member of Sigma Xi and ΗΚΝ. He has been a Guggenheim Fellow and a Sackler Fellow.

He has also received a number of awards for outstanding research and teaching, including the IEEE Centennial Medal (1984), the IEEE Education Medal (1988), the IEEE Third Millennium Medal (2000), the IEEE Jack S. Kilby Signal Processing Medal (2007), the Society Award, the Technical Achievement Award and the Senior Award of the IEEE Society on Acoustics, Speech and Signal Processing. He has also received a number of awards at MIT for excellence in teaching.

== Publications ==
Oppenheim is author or co-author of many books, including:

- Oppenheim, Alan V.; Schafer, R. W.; Buck, J. R. (1999). Discrete-time signal processing. Upper Saddle River, N.J.: Prentice Hall. ISBN 0-13-754920-2.
- Oppenheim, Alan V.; Willsky, Alan S.; Nawab, Hamid; with S. Hamid (1998). Signals and Systems. Pearson Education. ISBN 0-13-814757-4.
