= Zhi Tian =

Chinese-American electrical engineer

Zhi (Gerry) Tian is a Chinese and American electrical engineer, and a professor in the Department of Electrical and Computer Engineering at George Mason University. Her research interests include statistical signal processing, compressed sensing, cognitive radio, and localization in wireless sensor networks.

== Education and career ==
Tian received a bachelor's degree in electrical engineering and control theory from the University of Science and Technology of China in 1994. After a master's degree in control theory from Tsinghua University in 1995, she continued her studies at George Mason University, where she received a second master's degree in systems engineering in 1997 and completed a Ph.D. in information technology in 2000.

She joined Michigan Technological University as an assistant professor of electrical engineering in 2000; she was promoted to associate professor in 2005 and full professor in 2011. From 2011 to 2014 she took a leave from Michigan Tech to become a program director for the National Science Foundation, in its Communications, Circuits and Sensing Systems Program. In 2015 she returned to George Mason University as a professor.

== Recognition ==
Tian received a National Science Foundation CAREER Award in 2003. She was a distinguished lecturer of the IEEE for its Vehicular Technology Society from 2013 to 2017 and for its Communications Society from 2015 to 2016.

In 2012 she was named as an IEEE Fellow "for her contributions to ultra-wideband wireless communications and localization".
