= Jan Wilhelm Schüssler =

Norwegian show producer

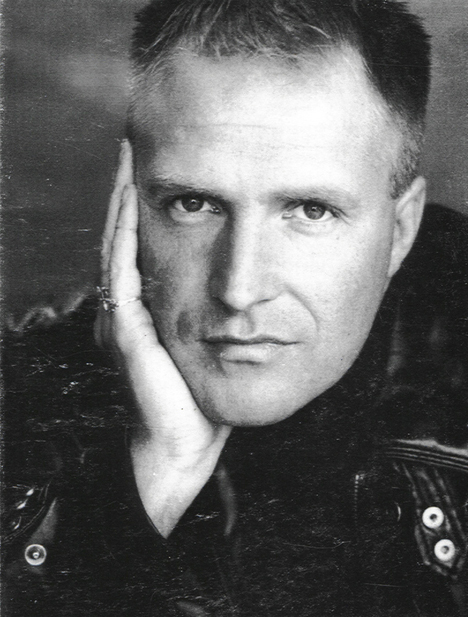
Jan W. Schüssler

Jan Wilhelm Schüssler (born 2 December 1965) is a Norwegian show producer, with both television, theatre, concerts and fashion shows to his credit.

Schüssler has produced and hosted the Oslo Fashion Awards Ceremony in Norway since 1991, but started his career as an actor and became a popular 80’s male super model in Paris, London, Hamburg, New York and Los Angeles. He was claimed by the prestigious fashion magazine "The Face" in 1985 to be “the most exciting male model in the UK”. The film script about Schüsslers model years was later developed by United Media in London.

For many years, Schüssler produced and hosted his own television series – “Artist Wall” (1989), “Moteekstra” (1989), “Trendmagazinet” (1990–1993), “Motejournalen” (1994) and “Moteguiden” (1995–1996). Schüssler also produced and co-hosted the live TV show “Olympic Aid” for Norwegian TV2 (1993), and the live TV show “Fashion Awards” for Norwegian TVN (2001).

Over the years, Schüssler has produced various concerts and theater productions, including the comedy cabaret show “Siste Skrik” (1993), the “Frigjøringsjubilékonserten” in Oslo (1995), the Wenche Myhre “One Woman Show” (1997) and “Pikkpreik” (2003). Schüssler also wrote and produced the 2005 Official Norwegian Independence Show “Hundreaarsvisningen 1905-2005” with the support of the Norwegian Ministry of Culture. As a producer and presenter, his merits include more than 1000 fashion shows.

Schüssler is the author of four books: “Kunsten å kle seg” (1995), “Kulturhaven” (2006), "Sentiment" (2013) and "Hiraeth - Tilbake til Oslo 1981" (2019). He has produced and hosted the Oslo Fashion Awards Ceremony in Norway since 1991. Schüssler is also a keen activist in the preservation of historic houses, and his private estate “Kulturhaven”, where he hosts annual classical concerts, consists of historic buildings from 1690-1859. Schüssler has two sons, Christian Frederick (born 1989) and Alexander Wilhelm (born 1992).
