= List of distinguished members of the Association for Computing Machinery =

ACM Distinguished Member
- Date: 2006
- Location: New York City
- Presented by: Association for Computing Machinery
- Website: awards.acm.org/distinguished-members

This article lists people who have been named ACM Distinguished Members, an award and membership granted by the Association for Computing Machinery (ACM) as its second highest honorary grade of membership only under that of ACM Fellow. The honor is reserved for the top 10% of ACM members "with at least 15 years of professional experience and 5 years of Professional Membership in the last 10 years who have achieved significant accomplishments or have made a significant impact on the computing field." Since 2006, the people that have been elected to the position are listed below:

== ACM Distinguished Members ==
=== 2006 ===
- Eric Allender
- George S. Avrunin
- David F. Bacon
- Henry Baker
- Reinaldo Bergamaschi
- Hans Boehm
- Ronald F. Boisvert
- Ramon Caceres
- Tracy Camp
- Larry Constantine
- Ruth E. Davis
- R. Kent Dybvig
- Jo Ebergen
- Alan D. Fekete
- Michael Franz
- Maria L. Gini
- Michael T. Goodrich
- Laura S. Hill
- Sandra K. Johnson
- Richard Jones
- Joseph A. Konstan
- Susan Landau
- Robert M. Lefkowitz
- Timothe Litt
- Kathryn S. McKinley
- Jonh Nolan
- Dianne P. O'Leary
- Charles C. Palmer
- Elaine R. Palmer
- Jan Pedersen
- Susan Rodger
- Holly E. Rushmeier
- Vivek Sarkar
- Robert Schreiber
- Stuart C. Shapiro
- Arun K. Somani
- David (Dave) Andrew Thomas
- John A. Tomlin
- David S. Touretzky
- Gregory S. Tseytin
- David M. Ungar
- Guido van Rossum
- Christopher A. Vick
- Robert A. Walker
- Mario Wolczko
- Michael F. Worboys
- Shumin Zhai
- Feng Zhao
- Albert Zomaya

=== 2007 ===
- Andrea L. Ames
- Michael Burke
- Siddhartha Chatterjee
- John R. Douceur
- Nikil D. Dutt
- Matthew B. Dwyer
- Kathleen S. Fisher
- Richard Furuta
- Gregory Ganger
- Lane Hemaspaandra
- Chao-Ju Hou
- David J. Kasik
- Toshio Nakatani
- Ragunathan Rajkumar
- John T. Riedl
- Marybeth Rosson
- Michael Schlansker
- Subhash Suri
- Stephen Trimberger
- Fei-Yue Wang

=== 2008 ===
- David Belanger
- Brian A. Berenbach
- Douglas C. Burger
- Murray Campbell
- Krishnendu Chakrabarty
- Yih-Farn Robin Chen
- Jen-Yao Chung
- James R. Cordy
- Ernesto Damiani
- Susan Dray
- Tim Duval
- Andreas Girgensohn
- Jerrold M. Grochow
- Robert J. Hall
- Hermann Kaindl
- Craig Knoblock
- Donald H. Kraft
- Mike A. Marin
- Arif Merchant
- Dejan S. Milojicic
- Marc Najork
- Mitsunori Ogihara
- Massoud Pedram
- Frederick E. Petry
- Vir V. Phoha
- Vincenzo Piuri
- Paul Purdom
- Dragomir R. Radev
- Louiqa Raschid
- Debanjan Saha
- Jeffrey Shallit
- Pradip Srimani
- Mark A. Stalzer
- Frank Tip
- Michael Waidner
- Richard C. Waters
- Daniel S. Whelan

=== 2009 ===
- Eric Allman
- Ana I. Anton
- Lars Arge
- Jay S. Bayne
- Mordechai Ben-Ari
- Kellogg S. Booth
- Christian Cachin
- Martin C. Carlisle
- Ludmila Cherkasova
- Tom Cormen
- Mark Crovella
- Mary P. Czerwinski
- Sunil R. Das
- Carlos J. P. De Lucena
- Suzanne W. Dietrich
- Laura Dillon
- Richard P. Draves
- Schahram Dustdar
- Keith Edwards
- Carla S. Ellis
- Ahmed Elmagarmid
- Sally Fincher
- Robert M. Geist
- Tyrone Grandison
- Rebecca E. Grinter
- Manish Gupta
- Jayant R. Haritsa
- Bruce Hendrickson
- Michael A. Heroux
- Michael Hind
- Mamdouh H. Ibrahim
- Mikhail Ignatyev
- John Karat
- J. Kaufman
- Stefanos Kaxiras
- Charles Kelemen
- Andras Kornai
- Jeffrey Kreulen
- Ajay Kshemkalyani
- Tok Wang Ling
- Jorge Lobo
- Anna Lubiw
- Rao Mannepalli
- James F. McGill
- Nancy R. Mead
- Dwight Meglan
- Jim Melton
- Milan Milenkovic
- Jose E. Moreira
- Shubu Mukherjee
- Inderpal Singh Mumick
- Ngoc Thanh Nguyen
- Brian Novack
- Harold Ossher
- Venkata Padmanabhan
- Fabio Paterno
- Ramon C. Puigjaner
- Naren Ramakrishnan
- Ganesan Ramalingam
- Yong Rui
- Pierangela Samarati
- Cyrus Shahabi
- Sol Shatz
- Prashant J. Shenoy
- Frank Shipman
- Peretz Shoval
- Liuba Shrira
- Pradeep Sinha
- Bryan F. Smith
- Vugranam C. Sreedhar
- Paul A. Strassmann
- Peter Stuckey
- Loren Terveen
- Will Tracz
- Ron van der Meyden
- Ellen M. Voorhees
- Henry Walker
- David Whalley
- Allen E. Wirfs-Brock
- Edward Pearce Wobber
- Chengxiang Zhai
- Liang-Jie Zhang
- Michelle Zhou

=== 2010 ===
- Divyakant Agrawal
- Mark S. Anderson
- Martin Arlitt
- Vasanth Bala
- Malworsth Brian Blake
- Doug A. Bowman
- Panos K. Chrysanthis
- Elizabeth Frances Churchill
- Donald D. Cowan
- Evelyn Duesterwald
- Abdulmotaleb El Saddik
- Serge Fdida
- Wuchun Feng
- Liana L. Fong
- Juan E. Gilbert
- David Paul Grove
- Mary W. Hall
- Yu Charlie Hu
- Shivkumar Kalyanaraman
- Huan Liu
- Wei-Ying Ma
- Yoelle Maarek
- Paul P. Maglio
- Dino Mandrioli
- Tshilidzi Marwala
- Gail C. Murphy
- Hwee Tou Ng
- Linda M. Northrop
- Lori L. Pollock
- Ramachandran Ramjee
- Steven K. Reinhardt
- Andrew L. Sears
- Joel Seiferas
- Shiuhpyng Shieh
- Anand Sivasubramaniam
- Kevin Skadron
- Bhavani Thuraisingham
- Walter F. Tichy
- Joseph D. Touch
- Carl A. Waldspurger
- C. Daniel Wolfson
- Alec Wolman
- Andrew Woo
- Kesheng Wu
- Jun Xu
- Mohammed Zaki
- Hai Zhuge

=== 2011 ===
- Krste Asanovic
- Benjamin B. Bederson
- Elizabeth Belding
- Ricardo Bianchini
- Steve Blackburn
- Aaron F. Bobick
- Upen S. Chakravarthy
- Satish Chandra
- Jyh-Cheng Chen
- Shu-Ching Chen
- Ingemar J. Cox
- Dilma M. Da Silva
- Marie desJardins
- Martin Dietzfelbinger
- Elena Ferrari
- Stephen Fink
- Patrick J. Flynn
- Armando Fox
- Minos Garofalakis
- Michael L. Gleicher
- Amarnath Gupta
- John Impagliazzo
- Clare-Marie N. Karat
- Tamara G. Kolda
- Michael Kolling
- Kang-Won Lee
- Sung-Ju Lee
- Chih-Jen Lin
- Jie Liu
- Cristina Videira Lopes
- Diana Marculescu
- Aaron Marcus
- Igor L. Markov
- Michael Mascagni
- David Millen
- Mukesh Kumar Mohania
- Frank Mueller
- Robert L. Nord
- Jignesh M. Patel
- Richard Pattis
- Li-Shiuan Peh
- Balakrishnan Prabhakaran
- Kari-Jouko Raiha
- Parthasarathy Ranganathan
- David F. Redmiles
- Puneet Sharma
- John Stasko
- Shari Trewin
- Mark Weiss
- Laurie Ann Williams
- Robert Wisniewski
- Qiang Yang
- Yuanyuan Zhou
- Benjamin G. Zorn

=== 2012 ===
- Joel Adams
- Nancy M. Amato
- Ruth Iris Bahar
- E. Wes Bethel
- Barbara Boucher Owens
- Athman Bouguettaya
- Ian Brown
- Kasim Selcuk Candan
- Lillian N. Cassel
- Naehyuck Chang
- Chen-Nee Chuah
- Steve Cooper
- Wanda Dann
- Murthy Devarakonda
- Ken Fast
- Evgeniy Gabrilovich
- Dan Garcia
- Michel Hack
- Wendi Beth Heinzelman
- Antony Hosking
- Daniel A. Jimenez
- Kimberly Keeton
- Angelos Dennis Keromytis
- Latifur R. Khan
- Ninghui Li
- Joseph P. Loyall
- Maged M. Michael
- Michael Muller
- Erich M. Nahum
- Torben Bach Pedersen
- Vijay V. Raghavan
- Sudipta Sengupta
- Sandeep Kumar Shukla
- Mei-Ling Shyu
- Peter F. Sweeney
- Peri Tarr
- Jeffrey S. Vetter
- Jennifer L. Welch
- Changsheng Xu
- Franco Zambonelli
- Wenwu Zhu

=== 2013 ===
- Owen Astrachan
- Saurabh Bagchi
- Michael E. Caspersen
- Rong Chang
- Fred Chong
- Graham R. Cormode
- James Cownie
- Prasad M. Deshpande
- Maria R. Ebling
- Marcus F. Fontoura
- Mark Giesbrecht
- Takahiro Hara
- Tobias Hollerer
- Doug Jacobson
- Vanja Josifovski
- Guenter Karjoth
- Terence Kelly
- Tsvi Kuflik
- Yung-Hsiang Lu
- Jock Mackinlay
- Sriganesh Madhvanath
- Filippo Menczer
- Ethan L. Miller
- T. M. Murali
- Thomas L. Naps
- Jitendra Padhye
- Sushil K. Prasad
- Lili Qiu
- Gregg E. Rothermel
- Paolo Santi
- Ray Simar
- Evgenia Smirni
- Geoffrey Seward Smith
- Il-Yeol Song
- Eswaran Subrahmanian
- André van der Hoek
- Patrick H. Worley
- Michael Young
- Zhi-Hua Zhou
- Qiang Zhu

=== 2014 ===
- Jose NelsonAmaral
- Paul Barford
- Clark Barrett
- Patrick Baudisch
- Valeria M. Bertacco
- Judith Bishopf
- Martin Burtscher
- Danny Z. Chen
- Jianer Chen
- Ed H. Chi
- Allison Druin
- Stephen H. Edwards
- Matthew Flatt
- Silvia Giordano
- Ganesh Gopalakrishnan
- Jeff Gray
- Marco Oliver Gruteser
- Mark Guzdial
- Lynda Hardman
- Simon Harper
- Ahmed Helmy
- Kristina Hook
- Thomas Hou
- Ihab F. Ilyas
- Somesh Jha
- David R. Kaeli
- Gabriele Kotsis
- Li Erran Li
- Xiangyang Li
- Jason Liu
- Dmitri Loguinov
- Gabriel H. Loh
- Robyn Lutz
- Tamiya Onodera
- Manish Parashar
- Sreeranga P. Rajan
- Nitendra Rajput
- Lawrence Rauchwerger
- Binoy Ravindran
- Tim Sherwood
- Rajeev Shorey
- Krishna M. Sivalingam
- Mike Spreitzer
- Biplav Srivastava
- Miroslav N. Velev
- Duncan M. Walker
- Kevin D. Wayne
- Hui Xiong
- Lenore Zuck

=== 2015 ===
- Ashraf Aboulnaga
- Gail-Joon Ahn
- N. Asokan
- Stefano Basagni
- Jayanta Basak
- James Begole
- Rajesh R. Bordawekar
- Nicholas S. Bowen
- Margaret Burnett
- Charles L. A. Clarke
- James Davis
- Donald Firesmith
- George Forman
- Andrei Gurtov
- Carl Gutwin
- Hakan Hacigumus
- Elizabeth K. Hawthorne
- Aaron Hertzmann
- Martin Johannes Hirzel
- Xian-Sheng Hua
- Warren Alva Hunt
- Graham Hutton
- Kiyokuni Kawachiya
- Hang Li
- Xuelong Li
- Chang-Tien Lu
- Ratul Mahajan
- Nenad Medvidović
- Prabhat Mishra
- Nachiappan Nagappan
- Walid Najjar
- Amit Anil Nanavati
- Nuria Oliver
- Konstantina Papagiannaki
- Ian Parberry
- Cynthia A. Phillips
- Ali Pinar
- Ravi Ramamoorthi
- Nalini Ratha
- Joerg Sander
- Adrian Sandu
- Clifford A. Shaffer
- Leonel Sousa
- Michela Taufer
- Sebastian Uchitel
- Jaideep Vaidya
- Tao Xie
- Moustafa A. Youssef
- Ben Y. Zhao

=== 2016 ===
- Joanne Marie Atlee
- Sonia Bergamaschi
- Raheem Abdul Beyah
- Tevfik Bultan
- David Carmel
- Shigang Chen
- Otfried Cheong
- Shing-Chi Cheung
- Michael J. Clancy
- Matthew L. Cooper
- Michelle Craig
- Alberto Del Bimbo
- Josep Domingo-Ferrer
- Rudra Dutta
- Sebastian Elbaum
- Geraldine Fitzpatrick
- Hubertus Franke
- Emden R. Gansner
- Zhenjiang Hu
- Gang Hua
- Pan Hui
- Katherine Isbister
- Venugopal K.R.
- Murat Kantarcioglu
- Fabio Kon
- Amruth N. Kumar
- Laks Lakshmanan
- Tie-Yan Liu
- Stefano Lonardi
- Heiko Ludwig
- Sanjay Madria
- Jacquelyn Martino
- Tao Mei
- Suman Nath
- George Necula
- Chong-Wah NGO
- Corina S. Pasareanu
- Marian Petre
- David Ayman Shamma
- Weisong Shi
- Prasun Sinha
- Darko Stefanovic
- Yufei Tao
- Shuicheng Yan
- Yu Zheng

=== 2017 ===
- Sharad Agarwal
- Srinivas Aluru
- Sihem Amer-Yahia
- David Atienza Alonso
- Winslow Burleson
- Kirk Cameron
- Jiannong Cao
- Gail Chapman
- Siu-Wing Cheng
- Chris Clifton
- Myra B. Cohen
- James H. Cross
- Ian Goldberg
- Cay Horstmann
- Xiangji Huang
- Matt Huenerfauth
- Joaquim Jorge
- James Joshi
- Wessel Kraaij
- Vijay Kumar
- Ashish Kundu
- Hai Li
- Renee McCauley
- Qiaozhu Mei
- Mohamed F. Mokbel
- Meredith Ringel Morris
- Sam H. Noh
- John Douglas Owens
- Lynne E. Parker
- Mauro Pezzè
- Lucian Popa
- Hridesh Rajan
- Kui Ren
- Kenneth M. Salem
- Theo Ezell Schlossnagle
- Judithe Sheard
- Jean Vanderdonckt
- Willem C. Visser
- Rebecca N. Wright
- Cathy H. Wu
- Dong Yu
- Roger Zimmermann
- Thomas Zimmermann

=== 2018 ===
- Eytan Adar
- Christine Alvarado
- Sven Apel
- Brian Bailey
- Rajesh Balan
- Suman Banerjee
- Tim Bell
- Emery David Berger
- Yi Chang
- Marsha Chechik
- Lei Chen
- Yiran Chen
- Tanzeem Choudhury
- Mats Daniels
- Xin Luna Dong
- Falko Dressler
- Niklas Elmqvist
- Natalie Enright Jerger
- Yun Raymond Fu
- Deepak Ganesan
- Jennifer Golbeck
- Indranil Gupta
- Vasant G. Honavar
- Kazuaki Ishizaki
- Xiaohua Jia
- Judy Kay
- Rajkumar Kettimuthu
- David Kotz
- Cliff Lampe
- Kevin Leyton-Brown
- Chen Li
- Feifei Li
- Andrew McGettrick
- Gonzalo Navarro
- Srihari Nelakuditi
- Dimitrios Nikolopoulos
- Tetsuya Sakai
- Stefan Saroiu
- Xipeng Shen
- Ram D. Sriram
- Lynn Andrea Stein
- Chris Stephenson
- Karthikeyan Sundaresan
- Jaime Teevan
- Renata Teixeira
- Jingdong Wang
- Merrill Warkentin
- Danfeng Yao
- Yizhou Yu

=== 2019 ===
- Mary Gray Baker
- Valerie Barr
- Andrew B. Begel
- Mark Berman
- Eric Bodden
- Susanne Boll
- Oliver Brdiczka
- Kim B. Bruce
- Yuriy Brun
- Ali R. Butt
- Haibo Chen
- Adam Chlipala
- Thomas Cortina
- Landon Cox
- Weidong Cui
- Andrea Danyluk
- Roberto Di Pietro
- Gavin Doherty
- Guofei Gu
- Minyi Guo
- Zhu Han
- Tsung-Yi Ho
- Steven Chu Hong Hoi
- Yan Huang
- Jeffrey A. Johnson
- Karrie Karahalios
- Florian Kerschbaum
- Irwin King
- Benjamin Lee
- Dongwon Lee
- Mo Li
- Alex X. Liu
- David Lo
- Pinyan Lu
- Shan Lu
- Mahesh Marina
- Kameshwar Munagala
- Mark Webster Newman
- Fatma Özcan
- Dario Pompili
- Konstantinos Psounis
- Manuel A. Pérez-Quiñones
- Meikang Qiu
- Chandan K. Reddy
- Martin Reddy
- Shourya Roy
- Mehran Sahami
- Amber Settle
- Heng Tao Shen
- Luo Si
- Manu Sridharan
- Hari Sundaram
- Jian Tang
- Stephanie Teasley
- Jodi L. Tims
- Vincent Shin-Mu Tseng
- Charles Weems
- Joerg Widmer
- Xing Xie
- Li Xiong
- Jun Yang
- Haitao Zheng

=== 2020 ===
- Nael Abu-Ghazaleh
- Fan Bai
- Pavan Balaji
- Jernej Barbic
- Tiffany Barnes
- Michael A. Bender
- Christian Bird
- Daniel Boley
- Eric W. Burger
- Longbing Cao
- Carlos A. Castillo
- Pablo Cesar
- Hao Chen
- Minghua Chen
- Albert Cheng
- Wen-Huang Cheng
- Kevyn Collins-Thompson
- Cristina Conati
- Peng Cui
- Josiah Dykstra
- Barbara Jane Ericson
- Maribel Fernandez
- Vladimir Filkov
- Jianfeng Gao
- Song Guo
- Ashish Gupta
- Tracy Anne Hammond
- Gillian Hayes
- Bingsheng He
- Qi He
- Sun-Yuan Hsieh
- Adriana Iamnitchi
- Shuiwang Ji
- Julie Kientz
- Deepak Kumar
- Yunyao Li
- Xue (Steve) Liu
- Yan Liu
- Alessio R. Lomuscio
- Xiaosong Ma
- Ashwin Machanavajjhala
- Andrew McGregor
- Sharad Mehrotra
- Samuel Pratt Midkiff
- Sudip Misra
- Jeffrey Nichols
- Alessandro Orso
- Panagiotis Papadimitratos
- Sudeep Pasricha
- Aaron Quigley
- Abhik Roychoudhury
- Sourav S. Bhowmick
- Anees Shaikh
- Yuanyuan Tian
- Hanghang Tong
- Gloria Childress Townsend
- Anil Vullikanti
- Yu Wang
- De-Nian Yang
- Laurence T. Yang
- Jieping Ye
- Fung Yu Young
- Hongyu Zhang
- Lintao Zhang

=== 2021 ===
- Bo An
- Cecilia Aragon
- Marcelo Arenas
- Rosa M. Badia
- Ranjita Bhagwan
- Richard Brooks
- Cristian Cadar
- Supratik Chakraborty
- Jake Chen
- Yingying Chen
- Alison Lynne Clear
- Zhigang Deng
- Tawanna Dillahunt
- Rolf Drechsler
- Xiaojiang Du
- Ashutosh Dutta
- Kathi Fisler
- Andrea Forte
- Marcus Foth
- Xiaoming Fu
- Ramaswamy Govindarajan
- M. Shamim Hossain
- Trent Jaeger
- Irena Kemelmacher-Shlizerman
- Miryung Kim
- Ponnurangam Kumaraguru
- Jerry Chun-Wei Lin
- Yiqun Liu
- Andrew Luxton-Reilly
- Ujjwal Maulik
- Donald Arthur Metzler
- Archan Misra
- Antonija Mitrovićf
- Max E. Muhlhauser
- Sean Munson
- Felix Naumann
- Edmund B. Nightingale
- Karthik Pattabiraman
- Leo Porter
- Jane C. Prey
- Guo-Jun Qi
- M. Sohel Rahman
- Sanjay Rao
- Balaraman Ravindran
- Knut Risvik
- Ingrid F. Russell
- M.C. Schraefel
- Katie A. Siek
- Yogesh Simmhan
- Sriram Subramanian
- Lin Tan
- Nalini Venkatasubramanian
- Fei Wang
- XiaoFeng Wang
- Yusu Wang
- Ingmar Weber
- Yonggang Wen
- Jie Wu
- Xiaokui Xiao
- Chun Jason Xue
- Ke Yi
- Jingyi Yu
- Erez Zadok

=== 2022 ===
- Vijayalakshmi Atluri
- Earl Theodore Barr
- Michael Bendersky
- Matthew A. Bishop
- Nirupama Bulusu
- Barbara Carminati
- Enhong Chen
- Rada Chirkova
- Tony G. Clear
- David Crandall
- Quintin I. Cutts
- Khuzaima Daudjee
- Yu Deng
- Kaoutar El Maghraoui
- Diana Marie Franklin
- Dragan Gasevic
- Christopher D. Gill
- Dimitris Gizopoulos
- Margaret Hamilton
- Dan Hao
- Ehsan Hoque
- Longbo Huang
- Shadi Ibrahim
- Salil Kanhere
- Samee U. Khan
- Milind Kulkarni
- Matt Lease
- Jing Li
- Shoude Lin
- Zhiqiang Lin
- Silvia Lindtner
- Shixia Liu
- Xuanzhe Liu
- Siwei Lyu
- Zhuoqing Mao
- Athina Markopoulou
- Wim Martens
- Joanna McGrenere
- Gerome Miklau
- Tijana Milenkovic
- Animesh Mukherjee
- Kedar Namjoshi
- Thomas Ploetz
- Michael Pradel
- Qinru Qiu
- Reza Rejaie
- Martin Robillard
- Jennifer Ann Rode
- Guido Roessling
- Saket Saurabh
- Chirag Shah
- Haiying Shen
- Li Shen
- Georgios Smaragdakis
- Houbing Herbert Song
- Yizhou Sun
- Nian-Feng Tzeng
- Kaisa Vaananen
- Haining Wang
- Xuanhui Wang
- Harry Guoqing Xu
- Kun Yang
- Koji Yatani
- Joseph W. Yoder
- Ayal Zaks
- Zibin Zheng
- Jianying Zhou

=== 2023 ===
- Murali Annavaram
- Vijay Arya
- Pernille Bjorn
- Kai Chen
- Reynold Cheng
- Carla Fabiana Chiasserini
- Mauro Conti
- Sanmay Das
- Jeff Forbes
- Auroop Ratan Ganguly
- Floris Geerts
- Werner Geyer
- Roberto Giacobazzi
- Eric Gilbert
- Daniel Grosu
- Boris Grot
- Tao Gu
- Jingrui He
- Eva Hornecker
- Christopher Hundhausen
- Kyle Jamieson
- Shaun K. Kane
- Jofish Kaye
- Amy J. Ko
- Oren Kurland
- Yang Li
- Yun Liang
- Lauri Malmi
- Tommaso Melodia
- Ishai Menache
- Anders Moeller
- Briana Morrison
- Santosh G. Nagarakatte
- Arnab Nandi
- Michael E. Papka
- Mathias Payer
- Sean Peisert
- Denys Poshyvanyk
- Amir Rahmani
- Amanda Randles
- Lionel P. Robert
- Dario Rossi
- Sudeep Sarkar
- Yan Solihin
- Nesime Tatbul
- Nicola Tonellotto
- Daniel Vogel
- Dan Wang
- Adam Wierman
- Lauren Wilcox
- Chang Xu
- Meihui Zhang

=== 2024 ===
- Alessandro Abate
- Pavan Aduri
- Brett A. Becker
- Ali C. Begen
- Marina Blanton
- Nicolas Bruno
- Zhipeng Cai
- Meeyoung Cha
- Rong Chen
- Yunan Chen
- Kaushik Chowdhury
- Gao Cong
- Emiliano De Cristofaro
- Constantine Dovrolis
- Magy Seif El-Nasr
- Nicole Ellison
- Song Fu
- Shahram Ghandeharizadeh
- Sreenivas Gollapudi
- Mohamed Hefeeda
- Zi Helen Huang
- Tao Ju
- Eren Kurshan
- Zhouchen Lin
- Stephanie Ludi
- Qiong Luo
- Xiapu Luo
- Kim Marriott
- Cecilia Mascolo
- Bradley N. Miller
- Prateek Mittal
- Hung Ngo
- Chunyi Peng
- Andrew K. Petersen
- Venkatesh B. Radhakrishnan
- Md Saidur Rahman
- Selma Sabanovic
- Florian Schaub
- Johannes Schoening
- Kelly Shaw
- Simon
- Elena Simperl
- Richa Singh
- Gang Tan
- Jeffrey M. Voas
- Yu Wang
- Allison Woodruff
- Chuan Wu
- Xin Xia
- Yingfei Xiong
- Shouhuai Xu
- Dawei Yin
- Minlan Yu
- Lingming Zhang
- Min Zhang
- Yinqian Zhang

=== 2025 ===
- Ahmed Abbasi
- Rajeev Balasubramonian
- Pablo Barcelo
- Shaowen Bardzell
- Marcel Boehme
- Aydin Buluc
- Jianfei Cai
- Jennifer Campbell
- Eun Kyoung Choe
- Rumi Chunara
- Nick Craswell
- Shaundra Bryant Daily
- Munmun De Choudhury
- Paul Denny
- Sheng Di
- Janardhan Rao Doppa
- Tiago Guerreiro
- Brent Hecht
- Reid Holmes
- Sanjay Kumar Jha
- Daxin Jiang
- Yu-Gang Jiang
- Craig S. Kaplan
- Dimitrios Koutsonikolas
- Shuvendu Kumar Lahiri
- Hady W. Lauw
- Bongshin Lee
- Sian E. Lindley
- Jacob R. Lorch
- Kurt Luther
- Jose F. Martinez
- Alexandra Meliou
- Florian Mueller
- Mor Naaman
- Tze Sing Eugene Ng
- Edith Cheuk Han Ngai
- Bogdan Nicolae
- Dan Olteanu
- Partha Pande
- Sergio Rajsbaum
- Daniel Mauricio Romero
- Smruti Ranjan Sarangi
- Corina Sas
- Sarita Schoenebeck
- Weiyi Shang
- Philip Shilane
- Robert Soule
- Nan Tang
- Jan Vahrenhold
- Jan Van Den Bussche
- Jessica Vitak
- Huamin Wang
- Alicia Nicki Washington
- Julie R. Williamson
- Yubin Xia
- Sung-Eui Yoon
- Junsong Yuan
- Mi Zhang
- Rui Zhang
- Ying Zhang
- Lei Zou
