= Conati =

Conati is an Italian surname. Notable people with the surname include:

- Cristina Conati, Italian and Canadian computer scientist
- Gianfranco Conati, Italian soldier in World War II, captain of 8th Paratroopers Engineers Regiment (Italy)
- Luciano Conati (1950–2016), Italian cyclist
