= Bertacco =

Bertacco is an Italian surname.

== List of people with the surname ==
- Stefano Bertacco (1962–2020), Italian politician
- Valeria Bertacco, American academic

== See also ==
- Berta Collado
