= Dustdar =

Dustdar is a surname. Notable people with the surname include:

- Aramesh Dustdar (1931–2021), Iranian philosopher, writer, and scholar
- Schahram Dustdar, Austrian computer scientist
- Ehsanollah Khan Dustdar (1884–1939), Iranian activist and political activist executed in Moscow
