= Jiannong Cao =

Researcher

- 曹建农
- Education: Washington State University, Nanjing University
- Awards: ACM Distinguished Member
- Scientific career
- Workplaces: The Hong Kong Polytechnic University
- Website: https://www.comp.polyu.edu.hk/~csjcao/

Jiannong Cao is a Hong Kong computer scientist researching distributed computing, parallel computing, pervasive computing, mobile computing, and wireless networking. He is an IEEE fellow, the chair professor at Department of Computing, Faculty of Engineering at Hong Kong Polytechnic University. He was the head of Department of Computing at Hong Kong Polytechnic University. He is also the director of PolyU Internet and Mobile Computing Lab.

Cao is the author of many books about computer science, including "Parallel and Distributed Processing and Applications" and "Wireless Sensor Networks for Structural Health Monitoring". In 2017, Cao became an ACM Distinguished Member.
