= Ahmed Abbasi =

Artificial intelligence researchers

- Education: University of Arizona; Columbia University; Virginia Tech
- Scientific career
- Fields: Information systems, artificial intelligence, machine learning, natural language processing, business analytics
- Institutions: University of Notre Dame

Ahmed Abbasi is an information systems scholar and professor at the University of Notre Dame. He holds the Joe and Jane Giovanini Professorship in IT, Analytics, and Operations at the Mendoza College of Business and serves as director of the Lucy Family Institute for Data & Society and deputy director of the university’s Data, AI, and Computing Initiative.

== Education ==
Abbasi earned a B.S. in Information Technology and Management Science and an M.B.A. with a concentration in Information Technology from Virginia Tech. He received an M.S. in Operations Research from Columbia University and a Ph.D. in Information Systems, with a minor in cognitive science, from the University of Arizona's Artificial Intelligence Lab. His doctoral adviser was Hsinchun Chen.

== Career ==
From 2004 to 2008, Abbasi was a research associate and project lead in the Artificial Intelligence Lab at the University of Arizona. He was an assistant professor of management information systems at the University of Wisconsin–Milwaukee from 2008 to 2011.

Abbasi joined the McIntire School of Commerce at the University of Virginia in 2011, where he later served as Murray Research Endowed Chair Professor of Information Technology and associate dean. He also directed the Center for Business Analytics from 2013 to 2020.

In 2020, Abbasi joined the University of Notre Dame as the Joe and Jane Giovanini Endowed Chair Professor in the Department of IT, Analytics, and Operations at the Mendoza College of Business. He became co-director of the Human-centered Analytics Lab in 2020 and director of the Analytics Ph.D. Program in 2021. In 2026, he was appointed director of the Lucy Family Institute for Data & Society and deputy director of the Data, AI, and Computing Initiative.

== Awards and honors ==
- 2010 – MIS Quarterly Paper of the Year, for "Detecting Fake Websites: The Contribution of Statistical Learning Theory"
- 2011 – Best Information Systems Publications Award, Association for Information Systems
- 2014 – Senior Member of the IEEE
- 2019 – Information Systems Society Design Science Award, Institute for Operations Research and the Management Sciences
- 2021 – Information Systems Research Best Paper Award, INFORMS
- 2025 – All-Faculty Team Award, University of Notre Dame
- 2025 – ACM Distinguished Member
- 2025 – Information Systems Society Distinguished Fellow Award, Institute for Operations Research and the Management Sciences
- 2026 – IEEE Big Data Security Senior Research Award

== Selected publications ==
- Abbasi, Ahmed; Chen, Hsinchun (2008). "CyberGate: A Design Framework and System for Text Analysis of Computer Mediated Communication". MIS Quarterly. 32 (4): 811–837.
- Abbasi, Ahmed; Chen, Hsinchun (2008). "Writeprints: A Stylometric Approach to Identity-Level Identification and Similarity Detection in Cyberspace". ACM Transactions on Information Systems. 26 (2): 1–29.
- Abbasi, Ahmed; Zhang, Zhu; Zimbra, David; Chen, Hsinchun; Nunamaker, Jay F. Jr. (2010). "Detecting Fake Websites: The Contribution of Statistical Learning Theory". MIS Quarterly. 34 (3): 435–461.
- Abbasi, Ahmed; Albrecht, Chad C.; Vance, Anthony; Hansen, James V. (2012). "MetaFraud: A Meta-learning Framework for Detecting Financial Fraud". MIS Quarterly. 36 (4): 1293–1327.
- Abbasi, Ahmed; Zhou, Yilu; Deng, Shasha; Zhang, Pengzhu (2018). "Text Analytics to Support Sense-making in Social Media: A Language-Action Perspective". MIS Quarterly. 42 (2): 427–464.
- Abbasi, Ahmed; Li, Jingjing; Adjeroh, Donald; Abate, Mary; Zheng, Wei (2019). "Don't Mention It? Analyzing User-generated Content Signals for Early Adverse Event Warnings". Information Systems Research. 30 (3): 1007–1028.
- Abbasi, Ahmed; Dobolyi, David; Vance, Anthony; Zahedi, Fatemeh Mariam (2021). "The Phishing Funnel Model: A Design Artifact to Predict User Susceptibility to Phishing Websites". Information Systems Research. 32 (2): 410–436.
- Abbasi, Ahmed; Chiang, Roger H. L.; Xu, Jennifer (2023). "Data Science for Social Good". Journal of the Association for Information Systems. 24 (6): 1439–1458.
- Abbasi, Ahmed; Parsons, Jeffrey; Pant, Gautam; Sheng, Olivia; Sarker, Saonee (2024). "Pathways for Design Research on Artificial Intelligence". Information Systems Research. 35 (2): 441–459.
- Abbasi, Ahmed; Somanchi, Sriram; Kelley, Ken (2025). "The Critical Challenge of Using Large-scale Digital Experiment Platforms for Scientific Discovery". MIS Quarterly. 49 (1): 1–28.
