= Nalini Venkatasubramanian =

Indian computer scientist

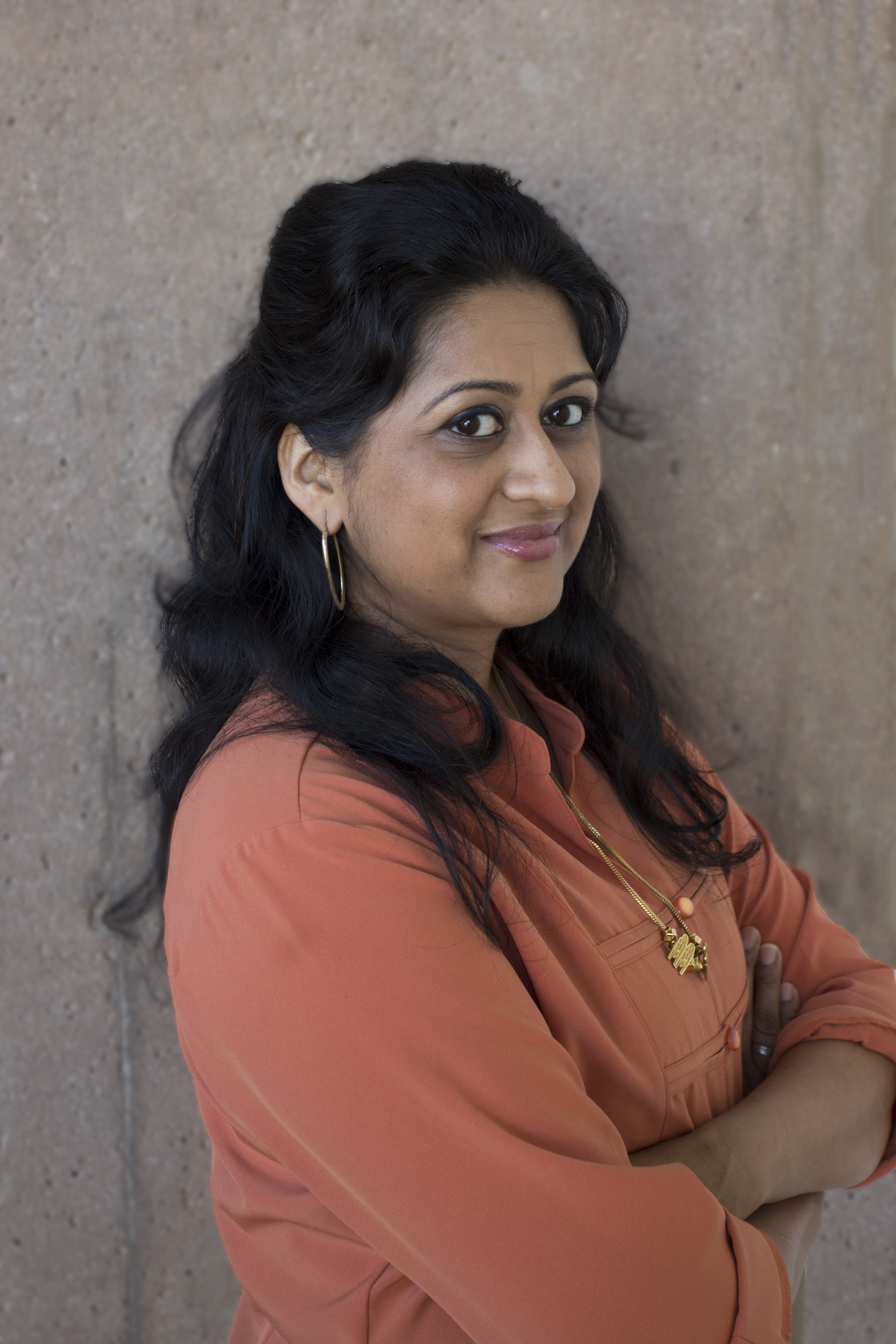
Venkatasubramanian in 2014

Nalini Venkatasubramanian is an Indian computer scientist who serves as a professor of computer science in the Donald Bren School of Information and Computer Sciences at the University of California, Irvine. She is known for her contributions to distributed systems, resource management, multimedia computing, and urban crisis response. Her research focuses on the efficient management and utilization of resources in global information infrastructures, with applications in disaster response, networked systems, and ubiquitous computing.

== Early life and education ==
Venkatasubramanian was born and raised in Bangalore, India. She pursued her undergraduate education in computer science before moving to the United States for graduate studies. She earned her Ph.D. in computer science from the University of Illinois, Urbana-Champaign, in 1998. Her doctoral research focused on resource management in distributed systems.

== Career and research ==
From 1991 to 1998, Venkatasubramanian worked as a member of technical staff and software design engineer at Hewlett-Packard. During her tenure, she contributed to large-scale software systems, further developing her expertise in distributed computing and networked environments.

In 1998, she joined the University of California, Irvine, as an assistant professor of computer science. Over the years, she has advanced to a full professorship and has been actively involved in research, teaching, and mentorship. She has advised numerous graduate students and collaborated with industry partners and governmental agencies on projects related to networked systems and emergency response technologies.

Venkatasubramanian's research spans multiple areas, including:

- Distributed and Networked Systems – Developing frameworks for scalable resource management in cloud and edge computing.
- Multimedia Computing – Optimizing data transmission and processing for multimedia applications.
- Crisis Informatics – Designing computing infrastructures for disaster response, including real-time data analysis for emergency situations.
- Ubiquitous Computing – Creating adaptive computing environments that integrate seamlessly into everyday life.

Her work has contributed to the development of intelligent crisis response systems that assist emergency services by providing real-time data and resource allocation strategies. She has been involved in interdisciplinary projects that apply computer science solutions to urban planning, disaster management, and cybersecurity.

She has served on program committees for major computing conferences and as an editorial board member for academic journals in distributed computing and multimedia systems.

She has authored numerous research papers in peer-reviewed journals and conferences, covering topics such as networked multimedia systems, cloud computing, and emergency response systems.

== Awards ==
- 1999: National Science Foundation CAREER Award, Networking Research Program
- 2002: Teaching Excellence Award, Division of Undergraduate Education, University of California, Irvine
- 2006: Best Paper Award, IEEE Consumer Communications and Networking (CCN) Conference
- 2014: Deans Award for Undergraduate Teaching, University of California, Irvine
- 2015: Dean’s Award for Service: Acknowledged for significant service contributions to the university
- 2015: 1st Prize, US Ignite Extreme Software Defined Networking (SDN) Challenge
- 2021: ACM Distinguished Member, Association for Computing Machinery
- 2025: IEEE Fellow
