= Venugopal K.R. =

Indian university administrator

Dr. Venugopal K. R.
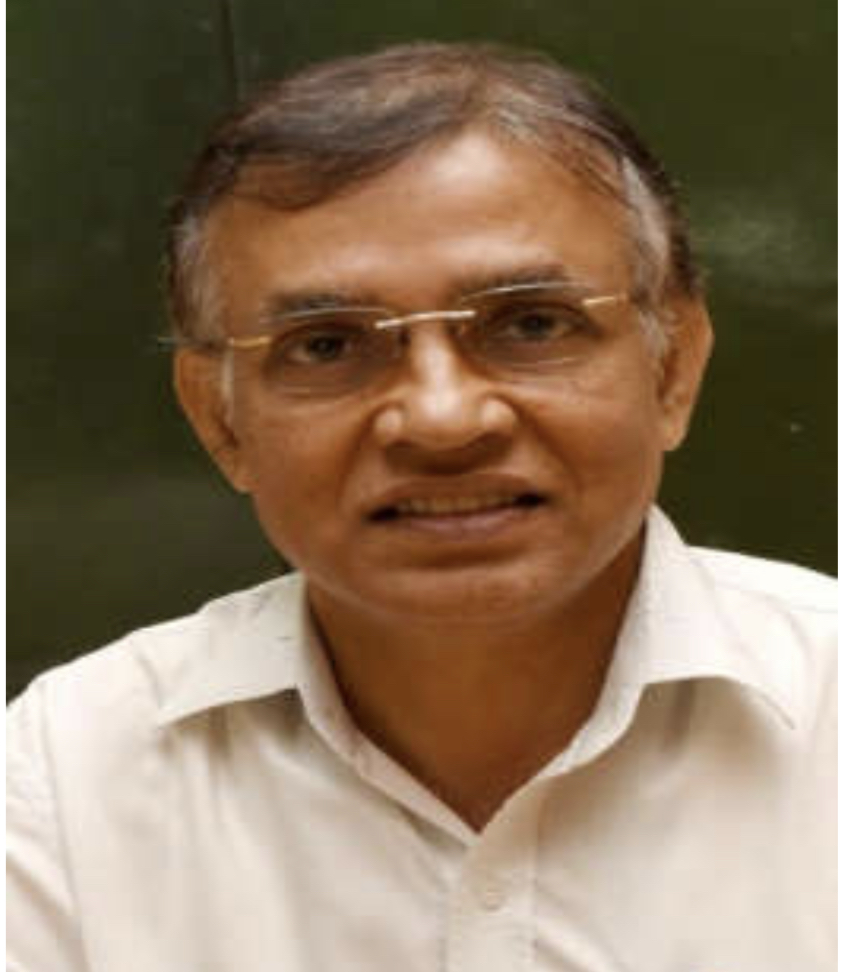

Vice-Chancellor of Bangalore University
- In office 12 June 2018 – 10 June 2022

Principal at University Visvesvaraya College of Engineering
- In office June 2007 – March 2018

Special Officer Government of Karnataka
- In office December 2012 – June 2016

Personal details
- Born: 26 March 1956 (age 70) Bangalore
- Education: Indian Institute of Technology Madras (IITM), Chennai, Indian Institute of Science (IISc), Bengaluru, University Visvesvaraya College of Engineering (UVCE), Bengaluru, Bangalore University, Bengaluru.
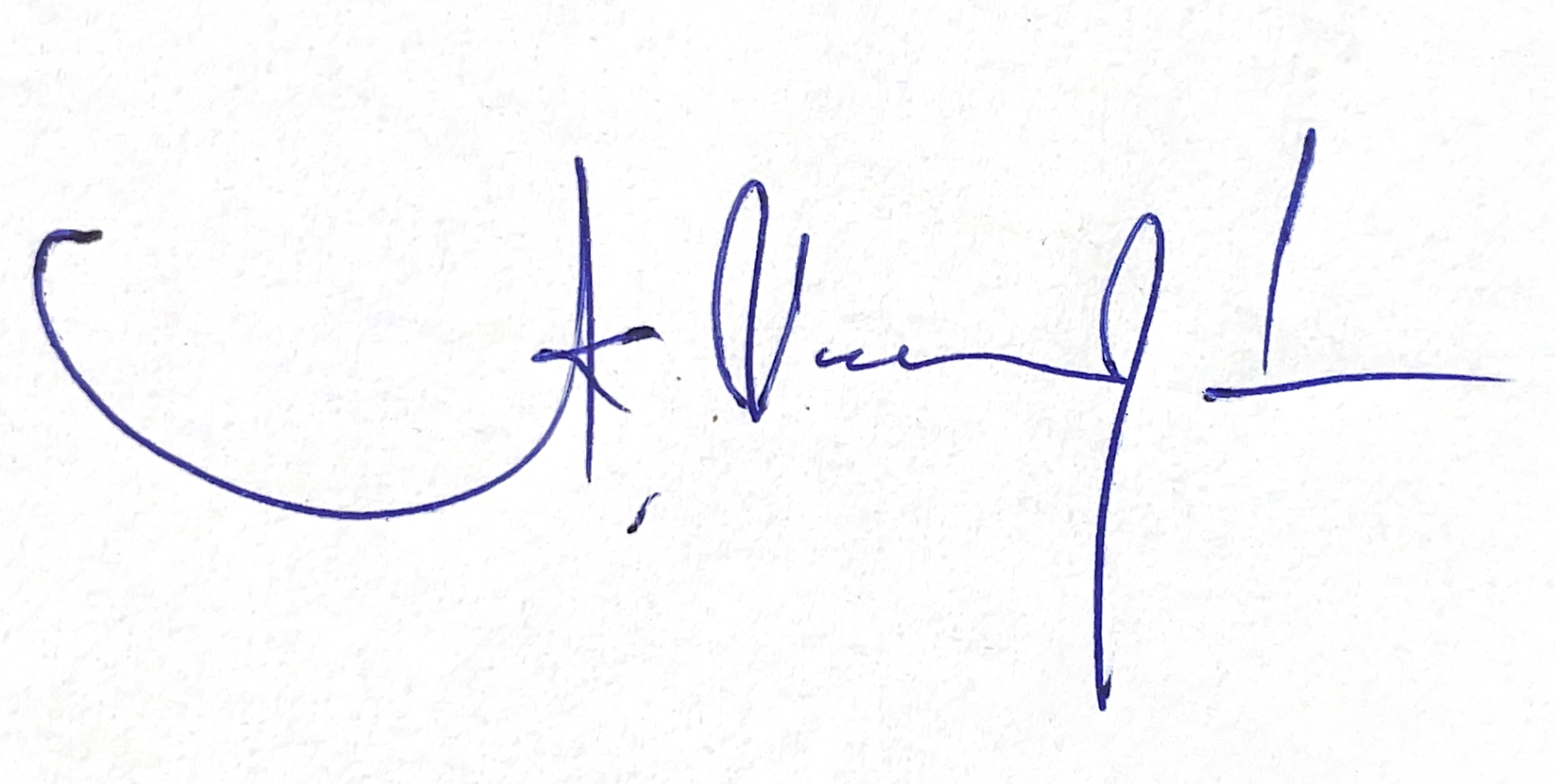
- Signature
- Website: Personal website

Venugopal Kuppanna Rajuk known as Venugopal K. R. (VKR) was former Vice-Chancellor of Bangalore University, Principal of University Visvesvaraya College of Engineering (UVCE). He was also the chairman, Department of Electronics and Communication, Computer Science Engineering and Information Science Engineering in University Visvesvaraya College of Engineering (UVCE). He has served UVCE as well as Bangalore University for the last five decades. UVCE has been affiliated to Bangalore University since 1964. Dr. Venugopal K R was the Special Officer to the Government of Karnataka for Trifurcating Bangalore University. He submitted the report on 26 March 2015 for restructuring Bangalore University into Bangalore University, Bengaluru City University and Bengaluru North University and UVCE to be carved out as Center of Excellence on the model of Indian Institute of Technology. UVCE was granted autonomy by a bill tabled in Karnataka assembly and now UVCE is an autonomous institution with effect from 25 March 2022.

== Education ==
Dr Venugopal K R holds PhD in economics from the Bangalore University, Bengaluru and also a PhD in Computer Science and Engineering from Indian Institute of Technology Madras (IITM), Chennai. He graduated from the Indian Institute Science (IISc), Bengaluru with an ME degree. He got his BE degree from UVCE in the field of Electronics and Communication. Along with these, he has also obtained degree in more than 10 fields including Economics, Finance, Law, Public Relations and so on. He has authored many books including Data Science and Computational Intelligence Computer, Networks and Intelligent Computing, Microprocessors X86 Programming, Mastering C, Introduction to Linux and Shell Scripting, C Test Your Aptitude, Programming with Pascal and C, Web Recommendation System. Petrodollar and the World Economy, Mastering C++

== Achievements ==
Venugopal K R has 1,300 research publications (more than 20,000 pages), with 43 best paper awards, authored and edited 119 books (more than 50,000 pages), has been granted 45 utility patents, with over 10,000 citations and google scholar h-index of 46 focusing mainly on the subjects of Economics and Computer Science. He has awarded PhDs to 30 students, mentored 300+ research scholars, supervised 600+ postgraduate dissertations and 200+ undergraduate projects.

== Awards and honors ==
His awards include IEEE Fellow, ACM Distinguished Member, Anna University National Award, IEEE Best Branch Counsellor, Karnataka State Government Award, UP State National Award and others.
