= Gail-Joon Ahn =

Electrical engineer at Arizona State University

Gail-Joon Ahn is an electrical engineer and professor of computer science and engineering at Arizona State University. He is an IEEE Fellow and an ACM Fellow.

== Education ==
Ahn received his PhD in information technology from George Mason University in 2000.

== Career ==
Ahn is professor of computer science and engineering at the Ira A. Fulton Schools of Engineering, Arizona State University. He is the founder of the university's Security Engineering for Future Computing laboratory and served as its first director. Ahn has contributed to over 200 research papers and holds 10 United States patents. He is the co-editor-in-chief of the IEEE Transactions on Dependable and Secure Computing, an associate editor of ACM Transactions on Information and Systems Security and a member of the editorial board of Computers & Security. Before joining Arizona State University, Ahn was an associate professor at the University of North Carolina at Charlotte's College of Computing and Informatics and director of their Center for Digital Identity and Cyber Defense Research.

== Awards and honors ==
- 2004: Federal Information Systems Security Educators Association Educator of the Year Award
- 2007: Senior Member of the Association for Computing Machinery
- 2013: Arizona State University Most Outstanding Research Award
- 2015: ACM Distinguished Member
- 2023: IEEE Fellow "for development of applications of information and systems security"
- 2025: ACM Fellow "for contributions to the foundations and practical applications of information and systems security, including formal models and policy frameworks"
