= Shixia Liu =

Chinese computer scientist

Shixia Liu (Chinese: 刘世霞) is a Chinese computer scientist whose research involves information visualization, visual methods in text mining, and the use of visual analytics in explainable artificial intelligence. She is a professor in the Tsinghua University School of Software.

== Education and career ==
Liu studied mathematics at Harbin Institute of Technology, earning a bachelor's degree in 1996 and a master's degree in 1998. She completed a Ph.D. in computer science and technology at Tsinghua University in 2002.

She was a researcher for IBM's IBM China Research Lab from 2002 until 2010, and for Microsoft Research Asia from 2010 until 2014. In 2014, she returned to Tsinghua University as an associate professor; she was given tenure in 2018, and promoted to full professor in 2021.

== Recognition ==
Liu was named to the IEEE Visualization Academy in 2020, and elected as an IEEE Fellow in 2021 "for contributions to visual text analysis and visual model analysis". She was a 2022 recipient of the Technical Achievement Award of the IEEE Visualization and Graphics Technical Community. Also in 2022, she was elected an ACM Distinguished Member.
