= Gillian Hayes =

American computer scientist

Academic background
- Education: BS, Mathematics and Computer Science, 1997, Vanderbilt University; PhD, Computer Science, 2007, Georgia Institute of Technology
- Thesis: Documenting and understanding everyday activities through the selective archiving of live experiences (2007)

Academic work
- Institutions: Donald Bren School of Information and Computer Sciences
- Main interests: human-computer interaction, ubiquitous computing, assistive and educational technologies, and health informatics
- Website: gillianhayes.com

Gillian Rachael Hayes is an American computer scientist. She is the Robert A. and Barbara L. Kleist Professor in the Donald Bren School of Information and Computer Sciences and Vice Provost for Graduate Education and Dean of the Graduate Division at UC Irvine.

== Early life and education ==
Hayes completed her Bachelor of Science degree in Mathematics and Computer Science in 1997 at Vanderbilt University and her PhD in Computer Science from Georgia Institute of Technology.

== Career ==
Upon completing her PhD, Hayes joined the faculty at the Donald Bren School of Information and Computer Sciences in 2007. While working as an associate professor of informatics, she was named the inaugural holder of the Robert A. and Barbara L. Kleist Chair in Informatics. In this role, she received one of three Advanced Research Fellowships awarded by The Jacobs Foundation to develop a framework for designing technologies for and with youth, as well as establish a structure for measuring the outcomes of these technological designs. Upon returning to teaching, she was a finalist for the 2017 Community Engaged Scholar Award.

Hayes was named the third Vice Provost for Graduate Education and Dean of the Graduate Division on September 1, 2019, replacing Frances Leslie. In the same year, she was the recipient of the Social Impact Award as someone who "promotes the application of human-computer interaction research to pressing social needs." During the COVID-19 pandemic, Hayes and colleague Sharad Mehrotra were named ACM Distinguished Members for their outstanding scientific contributions that "propel the digital age."
