= Xuelong Li =

Researcher in artificial intelligence and computer vision

Xuelong Li is the Chief Technology Officer (CTO) of China Telecom since 2023, and the director of the Institute of Artificial Intelligence (TeleAI) of China Telecom (2024), working in artificial intelligence and computer vision.

== Education ==
Li entered the University of Science and Technology of China in 1994 and later graduated with a master's degree and a doctoral degree.

== Awards ==
Li was named a IEEE Fellow in 2011 (in the fellows class of 2012), "for contributions to pattern recognition and its applications in multimedia signal processing". He became an ACM Distinguished Member in 2015. He was elected a Member of the Academia Europaea in 2017. He is also a Fellow of the British Computer Society and an AAAS Fellow. He was elected an AAAI Fellow in 2023.
