= Carla Chiasserini =

Italian communications engineer

Carla Fabiana Chiasserini is an Italian communications engineer specializing in wireless networks, edge computing, and power management for networked devices. She is a professor in the Electronics and Telecommunications Department at the Polytechnic University of Turin.

== Education and career ==
Chiasserini studied electronic engineering at the University of Florence, earning a laurea in 1996. She completed a Ph.D. at the Polytechnic University of Turin in 2000, and in the same year joined the university as an assistant professor. She was promoted to associate professor in 2006 and to full professor in 2018.

Chiasserini is editor-in-chief of the journal Computer Communications, published by Elsevier.

== Recognition ==
Chiasserini was elected as an IEEE Fellow, in the 2018 class of fellows, "for contributions to energy efficiency and cooperation in wireless networks". She was named as an ACM Distinguished Member in 2023 before becoming an ACM Fellow the following year "for contributions to the design of high-performance mobile networks and services".
