= Qinru Qiu =

Chinese-American computer engineer

Qinru Qiu is a Chinese-American computer engineer whose research interests include efficient energy use in computing, and neuromorphic computing. She is a Distinguished Professor of Electrical Engineering and Computer Science at Syracuse University, and the director of the university's Electrical Engineering and Computer Science graduate program.

== Education and career ==
Qiu has a 1994 bachelor's degree in electrical engineering from Zhejiang University. She went to the University of Southern California for graduate study, earning a master's degree in 1998 and completing her Ph.D. in 2001.

She was a faculty member in the Department of Electrical and Computer Engineering at Binghamton University before moving to her present position at Syracuse in 2011.

== Recognition ==
In 2022, Qiu was elected an ACM Distinguished Member. Qiu was named an IEEE Fellow, in the 2024 class of fellows, "for contributions to modeling and optimization of energy efficient computing systems".
