= Puneet Sharma =

Indian computer scientist

Puneet Sharma is the director of the Networking & Distributed Systems lab at Hewlett Packard Labs, where he is also an HPE Fellow and vice-president. He started his career as a research scientist at HP Labs in September 1998.

== Early life and education ==
Sharma was born in Ghaziabad, India. He holds a B.Tech. in computer science and engineering from the Indian Institute of Technology, Delhi and a PhD in computer science from the University of Southern California. During his doctoral studies, he contributed to the standardisation of Protocol Independent Multicast.

His Ph.D. dissertation titled Scaling control traffic in network protocols argued that the unregulated growth of network control traffic can jeopardise the primary function of networks, which is to carry data traffic. The dissertation presented designs for regulating network control traffic along three scaling dimensions: (1) frequency, (2) distribution scope, and (3) information aggregation. Several network protocols use the soft state paradigm for state management. These protocols use periodic refresh messages to keep the network state alive while adapting to changing network conditions. However, the scalability of protocols that use the soft-state approach is a concern. He co-invented the scalable timers approach for soft state protocols, where timer values are adapted dynamically, based on the volume of control traffic and the available bandwidth on the network link.

== Career ==
In 2014, Sharma was named a Fellow of the Institute of Electrical and Electronics Engineers (IEEE) for "contributions to the design of scalable networking, software defined networks and energy efficiency in data centers". In 2011, he was recognized as an ACM Distinguished Member for contributions to computing research. His work on mobile collaborative communities was featured in New Scientist in 2019.
