= Fabio Kon =

Brazilian computer scientist

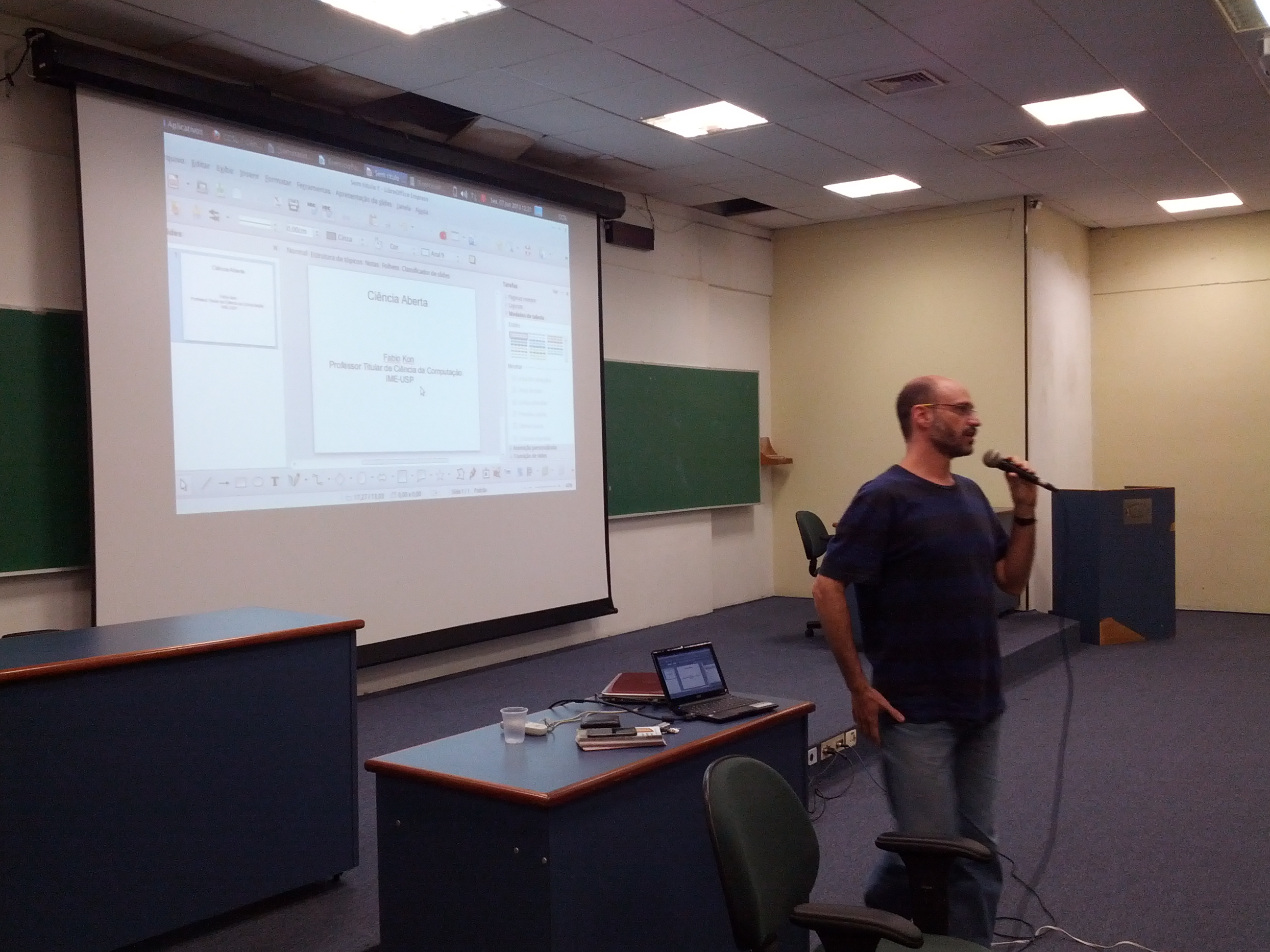
- Education: University of São Paulo, São Paulo State University, University of São Paulo, University of Illinois Urbana-Champaign, University of Illinois Urbana-Champaign
- Awards: ACM Distinguished Member (2016)
- Scientific career
- Fields: Informatics, computer science, smart city, software system, data science
- Workplaces: Massachusetts Institute of Technology (2018–2019)
- Thesis: Automatic Configuration of Component-Based Distributed Systems
- Doctoral advisor: Roy H. Campbell
- Doctoral students: Arlindo Flavio da Conceição, Francisco José da Silva e Silva, Raphael Yokoingawa de Camargo, José de Ribamar Braga Pinheiro, Jr., Helves Humberto Domingues, Claudia de Oliveira Melo, Paulo Roberto Miranda Meirelles, Higor Amario de Souza

Fabio Kon is a former director of the Open Source Initiative and a full professor of the department of computer science of the University of São Paulo, Brazil. He is the primary contact for the University of São Paulo FLOSS Competence Center.

== Education ==
Kon studied computer science at the University of São Paulo (USP) and music at the São Paulo State University. He received his master degree in applied mathematics from the Institute of Mathematics and Statistics, USP, in 1994 with the dissertation Sistemas de Arquivos Distribuídos.

In 2000, Kon received his PhD in computer science from the University of Illinois Urbana-Champaign, with the thesis Automatic Configuration of Component-Based Distributed Systems, advised by Ron Harold Campbell.

== Career ==
Kon is Full Professor at IME-USP since 2011. Kon was a visiting professor at Technion, Israel in 2013 and at MIT in 2018.

== Awards ==
- 2016: ACM Distinguished Member
- 2018: Fulbright Visiting Professor Fellowship.

== Works ==
- 2004: InteGrade: object‐oriented Grid middleware leveraging the idle computing power of desktop machines.
- 2013: Interpretative case studies on agile team productivity and management.
- 2013: The attraction of contributors in free and open source software projects..
- 2018: Software platforms for smart cities: Concepts, requirements, challenges, and a unified reference architecture.
