= Ernesto Damiani =

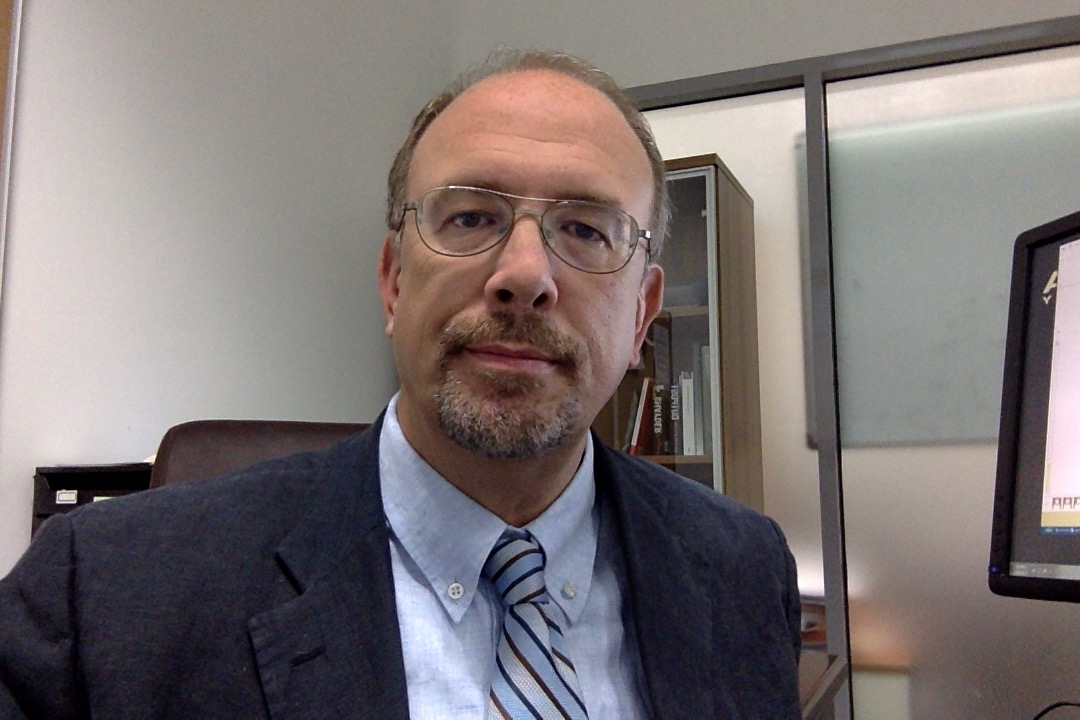
Ernesto Damiani

Ernesto Damiani is a professor of computer science at the University of Milan, where he leads the Architectures Research (SESAR) Lab. He is the Senior Director of the Artificial Intelligence and Intelligent Systems Institute at Khalifa University, in the UAE. He holds visiting positions at Tokyo Denki University, Université de Bourgogne. Damiani received an honorary doctorate from Institut National des Sciences Appliquées de Lyon, France (2017). His research spans security, Big Data and knowledge processing, where he has published over 400 peer-reviewed articles and books. He is a Senior Member of the IEEE and an ACM Distinguished Member. Since 2018, he is the President of the Italian Inter-University Consortium for Informatics. In 2025, Damiani received the IEEE TCCH Research and Innovation Award from the IEEE Systems, Man, and Cybernetics Technical Committee on Cyber-Humanities, presented at IEEE CyberHumanities 2025 in Florence, recognizing his leadership at the intersection of computer science and the humanities.
