= Fan Bai =

Researcher and engineer

Fan Bai is a researcher and engineer, from General Motors Global R&D, Detroit, MI.

== Education ==
Bai received a Ph.D. in electrical engineering from the University of Southern California in 2005

== Honors and awards ==
Bai was named Fellow of the Institute of Electrical and Electronics Engineers (IEEE) in 2016 for contributions to vehicular networking and mobility modeling. Since the same year, he is also a fellow of the Vehicular Technology Society. In 2020, Bai was elected an ACM Distinguished Member.
