= André van der Hoek =

American computer scientist

- Born: Netherlands
- Other name: Adriaan Willem van der Hoek
- Education: Erasmus University Rotterdam (BS, MS); University of Colorado, Boulder (PhD)
- Known for: Sketching in software design, expert design practices, supporting design meetings over time
- Scientific career
- Fields: Computer science, software engineering, computer supported cooperative work
- Workplaces: University of California, Irvine
- Thesis: A reusable, distributed repository for configuration management policy programming (2000)
- Doctoral advisor: Alexander L. Wolf
- Website: www.ics.uci.edu/~andre/

André van der Hoek is a Dutch and American professor of computer science at the University of California, Irvine (UCI), and department chair of Informatics at the Donald Bren School of Information and Computer Sciences (ICS).

== Education ==
Van der Hoek grew up in the Netherlands and graduated from Erasmus University Rotterdam with BS and MS degrees in Business-Oriented Computer Science in 1994. He continued his studies as a PhD student at the University of Colorado, Boulder in computer science where he researched mainly technical aspects of configuration management. Van der Hoek completed his PhD at the University of Colorado, Boulder in 2000. His thesis was titled A reusable, distributed repository for configuration management policy programming, and was directed by Alexander L. Wolf.

== Career and research ==
In 2000, van der Hoek moved to the University of California, Irvine where his research interest shifted to understanding the role of design in software engineering. He also leads the Software Design and Collaboration Laboratory at the University of California, Irvine (UCI) where his research group focuses (amongst others) on how software design can be supported in meetings over time. His approach to research is deeply linked to actual tool creation, rather than focusing purely on theoretical perspectives of a matter.

In 2013, he was elected an ACM Distinguished Member.

With Marian Petre, he is coauthor of the 2016 book Software Design Decoded: 66 Ways How Experts Think (MIT Press).
