= Sreeranga Rajan =

Sreeranga Rajan is an engineer at Fujitsu Laboratories of America in Sunnyvale, California. He is an ACM Distinguished Member. He was elected an IEEE Fellow for his contributions to scalable formal verification of software and hardware systems.
