= Prabhat Mishra =

American computer scientist

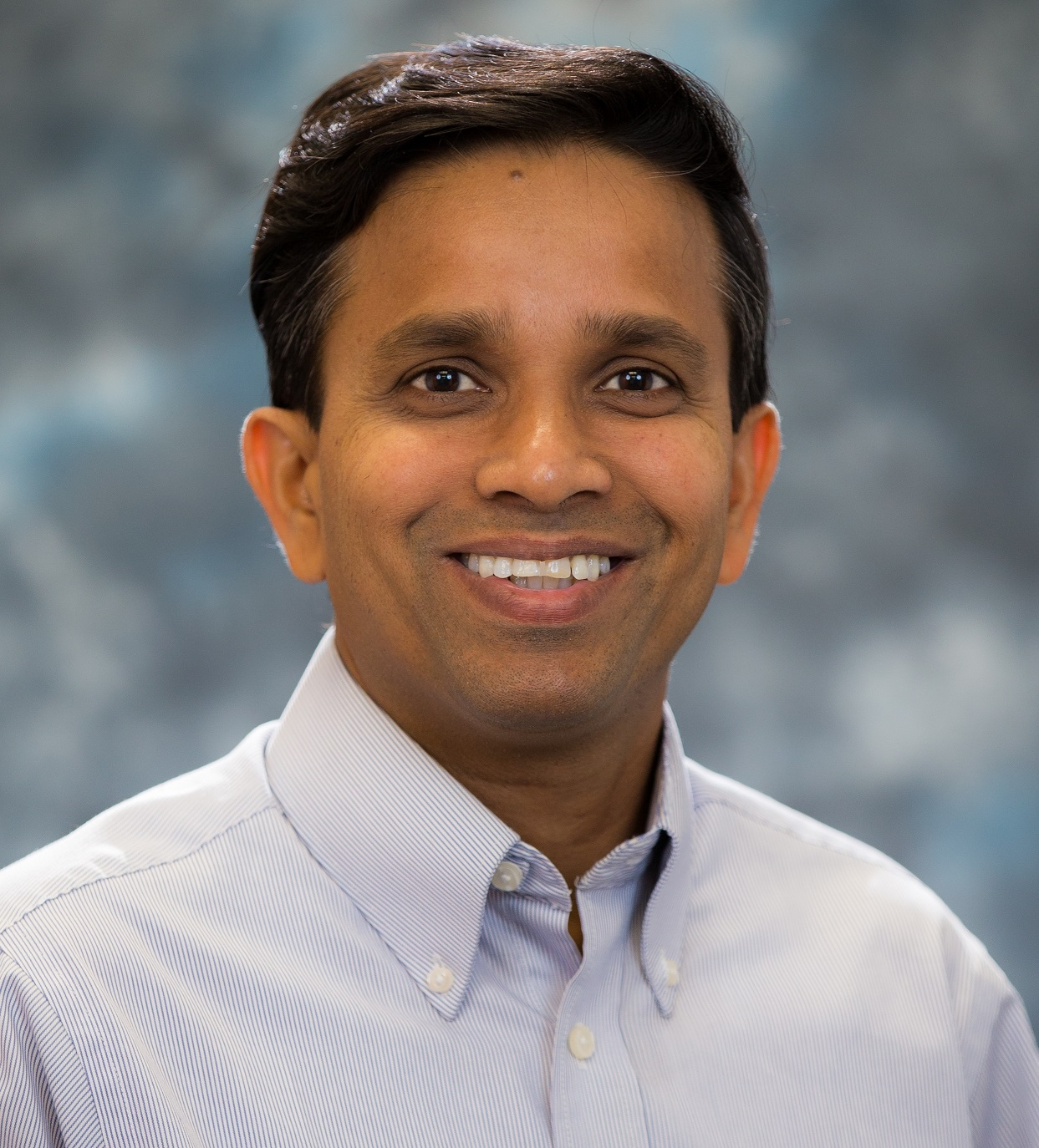
- Born: West Bengal, India
- Education: Univ. of California, Irvine
- Known for: Validation and Verification
- Awards: IEEE Fellow, AAAS Fellow
- Scientific career
- Fields: Computer science
- Workplaces: University of Florida
- Doctoral advisor: Nikil Dutt
- Website: www.cise.ufl.edu/~prabhat

Prabhat Mishra is a professor in the Department of Computer and Information Science and Engineering at the University of Florida. Prof. Mishra's research interests are in hardware security, quantum computing, embedded systems, system-on-chip validation, formal verification, and machine learning.

== Biography ==
Born and raised in India, Mishra received his Ph.D. in computer science from the University of California, Irvine in 2004. He received a B.E. in computer science from the Jadavpur University, India in 1994, and M.Tech. in computer science from the Indian Institute of Technology, Kharagpur, India in 1995. In 2004, he joined University of Florida as an assistant professor. In 2010, he was promoted to an associate professor and by 2016 he became a professor at the same institution. He lives in Gainesville, Florida, with his family.

== Academic life ==
His research has been recognized by Best Paper Awards and Best Paper Award Nominations at several international conferences. In 2015, he was selected as an ACM Distinguished Member. He was named an IEEE Fellow in 2021 for contributions to system-on-chip validation and design automation of embedded systems. He was elected an AAAS Fellow in 2023 .

== Awards ==
- AAAS Fellow, American Association for the Advancement of Science, 2023
- IEEE Fellow, Institute of Electrical and Electronics Engineers, 2021
- UF Doctoral Dissertation Mentoring Award, University of Florida, 2025
- UF Research Foundation Professor, University of Florida, 2020, 2025
- IET Outstanding Editor Award, Institution of Engineering and Technology, 2019
- ISQED Best Paper Award, International Symposium on Quality Electronic Design, 2016
- ACM Distinguished Member, Association for Computing Machinery, 2015
- IBM Faculty Award, 2015
- VLSI Design Best Paper Award, International Conference on VLSI Design, 2011
- National Science Foundation CAREER Award, US National Science Foundation, 2008
- EDAA Outstanding Dissertation Award, European Design Automation Association, 2004
- CODES+ISSS Best Paper Award, International Conference on Codesign & System Synthesis, 2003

== Books ==
- Design Automation for Quantum Computing, 2026.
- Explainable AI for Cybersecurity, Springer, 2023.
- Network-on-Chip Security and Privacy, Springer, 2021.
- System-on-Chip Security Validation and Verification, Springer, 2019.
- Post-Silicon Validation and Debug, Springer, 2018.
- Hardware IP Security and Trust, Springer, 2017.
- System-Level Validation, Springer, 2012.
- Dynamic Reconfiguration in Real-Time Systems, Springer, 2012.
- Processor Description Languages - Applications and Methodologies, Morgan Kaufmann, 2008.
- Functional Verification of Programmable Embedded Architectures, Springer, 2005.
