= Saurabh Bagchi =

American computer science academic

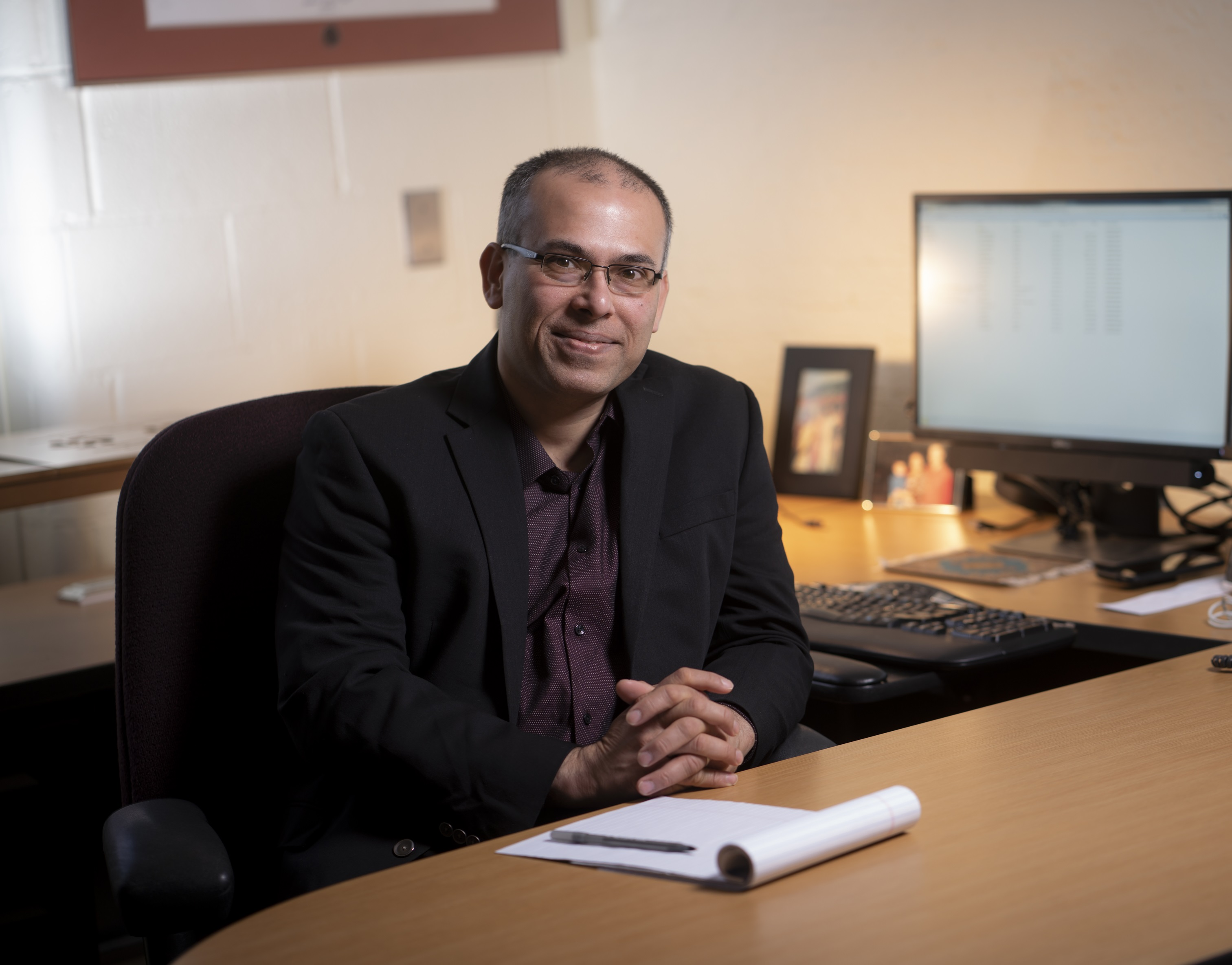
- Bagchi in September 2019
- Born: Kolkata, West Bengal, India
- Occupation: Computer scientist
- Awards: Fellow of the IET, AAIA, ACM Distinguished Member, IEEE Distinguished Visitor, IFIP Full Member, IEEE Computer Society Board of Governors

Academic background
- Education: University of Illinois at Urbana-Champaign, Indian Institute of Technology Kharagpur
- Website: saurabhbagchi.us

Saurabh Bagchi is an Indian-born American academic researcher and educator in the area of computer science and engineering. He is a professor of Electrical and Computer Engineering and Computer Science at Purdue University. His contributions have been in the area of reliability and security of distributed computing systems and Internet-of-Things (IoT).

== Education ==
Bagchi earned a B.Tech. degree in Computer Science and Engineering from the Indian Institute of Technology in Kharagpur, India. He earned MS and Ph.D. degrees in Computer Science from the University of Illinois at Urbana-Champaign in 1999 and 2001 respectively, working with Prof. Ravishankar Iyer.

== Career ==
From 2001 to 2002, Bagchi was a research staff member at the IBM Thomas J. Watson Research Center in New York, NY in the Distributed Messaging Systems group. He joined Purdue University in 2002 at the West Lafayette campus in Indiana, where he was subsequently promoted to associate professor and then full professor. He leads the National Science Foundation Center called CHORUS since 2024, on resilience of cyber-physical systems. He founded and directs a university-wide center called CRISP (Center for Resilient Infrastructures, Systems, and Processes) with about 25 affiliated faculty.

Bagchi has supervised 25 Ph.D. dissertations and about 50 MS dissertations. He is the co-author of a book from Springer titled System Dependability and Analytics - Approaching System Dependability from Data, System and Analytics Perspectives and a book on wireless security.

He has published more than 1,000 articles in books, journals, and conferences that have been cited more than 13,000 times for an h-index value of (63, 40) (All, Recent).

== Professional affiliations ==
Bagchi is a Full Professor at Purdue University in ECE and CS. He is also a Visiting Faculty at the Indian Institute of Technology Bombay in the Computer Science and Engineering Department. Previously, he was the Inaugural International Visiting Faculty at IIT Kharagpur in the Computer Science and Engineering Department. He was the co-founder of a startup called SensorHound Innovations LLC in 2013, which worked in the area of IoT reliability. He is the CTO of a recent startup called KeyByte LLC which is seeking to commercialize cloud-hosted databases.
