= Rosa Badia =

Spanish computer scientist

Rosa María Badia Sala (born 1966) is a Spanish computer scientist specializing in parallel computing, supercomputing, superscalar processing, and multi-core processing. She is a researcher of the Spanish National Research Council, affiliated with the Barcelona Supercomputing Center, where she is the manager of the workflows and distributed computing group.

== Education and career ==
Badia earned a degree in computer science from the Polytechnic University of Catalonia (UPC) in 1989, and continued at UPC for a Ph.D., which she completed in 1994, under the direction of Jordi Cortadella. She worked at UPC as a lecturer in computer architecture from 1989 to 1997, and then as an associate professor from 1997 to 2008.

Badia's early work concerned electronic design automation. While working at UPC, she became a researcher at the European Center of Parallelism of Barcelona (CEPBA) beginning in 1999, through which her interests shifted to parallel computing. In 2005 she became manager of the workflows and distributed computing group in the Barcelona Supercomputing Center, the successor project to CEPBA.

She became a researcher for the Spanish National Research Council in 2008, also continuing to lecture at the UPC as a part-time associate professor since 2011.

== Recognition ==
Badia was the 2019 winner of the Euro-Par Achievement Award, an annual award of the European Conference on Parallel Processing given to researchers with outstanding contributions to the topic. Also in 2019, the Generalitat de Catalunya gave her their DonaTIC prize in the academic/researcher category, recognizing the achievements of women in STEM in Catalonia.

She won the HPDC Achievement Award for 2021 at the ACM Symposium on High-Performance Parallel and Distributed Computing (HPDC '21), "for her innovations in parallel task-based programming models, workflow applications and systems, and leadership in the high performance computing research community". Also in 2021, she was elected an ACM Distinguished Member.
