= Chuan Wu =

Chinese computer scientist

Chuan Wu (Chinese: 吳川) is a Chinese computer scientist whose research interests include cloud computing, distributed machine learning, and applications in elderly care. She is a professor of computer science at the University of Hong Kong.

== Education and career ==
Wu was a student of computer science and technology at Tsinghua University, where she received a bachelor's degree in 2000 and a master's degree in 2002. After working in industry in Singapore, she went to the University of Toronto in Canada for doctoral study in electrical and computer engineering, and completed her Ph.D. in 2008. Her doctoral dissertation, Large-Scale Peer-to-Peer Streaming: Modeling, Measurements, and Optimizing Solutions, was supervised by Baochun Li.

She joined the University of Hong Kong Department of Computer Science in 2008, and is now a full professor there.

== Recognition ==
In 2024, Wu was elected as an ACM Distinguished Member and the next year named to the 2025 class of IEEE Fellows "for contributions to resource scheduling in cloud computing and distributed machine learning systems".
