= Lili Qiu =

Chinese computer scientist

- Education: University of Bridgeport; Cornell University
- Scientific career
- Fields: Computer science
- Workplaces: University of Austin at Texas

Lili Qiu is a Chinese computer scientist whose research spans wireless network, wireless sensing, machine learning systems, and applications in healthcare. She is a Fellow of the Institute of Electrical and Electronics Engineers (IEEE), the Association for Computing Machinery (ACM), and the National Academy of Inventors (NAI). She is currently a professor of computer science at the University of Texas at Austin and vice managing director of Microsoft Research Asia.

== Education and career ==
Qiu was born in Shanghai, where she attended Nanyang Model High School.

She moved to the US for her undergraduate studies, earning a bachelor's degree with honors for a double major in computer science and physics at the University of Bridgeport.

She completed her Ph.D. at Cornell University. Her dissertation, An Integrated Approach to Improving Web Performance, was jointly supervised by Robbert van Renesse and George Varghese.

After working at Microsoft Research, Redmond, WA|Microsoft Research (MSR), Redmond, Washington, from 2001 to 2004, she joined the Department of Computer Science at University of Texas at Austin as an assistant professor in 2005, and later promoted to a tenured professor.

In spring 2022, she joined Microsoft Research Asia (MSRA) as vice managing director and is currently leading MSRA Shanghai branch.

== Recognition ==
Qiu became a fellow of the Institute of Electrical and Electronics Engineers in 2017, elected as an ACM Fellow in 2018 for "contributions to the design and analysis of wireless network protocols and mobile systems", and selected as a Fellow of National Academy of Inventors (NAI) in 2022. She was also recognized as N2Women: Stars in Computer Networking and Communications in 2017, ACM Distinguished Member in 2013, Google Faculty Award, and National Science Foundation CAREER Award in 2006. She received Best Paper Awards at ACM MobiSys 2018, IEEE ICNP 2017, CCR 2025, AAAI 2026 and SIGMOBILE Test of Time 2026.
