= Dimitris Gizopoulos =

Dimitris Gizopoulos from the University of Athens, Athens, Greece was named Fellow of the Institute of Electrical and Electronics Engineers (IEEE) in 2013 "for contributions to self-testing and on-line error detection of microprocessor architectures". In 2022, he was elected an ACM Distinguished Member.
