= Richa Singh =

Indian computer scientist

Richa Singh is an Indian computer scientist whose research areas are biometrics, including face recognition and iris recognition, pattern recognition, dependable deep learning, and more recently generative AI. She is a professor at the Department of Computer Science & Engineering at IIT Jodhpur.

== Education and career ==
Singh earned a Ph.D. in computer science in 2008 from West Virginia University. Her dissertation, Mitigating the Effect of Covariates in Face Recognition, was supervised by Afzel Noore.

She became an assistant professor at Indraprastha Institute of Information Technology, Delhi in 2009, and was promoted to associate professor in 2015 and full professor in 2019. In 2019, she moved to her present position at IIT Jodhpur.

== Recognition ==
Singh was named a Fellow of the International Association for Pattern Recognition in 2018, "for contributions to face recognition and pattern classification". She was named an IEEE Fellow, in the 2021 class of fellows, "For contributions to robust and secure biometrics". n 2024, she was also named a Fellow of the Indian National Academy of Engineering (INAE). In 2025, she was named an ACM Distinguished Member for her impact in the field.
