= Bhavani Thuraisingham =

Dr. Bhavani Thuraisingham
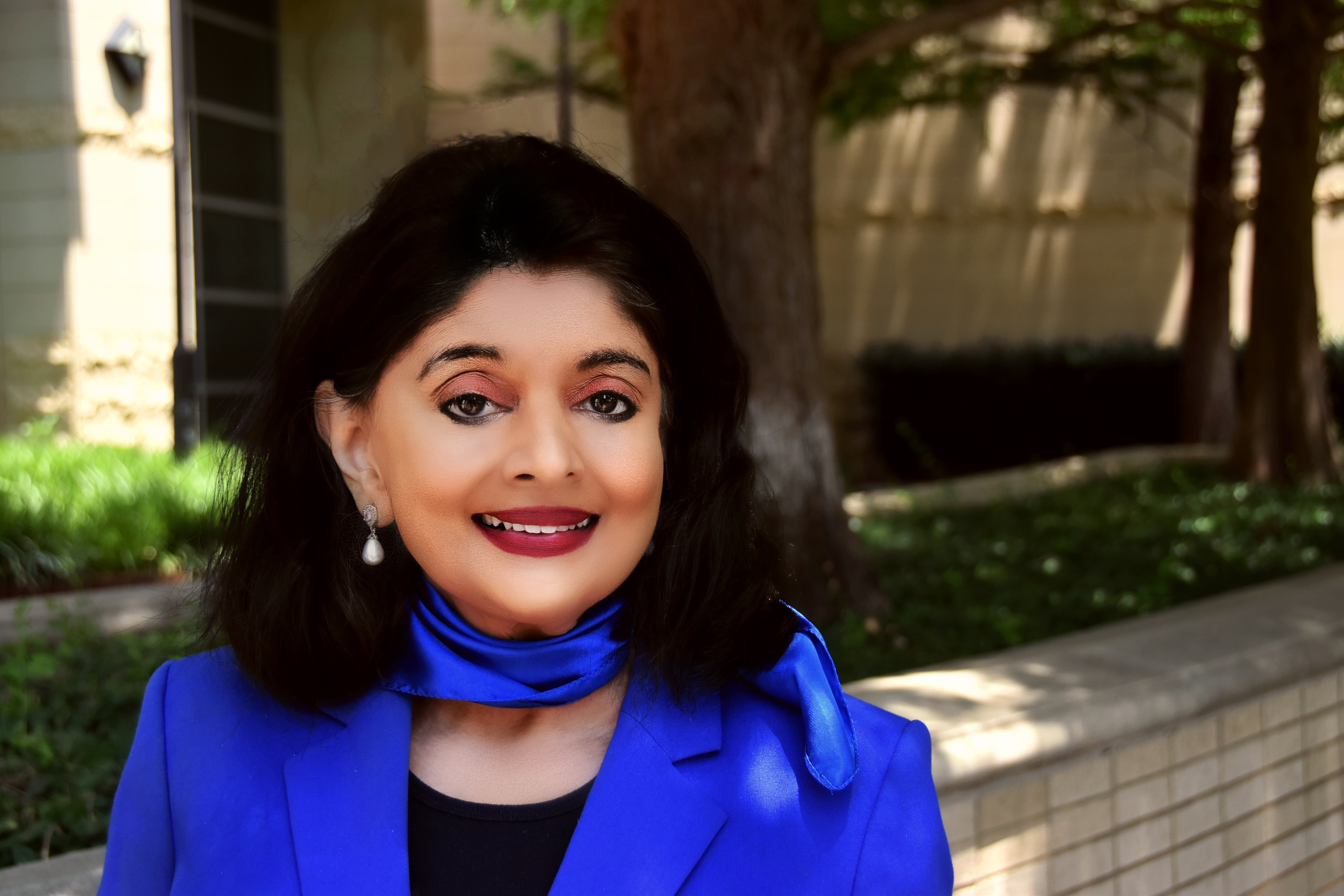
- Born: 1955 (age 70–71); Ceylon (Sri Lanka)
- Scientific career
- Fields: Computer science
- Workplaces: University of Texas at Dallas

Bhavani Thuraisingham is the Louis A. Beecherl, Jr. Distinguished Professor of computer science and the executive director of the Cyber Security Research and Education Institute at the University of Texas at Dallas. She is a visiting senior research fellow in the Department of Informatics at King's College London and a 2017–2018 Cyber Security Policy Fellow at New America.

== Education ==
Thuraisingham received a B.Sc. in pure mathematics, applied mathematics, and physics from the University of Ceylon in 1975. She received an M.Sc. in mathematical logic and foundations of computer science from the University of Bristol and an M.S. in computer science from the University of Minnesota in 1977 and 1984 respectively. She earned a Ph.D. in the theory of computation and computability theory from the University of Wales, Swansea in 1979 and a Doctor of Engineering at the University of Bristol in 2011.

== Career ==
Thuraisingham has worked in commercial industry for Honeywell, Federally Funded Research and Development Center (MITRE), Government (NSF) and Academia. She conducts research in cyber security and specializes in applying data analytics for cyber security.

== Awards and honors ==
- IEEE Fellow, 2003
- IEEE Computer Society 1997 Technical Achievement Award
- AAAS Fellow, 2003
- British Computer Society Fellow, 2005
- ACM SIGSAC Outstanding Contributions Award, 2010
- ACM Distinguished Member, 2010
- ACM Fellow, 2018

== Bibliography ==
- Gloria Childress Townsend: Bhavani Thuraisingham: Sri Lanka to the UK to the US—How I Developed My Computer Science Career. In: Rendering History: The Women of ACM-W. Association for Computing Machinery, New York 2024, ISBN 979-8-4007-1774-1. p. 357–365
