= Elena Simperl =

Computer scientist

Elena Simperl FRSA FBCS
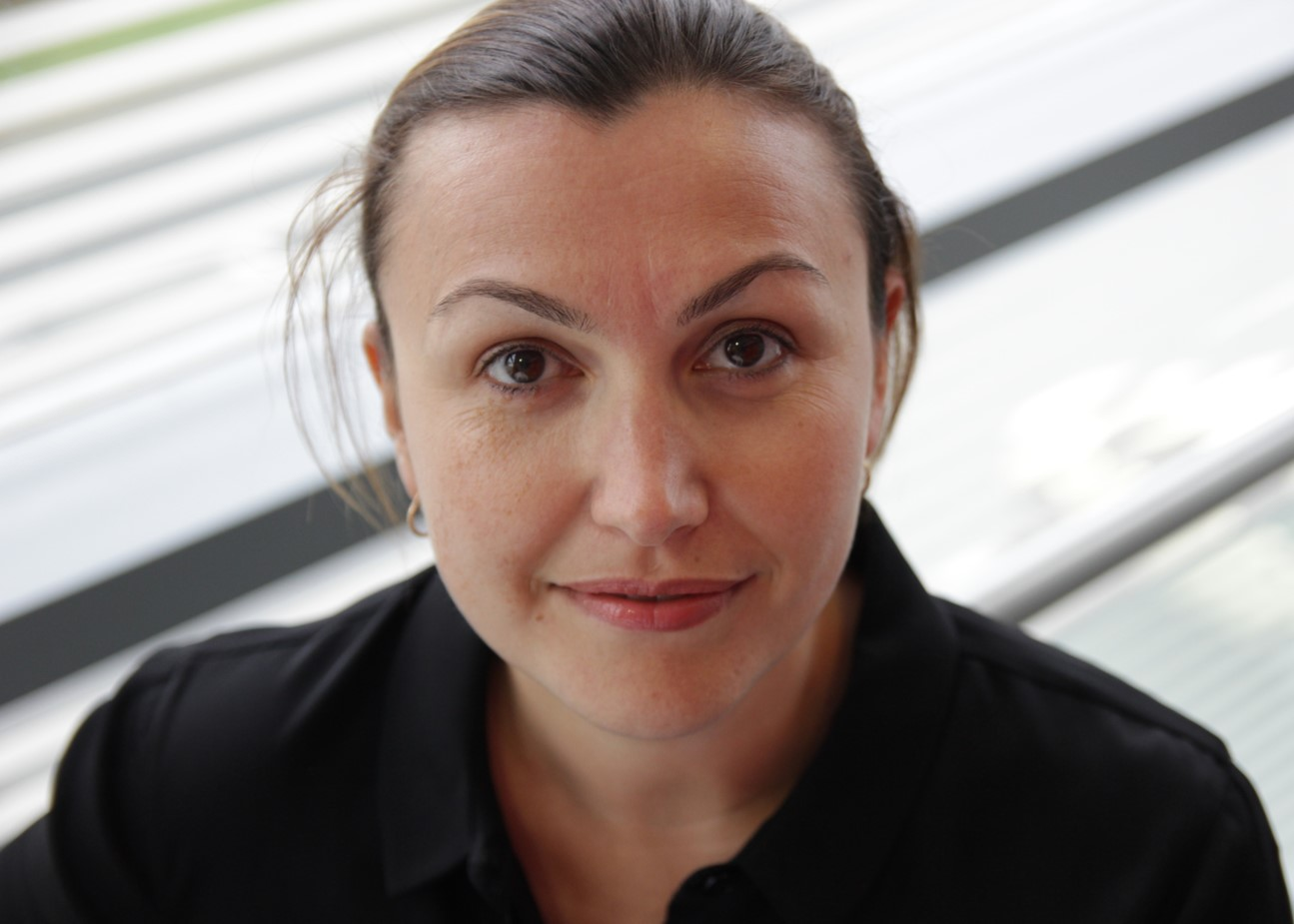
- Born: May 1978 (age 48)
- Education: Technical University of Munich; Free University Berlin
- Scientific career
- Fields: Knowledge engineering and human-machine collectives
- Workplaces: King's College London
- Website: elenasimperl.eu

Elena Simperl (born May 1978) is professor of computer science in the Department of Informatics at King's College London and the Director of Research of the Open Data Institute. She is also Co-Director of the King's Institute for Artificial Intelligence. She is best known for her work in human-machine collectives, with applications to crowdsourcing, citizen science, knowledge communities, and human data interaction, and for her leadership in data-driven innovation and data policy.

== Education ==
Simperl trained as a computer scientist at the Technical University of Munich and completed a PhD in knowledge engineering (Dr rer nat) at the Free University Berlin in 2007.

== Career and research ==
She was the director of Data Pitch, a data innovation programme helping start-ups solve societal challenges through shared data and also the director of Open Data Incubator for Europe (ODINE). which supported start-ups in generating value from open data.

Simperl serves as scientific advisor of data.europa.eu, Europe's flagship initiative in opening up public sector datasets for wider use. She co-chairs the MLCommons task force on standardising metadata for machine learning datasets.

=== Honors and awards ===
According to AMiner, she is in the top 100 most influential scholars in knowledge engineering of the last decade, as well as in the Women in AI 2000 ranking.

Simperl is a fellow of the British Computer Society (FBCS) and of the Royal Society of Arts (FRSA), President of the Semantic Web Science Association and a former Turing Fellow.

She is also a recipient of the Siemens' Hans Fischer Senior Fellowship at the Technical University of Munich, working on safe and trusted AI with knowledge graphs. In 2024, she became an ACM Distinguished Member.
