= Shigang Chen =

Fellow of the Institute of Electrical and Electronics Engineers in 2016

- Citizenship: China
- Education: University of Science and Technology of China, University of Illinois at Urbana–Champaign
- Employer: University of Florida
- Title: Professor

Shigang Chen is a computer scientist at the University of Florida in Gainesville.

== Education ==
Chen got his B.S. in computer science from the University of Science and Technology of China in 1993. Then, he got his M.S. and Ph.D. degrees in the same field from the University of Illinois at Urbana–Champaign in 1996 and 1999, respectively.

== Career ==
Following graduation, he worked with Cisco Systems and in 2002 became an assistant professor at the University of Florida. In 2008, he was promoted to associate professor and by 2013 became a professor at the same institution.

== Honors and awards ==
Chen was named Fellow of the Institute of Electrical and Electronics Engineers (IEEE) in 2016 for contributions to quality of service provisioning and policy-based security management in computer networks. In the same year, he became an ACM Distinguished Member.
