= Sudeep Sarkar =

Indian biometrics engineer

- Citizenship: American
- Education: Ohio State University (PhD, MS); Indian Institute of Technology (BS)
- Scientific career
- Fields: Computer vision, pattern recognition, activity recognition, biometrics, sign language, gait
- Workplaces: University of South Florida, Tampa
- Doctoral advisor: Kim L. Boyer
- Website: Homepage

Sudeep Sarkar is a professor and chairman of the Department of Computer Science and Engineering at the University of South Florida, Tampa. He was named Fellow of the Institute of Electrical and Electronics Engineers (IEEE) in 2013 for contributions to computer vision.

== Scientific career ==
Sarkar has made many influential contributions to the field of biometrics, specifically gait biometrics, burn scar and skin analysis, and other areas in computer vision, particularly perceptual organization, segmentation and grouping, and to the evaluation of vision algorithms.

== Honors ==
Sudeep Sarkar is a fellow of International Association for Pattern Recognition (IAPR), Institute of Electrical and Electronics Engineers (IEEE), American Association for Advancement of Science (AAAS), and American Institute for Medical and Biological Engineering (AIMBE). In 2016, he was inducted into the National Academy of Inventors (NAI). In 2023, he was named an ACM Distinguished Member.
