= Geraldine Fitzpatrick =

Australian computer scientist in Vienna

Geraldine Fitzpatrick (born 1958) is an Australian professor and academic researcher who serves as the head of the Human-Computer Interaction Group at TU Wien (Vienna University of Technology) since 2009. Her research is interdisciplinary at the intersection of social and computer sciences.

She is an ACM Distinguished Member and an IFIP Fellow.

== Education ==
Fitzpatrick started her degree in Computer Science in 1989, in University of Queensland. She holds a PhD in Computer Science and Electrical Engineering and an MSc in Applied Positive Psychology and Coaching Psychology.

Fitzpatrick also holds a certificate in midwifery (1983).

== Career ==
Fitzpatrick's research is on social interaction and spans a range of areas including collaboration, health and well-being, technology-enabled mental health and active engagement for older people.

Prior to her career in information technologies, Fitzpatrick worked as a midwife and a nurse. After completing her degree in computer science, she worked as a research fellow at the Distributed Systems Technology Centre and Centre for Online Health in Australia. She was the Director of the Interact Lab at the University of Sussex.

Fitzpatrick is a member of the ACM Distinguished Member Committee, the ACM CHI Steering Committee. She is the Austrian representative on IFIP TC13. She was the former associate editor and is on the Editorial Advisory Board of the CSCW (Computer Supported Cooperative Work) journal.

== Awards ==
- 2016: ACM Distinguished Member
- 2019: IFIP Technical Committee on Human–Computer Interaction (IFIP TC13) Pioneer Award recipient
- 2020: IFIP fellow
- 2022: SIGCHI Lifetime Service Award
