= Stephanie Ludi =

American computer scientist

- Born: San Diego, California
- Education: Cal Poly, Arizona State University
- Scientific career
- Fields: Computer science
- Institutions: Rochester Institute of Technology, University of North Texas

Stephanie Ludi is an American computer scientist known for her work on accessibility, human–computer interaction, and computer science education. She is a professor of computer science and engineering and associate dean for academic affairs at the University of North Texas.

== Early life and education ==
Ludi grew up in San Diego, California, where her parents worked as a medical technician and a teacher. She is visually impaired and legally blind, and was inspired to go into engineering in order to design a self-driving car that she could use. After becoming a student at the California Polytechnic State University, San Luis Obispo, her interests shifted to computer science.

She graduated with a bachelor's degree in computer science in 1994, and continued at Cal Poly for a master's degree in 1996. Next, she went to Arizona State University for doctoral study in computer science. She completed her Ph.D. in 2003, with a dissertation combining topics from computer science education and software engineering.

== Career ==
After completing her Ph.D., Ludi joined the faculty of the Rochester Institute of Technology. She moved to the University of North Texas in 2016, and served as interim department chair from 2021 to 2022. In June of 2024 Ludi began to serve as the Associate Dean for Academic Affairs in conjunction with her previous assignment.

== Recognition ==
Ludi was named as an ACM Distinguished Member, in the 2024 cohort of distinguished members, "for contributions to accessible computer science education research".
