= Ngoc Thanh Nguyen =

Polish/Vietnamese scientist

Nguyễn Ngọc Thành
- Born: Quảng Bình Province, Vietnam
- Awards: ACM Distinguished Member
- Scientific career
- Fields: Informatics
- Institutions: Wrocław University of Technology; Vietnam National University, Ho Chi Minh City

Nguyễn Ngọc Thành is a Vietnamese informatician at the Wroclaw University of Technology, Poland, and is the head of Department of Applied Informatics in the Faculty of Computer Science and Telecommunication Technology. In 2009, he was elected an ACM Distinguished Member.
