= Peri Tarr =

Peri Tarr received her BS in Zoology from the University of Massachusetts Amherst in 1986, and her MS and PhD in Computer Science from the University of Massachusetts Amherst (1992 and 1996, respectively). Between her BS and MS/PhD, she worked full-time at the University of Massachusetts Physical Plant, attempting to introduce an automated system to help with the Plant's operations. After receiving her PhD, she joined the IBM Thomas J. Watson Research Center as a Research Staff Member in 1996, where she worked on and led various projects relating to issues of software composition, morphogenic software, and aspect-oriented software development.

Her work on multi-dimensional separation of concerns was recognized as the Most Influential Paper at the 2009 International Conference on Software Engineering (ICSE). She is chief architect for Governance of Software Development, an IBM Research initiative that ties together the tools for teams of developers with the planning and financial management aspects required by enterprises.

Tarr was the 2005 program chair of the Aspect-Oriented Software Development conference and was the 2006 general chair of ACM SIGPLAN's OOPSLA 2006 Conference.

In 2012, she was elected an ACM Distinguished Member.
