= Murthy Devarakonda =

Murthy Devarakonda is a computer scientist at the AI Innovation Center of Novartis Pharmaceuticals, Cambridge, MA.

In 2012, he was elected an ACM Distinguished Member. He was named an IEEE Fellow in 2015 for his contributions to measurement-based analytics of distributed systems for data center optimization.
