= Xu Changsheng =

Chinese computer scientist

Xu Changsheng (Chinese: 徐常胜) is a Chinese computer scientist. He is a professor at the Institute of Automation of the Chinese Academy of Sciences in Beijing and Executive Director of China-Singapore Institute of Digital Media.

In 2012, he was elected an ACM Distinguished Member. He was named a Fellow of the Institute of Electrical and Electronics Engineers (IEEE) in 2014 for his contributions to multimedia content analysis.
