= Gregg Rothermel =

American computer scientist

Gregg Evan Rothermel
- Education: B.A., Philosophy; M.S., Computer Science; Ph.D., Computer Science
- Alma mater: Reed College; State University of New York at Albany; Clemson University
- Occupations: Computer scientist, software engineer and academic
- Awards: National Science Foundation CAREER Award; ACM Distinguished Member; IEEE Fellow
- Scientific career
- Institutions: North Carolina State University; University of Nebraska–Lincoln

Gregg Evan Rothermel is an American computer scientist, software engineer and academic. He is a Distinguished University Professor and was the former Head of the Department of Computer Science at North Carolina State University.

Rothermel’s research has focused on software engineering and program analysis, with a particular emphasis on the applications of program analysis techniques to problems in the context of software maintenance and testing, end-user software engineering, and empirical studies. He co-founded the ESQuaReD Laboratory at the University of Nebraska–Lincoln, and the Software-Artifact Infrastructure Repository (SIR). He also co-founded the EUSES Consortium, a group of researchers who, with National Science Foundation's support, have led end-user software engineering research.

Rothermel is an IEEE Fellow and an ACM Distinguished Member.

== Education ==
Rothermel earned a B.A. in Philosophy from Reed College in 1983, and an M.S. in Computer Science from the State University of New York at Albany in 1986. He then enrolled at Clemson University and received his Ph.D. degree in Computer Science, under the supervision of Mary Jean Harrold, in 1996.

== Career ==
Rothermel began his academic career as a teaching assistant of computer science at State University of New York at Albany in 1985. In 1991, he joined Clemson University as a teaching assistant in the Department of Computer Science, and became a Research Assistant the following year. He then held a brief appointment at the Ohio State University as a senior research associate in the Department of Computer and Information Science through 1996, before joining Oregon State University as an assistant professor of Computer Science. In 2001, he was promoted to associate professor at Oregon State. From 2004 through 2018, he served on the faculty of the Department of Computer Science and Engineering at the University of Nebraska–Lincoln as professor and Jensen Chair of Software Engineering. From 2018, he served as professor and head of the Department of Computer Science at North Carolina State University until his retirement on August 1, 2025.

== Research ==
Rothermel has published over 230 articles, has been cited over 24,000 times, and has a Google Scholar H-index of 75. He holds two U.S. Patents

Rothermel has received recognition for his pioneering contributions in developing and empirically evaluating regression testing techniques. He was among the first researchers to propose and empirically study test case prioritization techniques. He also published a paper highlighting the issues regarding regression test selection techniques, and used these issues as the basis for a framework within which to evaluate the techniques.

Rothermel has also worked on "end-user software engineering". His research is concerned with enabling non-professional programmers to create more dependable systems while developing programs such as spreadsheets, web macros, and web mashups. In 2001, he introduced and explored a methodology to adapt data flow adequacy criteria and coverage monitoring to the task of testing spreadsheets.

== Awards and honors ==
- 1997-2001: National Science Foundation CAREER Award, National Science Foundation
- 1999: Engelbrecht Young Faculty Award, Oregon State University College of Engineering
- 2003: Research Award, Oregon State University College of Engineering
- 2013: Excellence in Science and Technology Award, University at Albany
- 2013: ACM Distinguished Member, Association for Computing Machinery
- 2016: IEEE Fellow, Institute of Electrical and Electronics Engineers
- 2020: Retrospective Impact Paper Award Keynote, ISSTA

== Bibliography ==
- Rothermel, G., & Harrold, M. J. (1996). Analyzing regression test selection techniques. IEEE Transactions on Software Engineering (TSE), 22(8), 529-551.
- Rothermel, G., & Harrold, M. J. (1997). A safe, efficient regression test selection technique. ACM Transactions on Software Engineering and Methodology (TOSEM), 6(2), 173-210.
- Rothermel, G., Untch, R. H., Chu, C., & Harrold, M. J. (2001). Prioritizing test cases for regression testing. IEEE Transactions on Software Engineering (TSE), 27(10), 929-948.
- Elbaum, S., Malishevsky, A. G., & Rothermel, G. (2002). Test case prioritization: A family of empirical studies. IEEE Transactions on Software Engineering (TSE), 28(2), 159-182.
- Do, H., Elbaum, S., & Rothermel, G. (2005). Supporting controlled experimentation with testing techniques: An infrastructure and its potential impact. Empirical Software Engineering, 10(4), 405-435.
- Elbaum, S., Rothermel, G., & Penix, J. (2014) Techniques for improving regression testing in continuous integration development environments. Proceedings of the 22nd ACM SIGSOFT International Symposium on Foundations of Software Engineering, November, 2014, 235-245
