= Xiaoming Fu =

- Born: Jiangxi, China
- Education: Northeastern University (China), Tsinghua University
- Known for: Research on networked systems, mobile and cloud computing, network security, social computing and big data
- Scientific career
- Fields: Computer Science

Xiaoming Fu (born in Jiangxi, China) is a Chinese German computer scientist. He is a Full Professor of Computer Science with focus on Internet technologies at Universität Göttingen. His research interests include architecture, protocols and applications of networked systems including mobile and cloud computing, network security, social computing and big data.

== Life ==
Fu studied at Northeastern University (China), where he received his bachelor and master degrees. He received his PhD degree from Tsinghua University, Beijing, China in 2000. After working at Technische Universität Berlin as member of scientific staff, he joined Universität Göttingen where he was appointed as assistant professor (2002) and professor (2007) and head of computer networks group.

== Awards ==
- 2009: Fulbright Scholar at UCLA Department of Computer Science
- 2014-2015: IEEE Communications Society Distinguished Lecturer
- 2017: Fellow of the Institution of Engineering and Technology
- 2018: Member of Academia Europaea
- 2021: Fellow of IEEE
- 2021: ACM Distinguished Member
- 2024: Member of acatech
