= Magy Seif El-Nasr =

American computer scientist

- Occupations: Chair of Department of Computational Media, University of California, Santa Cruz
- Website: magyel-nasr.net and guiilab.ucsc.edu

Magy Seif El-Nasr is a professor and Chair of the Department of Computational Media at the University of California, Santa Cruz. In 2024, she was appointed an endowed chair position as the UC Presidential Chair. She directs the Games User interaction and Intelligence Lab at UCSC. In January 2026, she was appointed the editor in chief of the IEEE Transactions on Games, one of the premier journals in the field of technical games research. She is recognized for her work in serious games, game design, game analytics, affective computing, and artificial intelligence.

== Early life and education ==
Seif El-Nasr earned a Bachelor of Science in Computer science from the American University in Cairo in 1995. She complete dher Master of Science in Computer Science at Texas A&M University in 1998, followed by a Doctor of Philosophy in Computer Science from Northwestern University in 2003.

== Academic career ==
Before joining UCSC, she held several academic positions, including professor and vice chair of the Serious Games Program at UCSC from 2020 to 2022, full professor at Northeastern University in 2020, and associate professor (tenured) at Northeastern University from 2011 to 2020. She was appointed assistant professor at Simon Fraser University from 2007 to 2011 and Pennsylvania State University from 2003 to 2007. Seif El-Nasr has also held teaching positions at Northwestern University and Texas A&M University.

As Chair of the Computational Media Department at UCSC, Seif El-Nasr oversees departmental budgets totaling over $4 million annually and has initiated several programs aimed at enhancing the student experience, increasing faculty diversity, and improving the department's visibility.

== Research ==
Seif El-Nasr's research focuses on serious games, game design, game data science, user experience, affective computing, and the application of artificial intelligence in interactive systems. She has published extensively in these fields, with over 130 peer-reviewed conference papers and 38 journal articles. She manages a lab of researchers, including several post-doctoral fellows, PhD students, and master's students, as well as undergraduate students and volunteers.

== Awards and honors ==
- UC Presidential Chair (2024–2027)
- ACM Distinguished Member (2024)
- HEVGA Fellow (2017)

== Funding and grants ==
Throughout her career, Seif El-Nasr has secured approximately $36.6 million in research funding from the National Science Foundation (NSF), the Natural Sciences and Engineering Research Council of Canada (NSERC), the Department of Defense (DoD), and private industry.

== Selected publications ==
=== Books ===
- Game Data Science (2021, Oxford University Press)
- Game Analytics: Maximizing the Value of Player Data (2013, Springer)

=== Research papers ===
- Habibi, Reza; Maram, Sai Siddartha; Pfau, Johannes; Wei, Jessica; Sisodiya, Shweta K.; Kashani, Atieh; Carstensdottir, Elin; Seif El-Nasr, Magy (2022). "A Data-Driven Design of AR Alternate Reality Games to Measure Resilience". HCI in Games. Lecture Notes in Computer Science. Vol. 13334. Springer International Publishing. pp. 586–604. doi:10.1007/978-3-031-05637-6_38. ISBN 978-3-031-05636-9.
- Melcer, E.; Nguyen, Truong-Huy D.; Chen, Zhengxing; Canossa, Alessandro; El-Nasr, M. S.; Isbister, Katherine (2015). "Games Research Today: Analyzing the Academic Landscape 2000-2014". International Conference on Foundations of Digital Games.
- Nguyen, Truong-Huy Dinh; El-Nasr, Magy Seif; Canossa, Alessandro (2021). "Glyph: Visualization Tool for Understanding Problem Solving Strategies in Puzzle Games". Human-Computer Interaction. arXiv:2106.13742.
- El-Nasr, Magy Seif; Horswill, Ian (2003). "Real-Time Lighting Design for Interactive Narrative". Virtual Storytelling. Using Virtual RealityTechnologies for Storytelling. Lecture Notes in Computer Science. Vol. 2897. Springer. pp. 12–20. doi:10.1007/978-3-540-40014-1_2. ISBN 978-3-540-20535-7.
- El-Nasr, Magy Seif; Yen, John; Ioerger, Thomas R. (1 September 2000). "FLAME—Fuzzy Logic Adaptive Model of Emotions". Autonomous Agents and Multi-Agent Systems. 3 (3): 219–257. doi:10.1023/A:1010030809960. ISSN 1573-7454.
