= Paul Strassmann =

American information technology executive (1929–2025)

Paul A. Strassmann
- Born: January 24, 1929; Trenčín, Czechoslovakia
- Died: April 4, 2025 (aged 96); New Canaan, Connecticut, U.S.
- Occupation: Information technology executive; author; academic
- Known for: Chief Information Officer of NASA; Director of Defense Information
- Awards: Defense Medal for Distinguished Public Service; NASA Exceptional Service Medal

Paul A. Strassmann (January 24, 1929 – April 4, 2025) was a Slovak-born American information technology executive, author and academic. He served as the first Director of Defense Information at the U.S. Department of Defense and as Chief Information Officer (CIO) at NASA. Strassmann was a pioneer in the field of information management, advocating for the measurement of information as a corporate asset and developing concepts such as "Return on Management" and "Information Productivity."

== Early life and education ==
Strassmann was born in Trenčín, Czechoslovakia (now Slovakia), to a Jewish family. During World War II, he joined the partisan resistance against Nazi occupation. After the war, he emigrated to the United States in 1948. He earned a bachelor's degree in engineering from The Cooper Union and a master's degree in industrial management from the Massachusetts Institute of Technology (MIT).

While pursuing a master's degree in industrial management at the MIT, Strassmann learned to operate a mainframe computer as part of a project aimed at forecasting traffic and determining staffing requirements for toll collectors on the New Jersey Turnpike. This work generated sufficient data for a comprehensive 600-page thesis. The experience of applying computers to address complex business challenges and improve organizational efficiency would become a defining aspect of his subsequent career.

== Career ==
=== Corporate roles ===
Strassmann began his corporate career at General Foods in 1961 and later became Chief Information Systems Executive at Kraft Foods. In 1969, he joined Xerox Corporation as Director of Administration and Information Systems. He later served as Vice President of Strategic Planning for Xerox’s Information Products Group. He founded and managed Xerox's Information Services Division, overseeing computer centers, software development, and management consulting services.

=== Government service ===
In 1991, Strassmann was appointed the first Director of Defense Information at the U.S. Department of Defense, managing the Corporate Information Management program. He received the Defense Medal for Distinguished Public Service in 1993.

In 2002, he became Acting Chief Information Officer at NASA, where he oversaw the agency’s information systems and telecommunications. He received the NASA Exceptional Service Medal in 2003.

=== Academic and consulting work ===
After his government service, Strassmann taught as a Distinguished Professor of Information Sciences at George Mason University and held visiting positions at the National Defense University and the United States Military Academy at West Point.

== Awards and honors ==
In 2009, he was elected an ACM Distinguished Member. He also received the Defense Medal for Distinguished Public Service and NASA Exceptional Service Medal.

== Publications ==
Strassmann wrote nine books and over 500 articles on information technology and management. Notable titles include:

- Information Payoff: The Transformation of Work in the Electronic Age (1985)
- The Squandered Computer: Evaluating the Business Alignment of Information Technologies (1997)
- My March to Liberation: A Jewish Boy’s Story of Partizan Warfare (2008)

== Personal life and death ==
Strassmann was married to Mona Frankel for 68 years. They had several children and grandchildren. He died at his home in New Canaan, Connecticut, on April 4, 2025, at the age of 96.

== Legacy ==
Strassmann's contributions to the field of information economics and his influence on IT governance are widely recognized. His ideas on measuring the business value of IT have influenced industry leaders, including Steve Jobs.
