= Latifur Khan =

Latifur R. Khan
- Education: Bangladesh University of Engineering and Technology; University of Southern California
- Scientific career
- Fields: Big Data, Data Mining, Semantic Web, Complexity
- Workplaces: University of Texas at Dallas
- Website: Latifur R. Khan

Latifur Khan joined the University of Texas at Dallas in 2000, where he has been conducting research and teaching as a professor in the Department of Computer Science.

== Education ==
Khan has received his B.Sc. in computer science from Bangladesh University of Engineering and Technology in 1993. He has done his M.Sc. degree in computer science at the University of Southern California in 1996. He has also earned his Ph.D. in computer science from the University of Southern California in 2000.

== Career ==
Khan is working as a professor of computer science, in the Erik Jonsson School of Engineering and Computer Science at The University of Texas at Dallas since 2012. He initially joined the University of Texas at Dallas in 2000 and has held the title of professor, associate professor and assistant professor. Khan has primarily done research in the fields of big data management, data mining, multimedia information management and semantic web and has published over 300 papers in 40 journals, in peer-reviewed conference proceedings, and in three books.

== Awards and honors ==
- IEEE Fellow 2022
- IEEE Technical Achievement Award, 2012
- ACM Distinguished Member, 2012
- NSF award for MRI: Development of an Instrument for Assured Cloud Computing, 2012
- IBM Faculty Award (Research), 2016
- NSF award for Secure and Privacy Preserving Big Data Analytics Curriculum Development, 2017
- Fellow of British Computer Society (BCS)
- Fellow of Institution of Engineering and Technology (IET), UK
- Associate editor IEEE Transactions on Artificial Intelligence, ACM Transactions on Knowledge Discovery from Data (TKDD), and ACM transaction on Internet Technology (TOIT). These recognitions clearly demonstrate the quality of his work and authoritativeness in data mining area.

== Books authored ==
- Design and Implementation of Data Mining Tools.
- Data Mining Tools for Malware Detection.
- Big Data Analytics with Applications in Insider Threat Detection.
- Analyzing and Securing Social Networks.
- Multimedia Data Mining and Knowledge Discovery
