= Eric Bodden =

German computer scientist

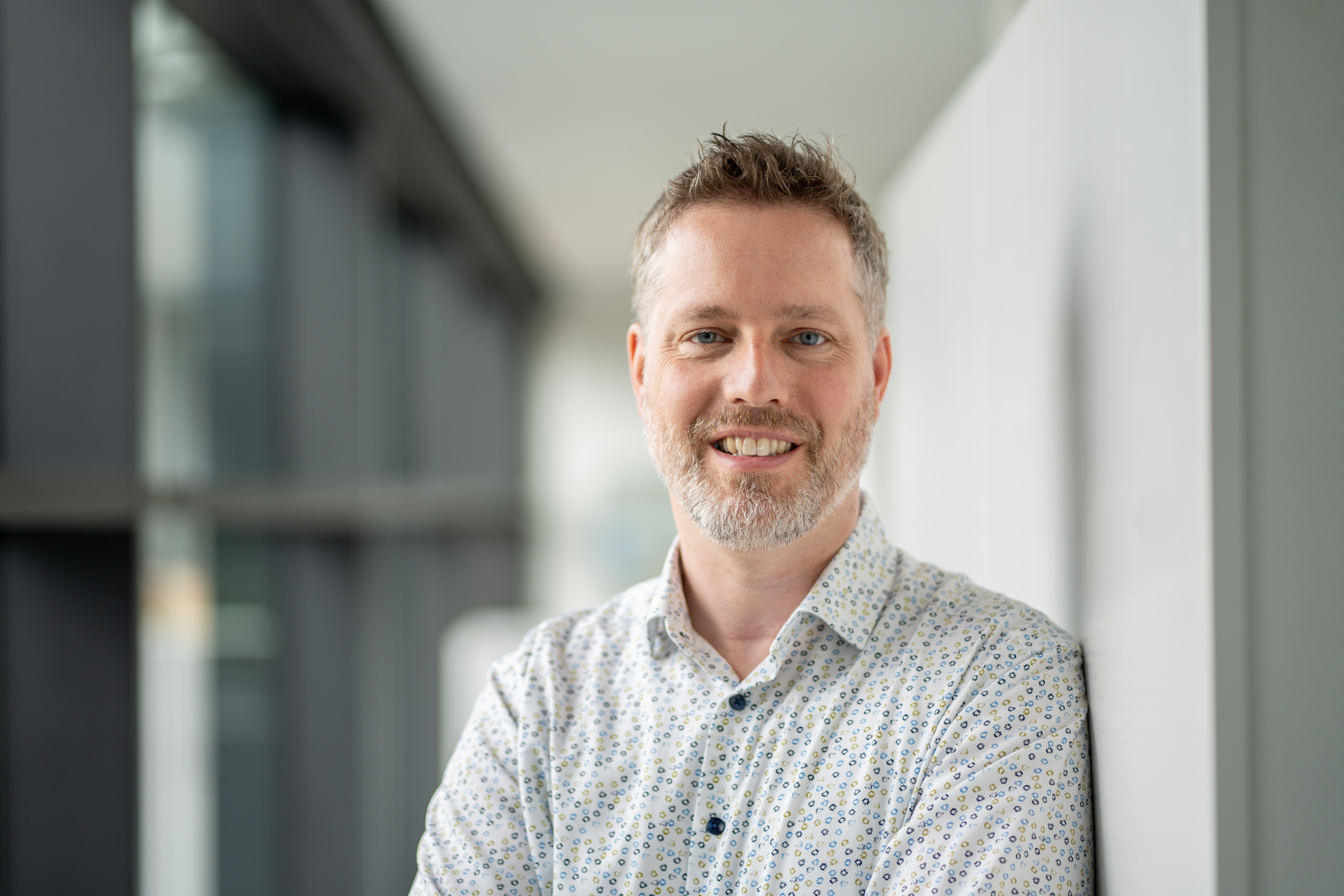
- Bodden in 2024
- Born: 1980 (age 45–46); Aachen, Germany
- Occupation: Computer scientist

Academic background
- Education: RWTH Aachen University; McGill University

Eric Bodden (born 1980 in Aachen) is a German computer scientist. He holds the Chair of Secure Software Engineering at the Heinz Nixdorf Institute of the Paderborn University and is Director of Software Engineering and IT Security at the Fraunhofer Institute for Mechatronic Design (IEM). He is also head of the engineering department in the Collaborative Research Centre 1119 CROSSING at the Technical University of Darmstadt.

== Career ==
Bodden's undergraduate studies consist of a computer science degree at RWTH Aachen University with an exchange year at the University of Kent. His diploma thesis won the 2005 undergraduate category of the ACM Student Research Competition. From 2006 to 2009, Bodden did a PhD at McGill University.

From 2009 to 2015, Eric Bodden worked at the Technische Universität Darmstadt. Since the summer of 2013, Bodden has held a cooperative professorship at the Fraunhofer Institute for Secure Information Technology and the Technische Universität Darmstadt.

Since 2016, Bodden has worked at the Heinz Nixdorf Institute at the University of Paderborn and been a director for software engineering and IT security at the Fraunhofer Institute for Mechatronic Systems Design, a research institute of the Fraunhofer Society.

== Awards ==
Bodden is a member of Acatech, the BITKOM Management Club, and the Gesellschaft für Informatik.

In 2024, the European Research Council awarded Bodden an ERC Advanced Grant on Self-Optimizing Static Program Analysis. In 2014, Eric Bodden received the Heinz Maier Leibnitz Prize of the German Research Foundation. The Technische Universität Darmstadt team placed second in the 2014 German IT Security Award from the Horst Görtz Foundation and the first place in 2016. In 2019, Bodden was named an ACM Distinguished Member. Five of his publications have received the ACM Distinguished Paper Award. Three of his previous doctoral students received the Ernst Denert Prize for Software Engineering.
