= Jian Tang =

Chinese-American electrical engineer

Jian Tang is a professor of computer science at Syracuse University.

Tang earned his PhD in Computer Science in 2006 from the Ira A. Fulton School of Engineering of Arizona State University.

He was named a Fellow of the Institute of Electrical and Electronics Engineers (IEEE) in 2019 for his contributions to optimization in wireless networks and mobile crowdsourcing systems. In the same year, he was elected an ACM Distinguished Member.
