= Krishna Sivalingam =

Computer scientist

Krishna Sivalingam is an Institute Chair Professor at the Department of Computer Science and Engineering, IIT Madras, Chennai, India.

== Education and career ==
Sivalingam obtained his B.E. degree in computer science and engineering in 1988 from College of Engineering, Guindy and then did his M.S. and Ph.D. degrees in computer science at the University at Buffalo in 1990 and 1994 respectively. While at Buffalo State, he served as Presidential Fellow from 1988 to 1991.

As an editor, he has served as the editor-in-chief for Springer Photonic Network Communications Journal and the EAI Endorsed Transactions on Future Internet. He has served as a member of the Editorial Board for several international journals including IEEE Transactions on Mobile Computing, the ACM/Springer Wireless Networks Journal and Elsevier's Optical Switching and Networking Journal.

He has served on the Steering Committee of IEEE International Conference on Advanced Networks and Telecommunications Systems (ANTS) and ICST International Conference on Mobile and Ubiquitous Systems: Computing, Networking and Services (MobiQuitous).

== Awards and honors ==
He was named an IEEE Fellow in 2014 for contributions to medium access control and energy-efficient protocol design in communication networks. In the same year, he was elected an ACM Distinguished Member.
