= Stefano Lonardi =

American computer scientist

- Born: 1968 (age 57–58); Verona, Italy
- Citizenship: United States, Italy
- Education: Purdue University
- Awards: IEEE Fellow, AAAS Fellow, ACM Distinguished Member
- Scientific career
- Fields: Computer science, Bioinformatics
- Workplaces: University of California, Riverside, Celera Genomics
- Thesis: Global Detectors of Unusual Words: Design, Implementation, and Applications to Pattern Discovery in Biosequences (2001)
- Doctoral advisor: Alberto Apostolico
- Website: www.cs.ucr.edu/~stelo/

Stefano Lonardi is an Italian computer scientist and bioinformatician, currently Professor and Vice Chair of the Department of Computer Science and Engineering at University of California, Riverside. He is also a faculty member of the Graduate Program in Genetics, Genomics and Bioinformatics, the Center for Plant Cell Biology, the Institute for Integrative Genome Biology, and the Graduate Program in Cell, Molecular and Developmental Biology.

== Education ==
Stefano received his Ph.D. from the Department of Computer Sciences, Purdue University, West Lafayette, IN. He also holds a doctorate degree in Electrical and Information Engineering from University of Padua, Italy. During the summer of 1999, he was intern at Celera Genomics.

== Research interests ==
Stefano's research interests include computational molecular biology, bioinformatics, epigenetics, genomics, and data science. He has published about 100 journal articles and 70 peer-reviewed conference papers in these disciplines.

== Awards and honors ==
He received the National Science Foundation CAREER Award in 2005. He is a IEEE Fellow for contributions to computational biology and data mining. He was named an ACM Distinguished Member. for contributions to computational biology. He was named AAAS Fellow. And he received the NIH Director's Transformative Research Award in 2021.

Stefano has received research funding from National Science Foundation, Department of Energy, National Institutes of Health, Defense Advanced Research Projects Agency, United States Agency for International Development, United States Department of Energy and United States Department of Agriculture.
