= Evgenia Smirni =

Greek-American computer scientist

Evgenia Smirni is a Greek-American computer scientist, the Sidney P. Chockley Professor of Computer Science and Computer Science Chair at the College of William & Mary. Her research concerns computer performance evaluation, load balancing, dynamic resource provisioning, and the matrix analytic method for Markov chains.

== Education and career ==
Smirni earned a diploma in computer engineering and informatics from the University of Patras in 1988. She went to Vanderbilt University for graduate study, completing her Ph.D. there in 1995. Her dissertation, Processor Allocation and Thread Placement Policies in Parallel Multiprocessor Systems, was supervised by Larry Dowdy.

After postdoctoral research at the University of Illinois at Urbana–Champaign, she joined the faculty of the College of William & Mary as an assistant professor in 1997. She earned tenure as an associate professor in 2002 and was promoted to full professor in 2008.

At the College of William & Mary, Smirni has been involved in encouraging women to participate in computer science, and although the discipline has proportionately fewer women than other subjects at the college, it is less unbalanced than the national averages. She is the faculty sponsor for the college's chapter of ACM-W, an organization for women in computing.

== Awards and honors ==
Smirni was elected an ACM Distinguished Member in 2013. Smirni was named Sidney P. Chockley Professor in 2014. She became an IEEE Fellow in 2020, "for contributions to modeling and performance forecasting of complex systems". Her term as computer science chair began in 2022.
