= Jeffrey Vetter =

American computer scientist

Jeffrey S. Vetter
- Education: Georgia Tech
- Known for: High performance computing; Extreme heterogeneity; Systems programming
- Awards: IEEE Fellow (2017); ACM Distinguished Member (2012)
- Scientific career
- Fields: Distributed computing; Cyberinfrastructure; Scientific workflow systems.; High performance computing; Reproducibility
- Workplaces: Oak Ridge National Laboratory
- Academic advisors: Karsten Schwan
- Website: ft.ornl.gov/~vetter/

Jeffrey S. Vetter is a Corporate Fellow of computer science and mathematics, and the founding group leader at the Future Technologies Group in the Computer Science and Mathematics Division of Oak Ridge National Laboratory.

== Education ==
Vetter attended Georgia Tech where he obtained his Ph.D. in computer science.

== Research ==
His current research interests include scientific workflow systems, cloud computing, resource management, with particular emphasis on scientific workflow system management.

== Honors ==
Vetter is an IEEE Fellow and an ACM Distinguished Member.
