= Kui Ren =

Engineer

Kui Ren is an engineer at the State University of New York, Buffalo. He was named a Fellow of the Institute of Electrical and Electronics Engineers (IEEE) in 2016 for his contributions to security and privacy in cloud computing and wireless networks. In 2017, he was elected an ACM Distinguished Member.
