= Shiuhpyng Shieh =

Shiuhpyng Shieh is a researcher at the National Chiao Tung University.

In 2010, he was elected an ACM Distinguished Member. He was named an IEEE Fellow in 2014 "for advances in pattern-oriented intrusion detection and fault-tolerant protection". He is currently the Editor-in-Chief of IEEE Transactions on Reliability.
