= Cynthia A. Phillips =

American mathematician

Cynthia A. Phillips is a researcher at the Center for Computing Research of Sandia National Laboratories, known for her work in combinatorial optimization.

== Education ==
Phillips earned a bachelor's degree in applied mathematics from the Massachusetts Institute of Technology (MIT) in 1983, a master's degree in electrical engineering and computer science from MIT in 1985, and a doctorate in computer science from MIT in 1990. Her dissertation, on parallel algorithms, was supervised by Charles Leiserson.

== Recognition ==
In 2015, she became an ACM Distinguished Member. She became a Fellow of the Society for Industrial and Applied Mathematics in 2016 "for contributions to the theory and applications of combinatorial optimization". She was selected a Sandia Lab Fellow in 2022.
