= Myra B. Cohen =

American software engineer

- Education: Cornell University, University of Vermont, University of Auckland
- Occupation: Software engineer
- Employer: Iowa State University
- Known for: Professor in Software Engineering at Iowa State University, Professor Emeritus of Computer Science and Engineering at the University of Nebraska–Lincoln
- Notable work: Designing Test Suites for Software Interaction Testing

Myra B. Cohen is an American software engineer whose research focuses on software testing. She is Susan J. Rosowski Professor Emeritus of Computer Science and Engineering at the University of Nebraska–Lincoln, and Professor and Lanh and Oanh Nguyen Chair in Software Engineering at Iowa State University.

== Education ==
Cohen is originally from New York City. After studying agriculture and life sciences at Cornell University, she became interested in computer science through working as a data analyst for a hospital. She went to the University of Vermont for graduate study in computer science, and earned a master's degree there in 1999. Cohen completed a Ph.D. at the University of Auckland in New Zealand in 2004. Her dissertation, Designing Test Suites for Software Interaction Testing, was supervised by Peter Gibbons.

== Career ==
After completing her doctorate, she became an assistant professor at the University of Nebraska–Lincoln. In 2016, she was named the Susan J. Rosowski Professor there. She took her present position at Iowa State University in 2018.

== Awards and honors ==
- 2017: ACM Distinguished Member
