= Shari Trewin =

Computer scientist

Shari Trewin is a computer scientist specializing in human–computer interaction, and known for her research on accessibility and on algorithmic bias against people with disabilities. Educated in Scotland, she works in the US for the Google accessibility team.

Trewin has a 1998 Ph.D. from the University of Edinburgh, on the use of computer user interfaces by people with disabilities, supervised by Helen Pain. She joined IBM Research in 2000, becoming program director for IBM Accessibility before moving to Google. She chaired SIGACCESS, the special interest group on accessible computing of the Association for Computing Machinery (ACM), from 2015 until 2021.

Trewin was named as a distinguished member of the ACM in 2011.
