= Cristina Conati =

Italian and Canadian computer scientist

Cristina Conati is an Italian and Canadian computer scientist specializing in artificial intelligence and computer-human interaction. She is a professor of computer science at the University of British Columbia, and has served as president of the Association for the Advancement of Affective Computing.

== Education ==
Conati earned a master's degree in computer science from the University of Milan in 1988, and a Ph.D. from the University of Pittsburgh in 1999. Her dissertation, An intelligent computer tutor to guide self-explanation while learning from examples, was supervised by Kurt VanLehn.

== Career ==
She joined the University of British Columbia faculty in 1999, and became a full professor there in 2016.

With Yukiko Nakano and Thomas Bader, Conati is an editor of the book Eye Gaze in Intelligent User Interfaces: Gaze-based Analyses, Models and Applications (Springer, 2013).

== Awards and honors ==
In 2020, she was elected an ACM Distinguished Member. and in 2024 became an AAAI Fellow. She was elected as an ACM Fellow, in the 2025 class of fellows, "for contributions to research in Human-AI interaction and AI-driven personalization".
