= Danfeng Yao =

Chinese-American computer scientist

Danfeng (Daphne) Yao is a Chinese American computer scientist whose research interests include cybersecurity and anomaly detection as well as machine learning in digital health. She is a professor of computer science, Elizabeth and James E. Turner Jr. '56 Faculty Fellow, and CACI Faculty Fellow at Virginia Tech.

== Education and career ==
Yao initially studied chemistry as an undergraduate at Peking University, where she received a bachelor's degree in 1998, and at Princeton University, where she received a master's degree in 2000. After switching fields to computer science, she received a master's degree from Indiana University Bloomington in 2002. She completed a Ph.D. in 2007 at Brown University, with the dissertation Privacy-Aware Authentication and Authorization in Trust Management supervised by Roberto Tamassia.

She joined Rutgers University as an assistant professor of computer science in 2008, at the same time becoming a member of DIMACS. She moved from Rutgers to Virginia Tech in 2010, was promoted to associate professor in 2014, and was promoted to full professor in 2019. Also in 2019, she was named as an Elizabeth and James E. Turner Jr. '56 Faculty Fellow and CACI Faculty Fellow.

== Recognition ==
Yao was elected as an IEEE Fellow in 2023, honored "for contributions to enterprise data security and high-precision vulnerability screening". She was named as a Fellow of the American Association for the Advancement of Science in the 2025 class of fellows. She also joined the National Academy of Inventors in 2025.

Yao was the recipient of the Lasting Research Award of the 11th ACM Conference on Data and Application Security and Privacy (ACM CODASPY 2021), recognized "for pioneering research contributions sustained for around over two decades in enterprise data exposure detection, high-precision vulnerability screening, and anomaly detection".
