= Sudip Misra =

Computer scientist

Sudip Misra is an Indian computer scientist and professor at the Department of Computer Science and Engineering, Indian Institute of Technology (IIT) Kharagpur. He is known for his work in the fields of Internet of Things (IoT) and Wireless Sensor Networks. In 2025, Misra was elected a Fellow of the Association for Computing Machinery (ACM) and become the only Indian academic to receive the distinction that year. He is also a Fellow of the Institute of Electrical and Electronics Engineers (IEEE) (2022).

== Education and career ==
Misra completed his undergraduate studies at IIT Kharagpur. He obtained a Master of Computer Science from the University of New Brunswick, Canada, and later earned a Ph.D. in Computer Science from Carleton University, Ottawa, Canada. His doctoral research focused on Computer Networks.

He joined IIT Kharagpur as an assistant professor in 2007, became an associate professor in 2013, and was promoted to professor in 2018. He established the Smart Wireless Applications & Networking (SWAN) Lab at IIT Kharagpur, which conducts research in IoT and wireless communication. He has delivered keynote lectures at international conferences across North America, Europe, Asia, and Africa.

== Research and recognition ==
Misra’s research includes the development of scalable and energy-efficient IoT frameworks, intelligent networked sensing systems, and AI-driven automation in IoT environments. Several technology prototypes developed under his guidance include AmbuSens, EpiOne, SkopEdge, AgriSens, IndustryEdge, and PowerEdge, the details of which are available through his startup company, SensorDrops Networks Pvt Ltd.

He has taught courses on IoT, wireless sensor networks, and industrial IoT. He has also developed massive open online course MOOCs on these subjects.

In 2023, he was awarded the ACM Outstanding Contributions to Computing Education Award. A team he mentored won the Gandhian Young Technological Innovation Award in 2018. He also was awarded the IEEE India Council Outstanding Volunteer Award in 2021. He has also received multiple Best Paper Awards at national and international conferences, including IEEE GLOBECOM and IEEE HEALTHCOM.

He has also been elected as a fellow of various professional organizations, including:

- Association for Computing Machinery (ACM), 2024.
- Asia-Pacific Artificial Intelligence Association (AAIA), 2022.
- Institute of Electrical and Electronics Engineers (IEEE), 2021.
- Indian National Academy of Engineering (INAE), 2019.
- National Academy of Sciences India (NASI), 2017.
- Institution of Engineering and Technology (IET), UK, 2018.
- British Computer Society (BCS), UK, 2019.
- Royal Society of Public Health (RSPH), UK, 2018.
- Institution of Electronics and Telecommunications Engineers (IETE), India, 2014.
- West Bengal Academy of Science and Technology (WAST), 2023.

== Books ==
- Introduction to IoT, Cambridge University Press.
- Introduction to Industrial Internet of Things and Industry 4.0, Chapman and Hall/CRC.
- Sensors, cloud, and fog : the enabling technologies for the internet of things, Chapman and Hall/CRC.
- Smart Grid Technology: A Cloud Computing and Data Management Approach, Cambridge University Press.
- Network Routing: Fundamentals, Applications, and Emerging Technologies, John Wiley & Sons.
- Opportunistic Mobile Networks: Advances and Applications, Springer
- Principles of Wireless Sensor Networks, Cambridge University Press
