= Ricardo Bianchini =

Brazilian computer scientist

- Born: Rio de Janeiro, Brazil
- Education: University of Rochester (PhD)
- Awards: ACM Fellow, IEEE Fellow
- Scientific career
- Fields: Computer science
- Workplaces: Microsoft Research; Rutgers University

Ricardo Bianchini is a computer scientist specializing in server and data center power and energy management. He currently serves as a Technical Fellow and Corporate Vice President at Microsoft Azure, where he leads the Azure Compute Capacity and Efficiency group. His work focuses on enhancing the efficiency and sustainability of Microsoft's online services and datacenters.

Bianchini was named an IEEE Fellow in 2015 for contributions to server and data center energy management. He was named an ACM Fellow in 2016 for contributions to power, energy and thermal management of servers and datacenters. He has published fourteen award papers and received the CAREER award from the National Science Foundation.

== Education ==
Bianchini received a PhD from the University of Rochester in the Hajim School of Engineering & Applied Sciences in 1995.

From 1995 to 1999, he was a Research Associate and Assistant Professor of Computer Science at the Federal University of Rio de Janeiro.

== Professional contributions ==
Bianchini was a Professor of Computer Science at Rutgers University from 2000 to 2015. In 2014 he started at Microsoft as its Chief Efficiency Strategist, became a Distinguished Engineer in the Microsoft Research group and then in the Azure group. He is now a Technical Fellow and Corporate VP at Microsoft. Bianchini has served as a program chair, steering committee member, and keynote speaker for many academic conferences including ASPLOS, Eurosys, and ICDS.

== Awards and honors ==
- 2014: Chief Efficiency Strategist, Microsoft
- 2015: IEEE Fellow for contributions to server and data center energy management
- 2016: ACM Fellow for contributions to power, energy and thermal management of servers and datacenters

== Selected publications ==
- Anant Agarwal, Ricardo Bianchini, David Chaiken, Kirk L Johnson, David Kranz, John Kubiatowicz, Beng-Hong Lim, Kenneth Mackenzie, Donald Yeung "The MIT Alewife Machine: Architecture and Performance" (1995)
- Eduardo Pinheiro, Ricardo Bianchini, Enrique V Carrera, Taliver Heath "Load balancing and unbalancing for power and performance in cluster-based systems" (2001)
- Eli Cortez, Anand Bonde, Alexandre Muzio, Mark Russinovich, Marcus Fontoura, Ricardo Bianchini "Resource central: Understanding and predicting workloads for improved resource management in large cloud platforms" (2017)
- Pratyush Patel, Esha Choukse, Chaojie Zhang, Íñigo Goiri, Brijesh Warrier, Nithish Mahalingam, Ricardo Bianchini "Characterizing Power Management Opportunities for LLMs in the Cloud" (2024)
