= Zi Helen Huang =

Chinese-Australian computer scientist

Zi Helen Huang is a Chinese and Australian computer scientist whose research focuses on processing multimedia data, including multimedia information retrieval and multimedia search, social data analysis, and knowledge extraction. She is a professor in the University of Queensland School of Electrical Engineering and Computer Science, where she is discipline leader for data science.

Huang has a 2001 bachelor's degree in computer science from Tsinghua University. She completed a Ph.D. in 2007 from the University of Queensland School of Information Technology and Electrical Engineering.

Huang was named as an IEEE Fellow in 2025, "for contributions to multi-modal data management". She was also elected as an ACM Fellow, in the 2025 class of fellows, "for contributions to large-scale multimedia content understanding, indexing and retrieval".
