= Schahram Dustdar =

Austrian computer scientist

Schahram Dustdar is an Austrian computer scientist known for his work on distributed systems and elastic computing. Dustdar is a professor of computer science and head of the Distributed Systems Group at TU Wien.

In 2009, he was elected an ACM Distinguished Member. He was named Fellow of the Institute of Electrical and Electronics Engineers (IEEE) in 2016 "for contributions to elastic computing for cloud applications."
