= Corina Păsăreanu =

Romanian-American computer scientist

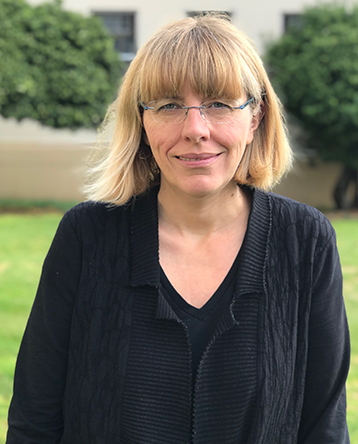
Corina Pasareanu

Corina S. Păsăreanu is a Romanian-American computer scientist with affiliations at the NASA Ames Research Center, with the Carnegie Mellon University CyLab Security and Privacy Institute, and with KBR. Her research involves formal methods, including symbolic execution and the verification of systems of interacting components. She is the author of the book Symbolic Execution and Quantitative Reasoning: Applications to Software Safety and Security (Springer, 2022).

== Education ==
Păsăreanu studied computer science at the Politehnica University of Bucharest, where she earned a bachelor's degree in 1994 and a master's degree in 1995. She earned her Ph.D. in 2001, at Kansas State University, with the dissertation Abstraction and Modular Reasoning for the Verification of Software supervised by Matthew B. Dwyer.

== Recognition ==
In 2010, a paper coauthored by Păsăreanu in 1998 on extracting finite-state models from compiled computer code, suitable for use in model checking, won the Most Influential Paper Award from the International Conference on Software Engineering.

Păsăreanu was named as an ACM Fellow, in the 2023 class of fellows, for "contributions to the development and application of symbolic execution and compositional verification".
