= Naehyuck Chang =

South Korean electrical engineer

Naehyuck Chang is a Professor of electrical engineering at KAIST, Seoul, Korea.

Chang obtained his BS, MS, and PhD degrees from the Department of Control and Instrumentation at Seoul National University, of which he later became faculty member and later served as Vice Dean of its College of Engineering. In 2012, Chang was elected as chair of a Special Interest Group within the Association for Computing Machinery.

Chang was named an IEEE Fellow in 2012 for contributions to system-level power characterization, including thermal management and in 2015 he was named an ACM Fellow by the Association for Computing Machinery.
