= Valeria Bertacco =

Academic and researcher in electrical engineering and computer science

- Education: Stanford University (M.S., PhD); University of Padova
- Honors: IEEE Fellow; ACM Distinguished Member

Valeria Bertacco is a professor of Electrical Engineering and Computer Science as well as Vice Provost for Engaged Learning at the University of Michigan. She previously served as the Associate Dean for Academic Programs and Initiatives at the University of Michigan Rackham Graduate School.

Bertacco headed the Center for Applications Driving Architectures (ADA) at the University of Michigan. Her work at the center includes leading initiatives to design processors that are especially tailored to run specific algorithms.

In 2014, she became an ACM Distinguished Member. In 2017, she was elected an IEEE Fellow for her contributions to Computer-aided Verification and Reliable System Design.
