= Lin Tan =

Chinese computer scientist

Lin Tan is a Chinese computer scientist and software engineering researcher whose intererests include software reliability, the application of text analytics to comments in computer code, and AI-assisted software development. She works at Purdue University as Mary J. Elmore New Frontiers Professor of Computer Science and as a Purdue University Faculty Scholar.

== Education and career ==
Tan has a 2003 bachelor's degree from Zhejiang University. She completed her Ph.D. in 2009 at the University of Illinois Urbana-Champaign with the dissertation Leveraging code comments to improve software reliability supervised by Yuanyuan Zhou.

She held a Canada Research Chair as an associate professor at the University of Waterloo before moving the Purdue University in 2019. She was given the Mary J. Elmore New Frontiers chair as an associate professor in 2020, promoted to full professor in 2022, and named as a University Faculty Scholar in 2025.

== Recognition ==
In 2021 the Siebler School of Computing and Data Science at the University of Illinois Urbana-Champaign gave Tan their Early Career Academic Achievement Alumni Award. She was named to the 2026 class of IEEE Fellows, "for contributions to software text analytics, software-AI synergy, and software reliability".
