= David R. Kaeli =

American computer scientist

David R. Kaeli is an American computer scientist and Northeastern University College of Engineering Distinguished Professor in Electrical and Computer Engineering. He has been cited over 13,000 times. His research involves the design and performance of high-performance computer systems and software.

== Early life ==
Kaeli received a B.S. in electrical engineering from Rutgers University, an M.S. in Computer Engineering from Syracuse University, and a Ph.D. in electrical engineering at Rutgers University. He worked for 12 years at IBM before moving to academia. He is presently a College of Engineering Distinguished Professor in the Department of Electrical and Computer Engineering at Northeastern University. He is also an honorary professor at City University of London.

Kaeli served two terms as the Editor-in-Chief for ACM Transactions on Architecture and Code Optimization. He has also served two terms as the Chair of the IEEE Technical Committee on Computer Architecture (TCCA). He is a Fellow of the ACM and the IEEE.

== Selected research ==
- Kaeli, David R. and Emma, Phillip G. "Branch history table prediction of moving target branches due to subroutine returns" 1991 ACM/IEEE International Symposium on Computer Architecture (ISCA), 34-42.
- Kaeli, David R., et al. Heterogeneous computing with OpenCL 2.0. Morgan Kaufmann, 2015.
- Ubal, Rafael, et al. "Multi2Sim: a simulation framework for CPU-GPU computing." 2012 21st International Conference on Parallel Architectures and Compilation Techniques (PACT), IEEE, 2012.
- Jang, Byunghyun, et al. "Exploiting memory access patterns to improve memory performance in data-parallel architectures." IEEE Transactions on Parallel and Distributed Systems 22.1 (2010): 105-118.
- Sridharan, Vilas and Kaeli, David R. "Eliminating microarchitectural dependency from architectural vulnerability." 2009 15th IEEE International Symposium on High Performance Computer Architecture (HPCA), 117-128.
