= Prashant Shenoy =

American computer scientist

- Born: India
- Education: University of Texas at Austin; Indian Institute of Technology Bombay
- Known for: Multimedia systems Cloud resource management Energy Informatics
- Scientific career
- Fields: Distributed Systems; Computer Science
- Workplaces: University of Massachusetts, Amherst
- Thesis: Symphony: An Integrated Multimedia File System (1998)
- Doctoral advisor: Harrick M. Vin
- Website: www.cs.umass.edu/~shenoy

Prashant Shenoy (born 1972) is an Indian-American Computer Scientist. He is a Distinguished Professor of Computer Science in the College of Information and Computer Sciences at the University of Massachusetts Amherst. He is known for his contributions to distributed computing, computer networks, cloud computing, and computational sustainability.

== Education ==
Shenoy received his Bachelor of Technology degree in Computer Science and Engineering in 1993 from the Indian Institute of Technology Bombay. He received his MS and Ph.D. degree in Computer Science from the University of Texas at Austin in 1994 and 1998, where he was advised by Harrick M. Vin. His doctoral thesis research received the Best Dissertation award by the Department of Computer Sciences at the University of Texas in 1999.

== Career and Research ==
Shenoy joined the University of Massachusetts as an assistant professor in 1998. He is currently a Distinguished Professor of Computer Science and an Associate Dean in the College of Information and Computer Science at the University of Massachusetts Amherst.

Shenoy's early research focused on the design of video-on-demand servers, and is known for his work on efficient storage techniques for multimedia servers. Later, he worked on dynamic resource management and elastic scaling for cloud computing platforms. He is known for his contributions to the elastic scaling of web applications and design of transient computing techniques for cloud applications. His current research is focused on cyber-physical systems, Internet of Things, edge computing, and computational sustainability.

== Service and awards ==
Shenoy was elected an IEEE Fellow in 2013 "for contributions to the design and analysis of distributed systems and computer networking." He was elected as an AAAS Fellow in 2018 "for distinguished contributions to the field of distributed computing systems." He was elected as an ACM Fellow in 2019 "for contributions to the modeling and design of distributed computing systems."

Shenoy received the Test of Time award from ACM Sigmetrics for his work on analytic modeling of multi-tier web application in 2016. He received the National Science Foundation's CAREER award in 1999.

Shenoy co-founded and chairs the ACM Special Interest Group on Energy (SIGEnergy) in 2020, a professional group focused on computing aspects of energy and sustainability.
