= SIGCSE Award for Outstanding Contribution to Computer Science Education =

SIGCSE Outstanding Contribution to Computer Science Education
- Awarded for: significant contribution to computer science education
- Presented by: SIGCSE
- Website: sigcse.org/programs/awards/outstanding.html

The Outstanding Contribution to Computer Science Education award is a prize granted by the Association for Computing Machinery (ACM) Special Interest Group (SIG) on Computer science education (SIGCSE). Outstanding contributions can include curriculum design, innovative teaching methods, authorship of textbooks, and the development of novel teaching tools. The award has been granted annually since 1981. The SIGCSE website contains more information about the awardees.

== Laureates ==
- 2025: Mitchel Resnick
- 2024: Michael Caspersen
- 2023: Susan Rodger
- 2022: Barbara Ericson
- 2021: Stephen H. Edwards
- 2020: Lauri Malmi
- 2019: Mark Guzdial
- 2018: Tim Bell
- 2017: Gail Chapman
- 2016: Janice E. Cuny
- 2015: Mark Allen Weiss
- 2014: Robert Panoff
- 2013: Michael Kolling
- 2012: Harold Abelson
- 2011: Matthias Felleisen
- 2010: Sally Fincher
- 2009: Elliot Koffman
- 2008: Randy Pausch
- 2007: Judith Gal-Ezer
- 2007: John Hughes
- 2006: Richard Pattis
- 2005: Kim Bruce
- 2004: Mordechai Ben-Ari
- 2003: Eric S. Roberts
- 2002: Elliot Soloway
- 2001: Allen B. Tucker
- 2000: Andries van Dam
- 1999: Peter J. Denning
- 1998: William Wulf
- 1997: Andrew Tanenbaum
- 1996: Nell B. Dale
- 1995: Robert Aiken
- 1994: Norman Gibbs
- 1993: Alan Kay
- 1992: Daniel McCracken
- 1991: David Gries
- 1990: Curriculum 1968 Committee
- 1989: Edsger Dijkstra
- 1988: Grace Murray Hopper
- 1987: Niklaus Wirth
- 1986: Donald Knuth
- 1985: Elliot Organick
- 1984: Karl Karlstrom
- 1982: Alan Perlis
- 1981: William Atchison
