= Michael Kölling =

German computer scientist

Michael Kölling FBCS
- Born: Bremen, Germany
- Education: University of Bremen; University of Sydney (PhD)
- Known for: BlueJ; Greenfoot
- Awards: SIGCSE Award for Outstanding Contribution to Computer Science Education (2013); National Teaching Fellowship (2008); Pearcey Award (1999)
- Scientific career
- Fields: Computer science education Programming languages
- Workplaces: King's College London; University of Kent; University of Sydney; Monash University; University of Southern Denmark
- Thesis: The design of an object-oriented environment and language for teaching (1999)
- Doctoral advisor: John Rosenberg
- Website: nms.kcl.ac.uk/michael.kolling/

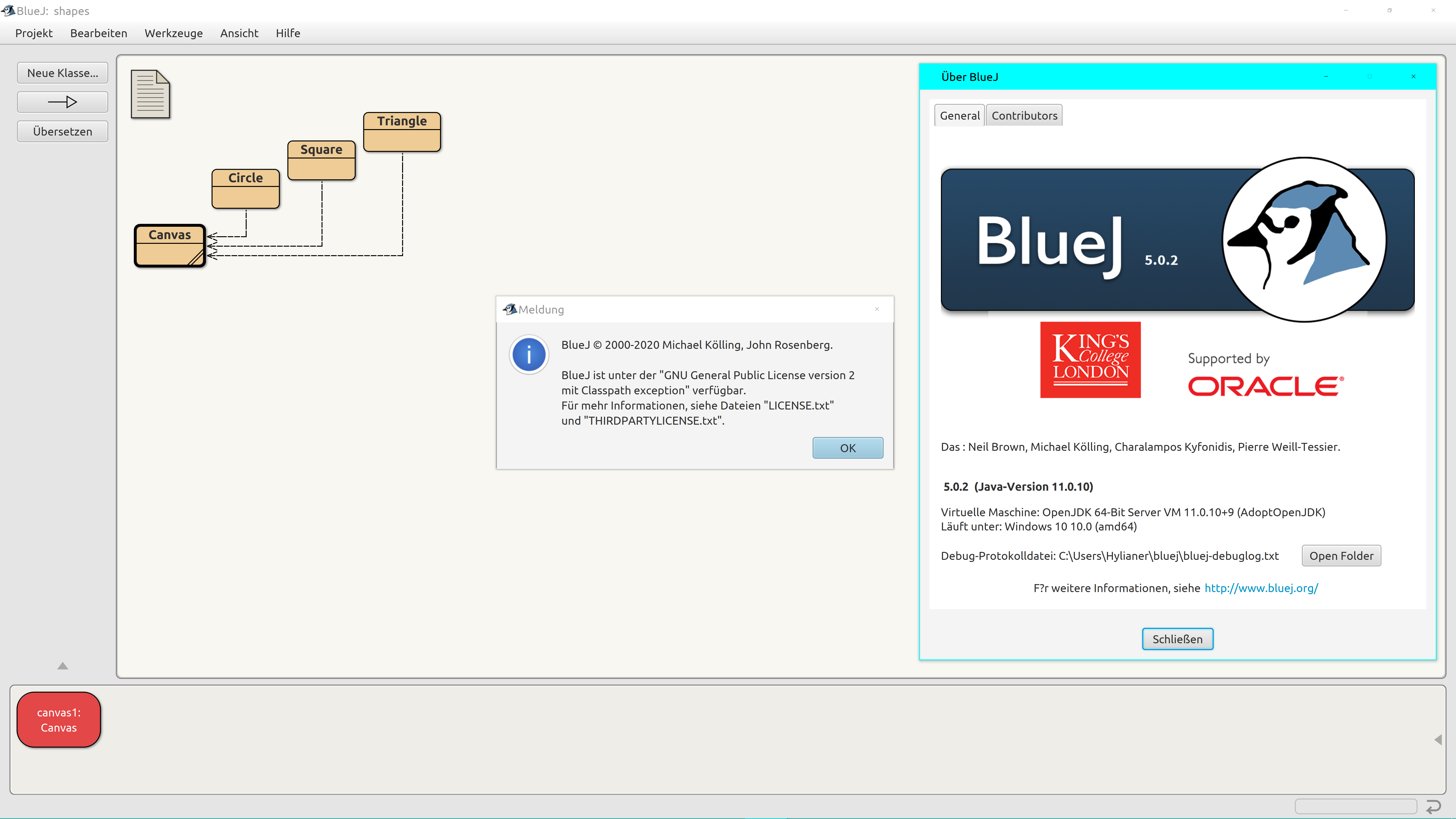
Blue J IDE

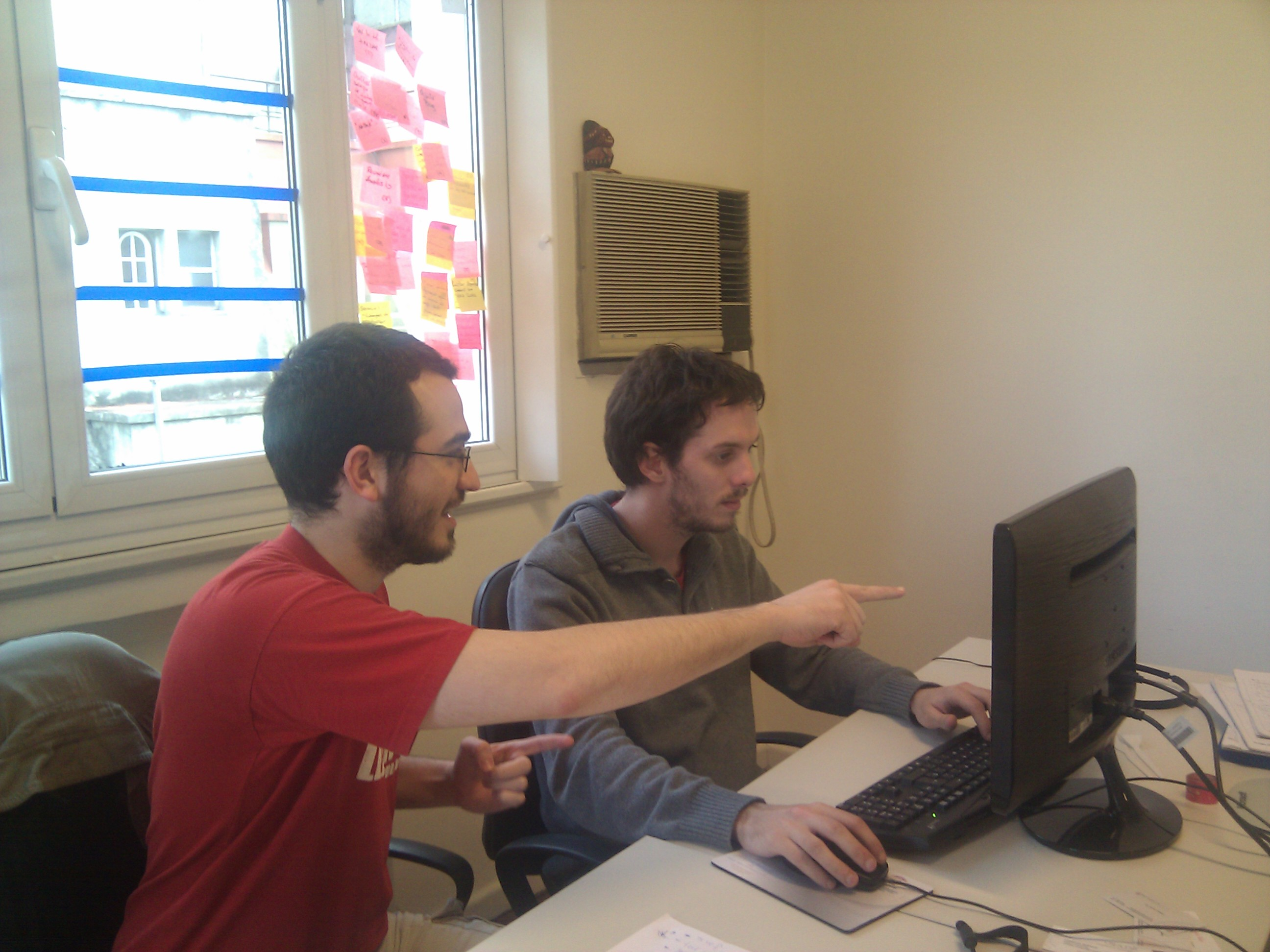
Pair Programming; a programming technique instrumental to Blue J's development

Michael Kölling is a German-British computer scientist, currently working at King's College London, best known for the development of the BlueJ and Greenfoot educational development environments and as author of introductory programming textbooks. In 2013 he received the SIGCSE Award for Outstanding Contribution to Computer Science Education for the development of the BlueJ.

== Education and early life ==
Kölling was born in Bremen, Germany. He earned a degree in informatics from the University of Bremen. In 1999, he was awarded a Ph.D. in computer science from the University of Sydney, for research on the design of an object-oriented programming environment and language supervised by John Rosenberg.

== Career and research ==
From 1995 to 1997 he worked at the Sydney University, followed by a position as a senior lecturer at Monash University and, from 2001, a post as an associate professor at the University of Southern Denmark. He worked at the School of Computing at the University of Kent, UK, until February 2017. He is now a professor of computer science at King's College London, where he also occupies the role of vice-dean for education.

Kölling is the lead designer of 'Blue', an object-oriented programming language and integrated environment, BlueJ, and Greenfoot. All are educational development environments aimed at teaching and learning programming. BlueJ and Greenfoot are widely used in many schools and universities.

Kölling co-wrote Objects First with Java with David J. Barnes, and wrote Introduction to Programming with Greenfoot.

At the Association for Computing Machinery (ACM) Special Interest Group (SIG) of Computer science education (SIGCSE) 2010 conference, held in Milwaukee, Wisconsin, his work was referenced as one of the most influential tools in the history of computer science education. This paper described Kölling's work on the Blue programming language, which preceded BlueJ.

=== Microsoft patent issue ===
On 22 May 2005 Kölling entered the BlueJ website in response to a post on Dan Fernandez's blog (Lead Product Manager – Visual Studio Express). Fernandez described a new feature of Visual Studio 2005 that "helps you understand objects at Design Time, rather than runtime." This feature had striking similarities to how the object test bench functions within BlueJ.

Kölling did not act on the discovery. However, on May 11, 2006 Microsoft attempted to patent the idea. As the object test bench is essential to the way it functions, had Microsoft's patent been granted, it was likely that BlueJ would have had to have been discontinued.

Kölling spoke to Microsoft, namely Jane Prey, and eventually the patent was dropped.

Fernandez posted a response on his blog saying "the patent application was a mistake and one that should not have happened. To fix this, Microsoft will be removing the patent application in question. Our sincere apologies to Michael Kölling and the BlueJ community."

=== Awards and honours ===
His awards and honours include:

- SIGCSE Test of Time Award 2020.
- Elected a Fellow of the British Computer Society (FBCS).
- SIGCSE Award for Outstanding Contribution to Computer Science Education 2013.
- ACM Distinguished Member in 2011.
- National Teaching Fellowship 2008. Higher Education Academy, UK.
- Duke's Choice Award 2007 (industry award), category “Java Technology in Education”, 2007.
- Australasian Distinguished Dissertation Award, 2000. The Computing Research and Education Association of Australasia.
- Victorian Pearcey Award (for his development of BlueJ), 1999.
- BCS Lovelace Medal, 2025.
