= Tim Bell (computer scientist) =

New Zealand computer scientist

Tim Bell CNZM
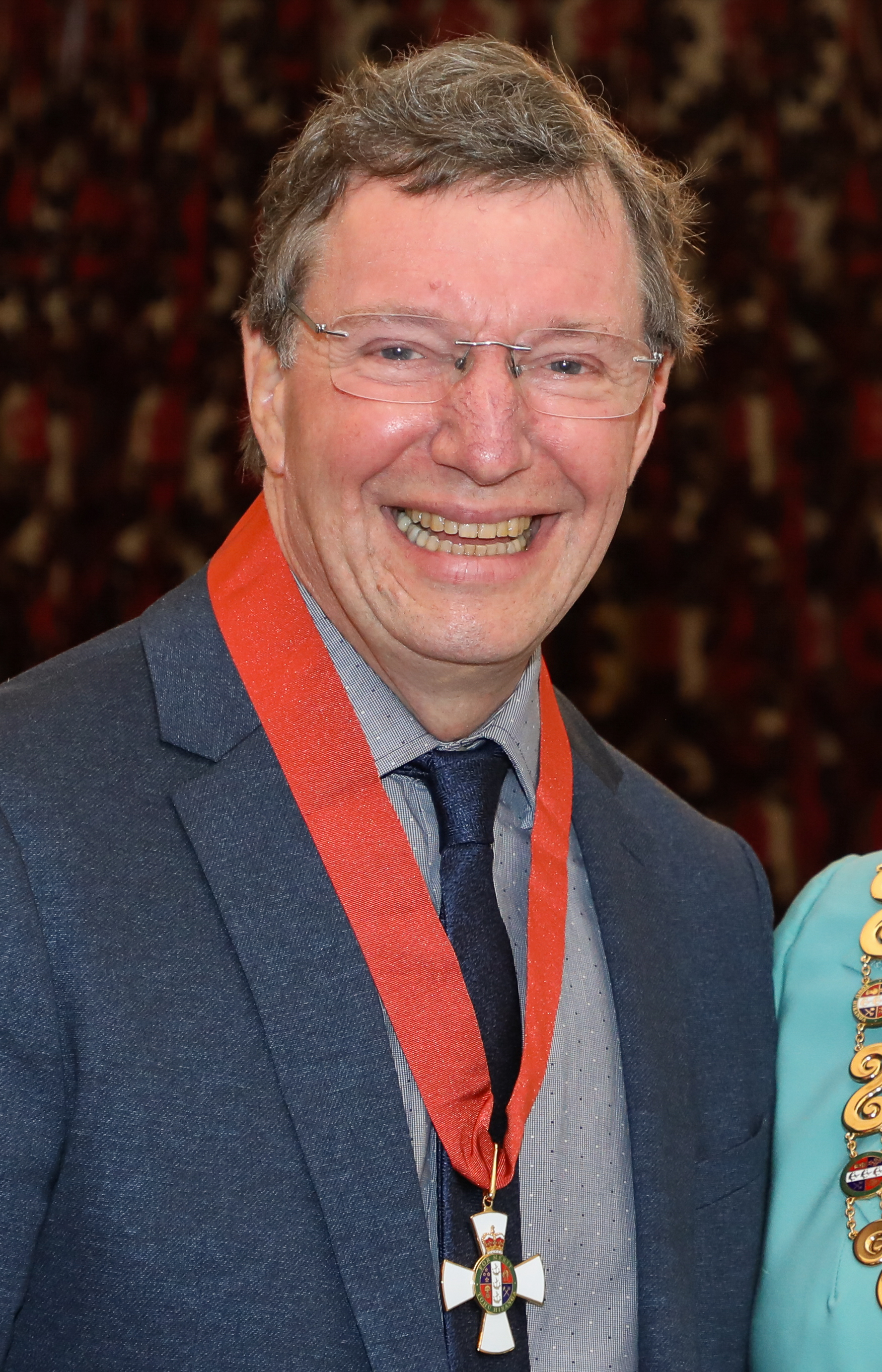
- Bell in 2024
- Born: Timothy Clinton Bell
- Education: Nelson College; University of Canterbury
- Awards: Outstanding Contribution to Computer Science Education (2018)
- Scientific career
- Fields: Computer science education, computer music and text compression
- Thesis: A unifying theory and improvements for existing approaches to text compression (1986)
- Doctoral advisor: John Penny
- Website: profiles.canterbury.ac.nz/Tim-Bell

Timothy Clinton Bell CNZM is a New Zealand computer scientist, with interests in computer science education, computer music and text compression.

== Education ==
Bell was educated at Nelson College from 1975 to 1979, and was dux in his final year. He completed his PhD at the University of Canterbury, with a thesis titled A unifying theory and improvements for existing approaches to text compression.

== Career and research ==
Bell joined the staff and rose to professor and head of department. In parallel with his academic work he has developed Computer Science Unplugged, a system of activities for teaching computer science without computers. The system was actively promoted by Google in 2007.

== Awards and honors ==
In 2017, it was announced by SIGCSE that Bell would receive the 2018 Outstanding Contribution to Computer Science Education. In 2018, he was also elected an ACM Distinguished Member.

In the 2024 New Year Honours, Bell was appointed a Companion of the New Zealand Order of Merit, for services to computer science education.

== Selected works ==
- Witten, Ian H., Alistair Moffat, Timothy C. Bell, Managing gigabytes: compressing and indexing documents and images. Morgan Kaufmann, 1999.
- Bell, Timothy C., John G. Cleary, and Ian H. Witten. Text compression. Prentice-Hall, Inc., 1990.
- Witten, Ian H., and Timothy C. Bell. "The zero-frequency problem: Estimating the probabilities of novel events in adaptive text compression." IEEE transactions on information theory 37, no. 4 (1991): 1085–1094.
- Ian H. Witten, Alistair Moffat, and Timothy C. Bell. Managing gigabytes: compressing and indexing documents and images. Morgan Kaufmann, 1999.
- Bell, Timothy, Ian H. Witten, and John G. Cleary. "Modeling for text compression." ACM Computing Surveys 21, no. 4 (1989): 557–591.
