= Amber Settle =

American computer scientist

- Citizenship: United States
- Education: University of Arizona (BS, BA); University of Chicago (SM, PhD)
- Known for: Work in the field of computer science
- Scientific career
- Fields: Computer science education
- Workplaces: DePaul University

Amber Settle is an American computer scientist and professor of education and theory in the department of Computer Science at DePaul University in Chicago, Illinois. She is known for her work in computer science education and her continuing service and leadership in Association for Computing Machinery (ACM) Special Interest Group on Computer Science Education (SIGCSE). She is also known for her work on computational thinking.

== Education ==
She received a bachelor of science in mathematics and a bachelor of arts in German from the University of Arizona. She also received a master of science and a doctor of philosophy in theoretical computer science from the University of Chicago.

== Career ==
She served on the SIGCSE Board for six years, during which she served as Treasurer for three. SIGCSE is the premier international organization for computer science educators serving over 2700 members from more than 60 countries.

She is served as Past Chair on the ACM SIGCSE Board from 2016-2019.

== Awards and honors ==
In 2011, she was awarded the ACM Women Senior Member Award for her leadership, technical, and professional accomplishments.

In 2015, she received the DePaul School of Computing Spirit of Inquiry Award for her work on Computational Thinking across the Curriculum.

In 2019, she was elected an ACM Distinguished Member.

== Selected publications ==
- 2002. Settle, Amber, and Janos Simon. Smaller solutions for the firing squad. Theoretical Computer Science 276.1-2 (2002): 83-109.
- 2014. Linda Mannila, Valentina Dagiene, Barbara Demo, Natasa Grgurina, Claudio Mirolo, Lennart Rolandsson, Amber Settle, Computational thinking in K-9 education, Proceedings of the working group reports of the 2014 on innovation & technology in computer science education conference, Pages 1–29, ACM, 2014.
- 2016. Undergraduate Students' Perceptions of the Impact of Pre-College Computing Activities on Choices of Major, ACM Transactions on Computing Education, 2016.

== See also ==
- SIGCSE Technical Symposium on Computer Science Education
