= Sally Fincher =

Computer scientist

Sally Fincher FRSA
- Born: Sally A. Fincher; 1959 (age 66–67)
- Education: University of Kent (BSc); Georgetown University (MA)
- Awards: Suffrage Science award (2018); Outstanding Contribution to Computer Science Education (2010); National Teaching Fellowship (2005)
- Scientific career
- Fields: Pattern languages Computing education research
- Workplaces: University of Kent
- Website: www.kent.ac.uk/computing/people/3153/fincher-sally

Sally A. Fincher (born 1959) is a British computer scientist and Emerita Professor of Computing Education at the University of Kent. She was awarded the Suffrage Science award in 2018 the SIGCSE Award for Outstanding Contribution to Computer Science Education in 2010 and a National Teaching Fellowship in 2005.

== Early life and education ==
Fincher was an undergraduate student at the University of Kent, where she studied philosophy and computer science. She moved to the United States for her graduate studies, where she was awarded a Master of Arts degree in English from Georgetown University.

== Research and career ==
Fincher leads the University of Kent Computing Education Group. Here she has led computing education projects, including the bootstrapping research in Computer Science Education series and the UK sharing practice project. These programmes looked to identify best practise for computer science education and disseminate this information to the teaching community.

Beyond innovations in computing education, Fincher studies patterns and the development of patterns for human–computer interaction. She created a pattern library for user interfaces for human–computer interactions.

=== Awards and honours ===
Fincher was honoured by Ann Blandford for ‘making computer science education inclusive and effective’. She served as chair of the Council of Professors and Heads of Computing (CPHC) from 2018 to 2020. Other awards include:

- 2003: Mary Kenneth Keller Computer Science & Engineering Undergraduate Teaching Award
- 2004: Honorary Doctorate from Antenor Orrego Private University
- 2005: National Teaching Fellowship by the Higher Education Academy (HEA)
- 2009: ACM Distinguished Member
- 2010: Outstanding Contribution to Computer Science Education from the Association for Computing Machinery (ACM) Special Interest Group (SIG) on Computer Science Education (SIGCSE)
- 2018: Suffrage Science award

=== Selected publications ===
Her publications include:

- Computer Science Education Research with Marian Petre
- The Cambridge Handbook of Computing Education Research with Anthony V. Robins
- Programming Environments for Novices
- Computer science project work : principles and pragmatics
