= Liz Mossop =

British veterinarian and educator

Professor Liz Mossop FRCVS NTF

Vice-Chancellor of Sheffield Hallam University
- Incumbent
- Assumed office January 2024
- Preceded by: Chris Husbands

Personal details
- Born: Elizabeth Helen Mossop; 1976 (age 49–50)
- Education: Royal (Dick) School of Veterinary Studies, University of Edinburgh (BVM&S, 2000); University of Nottingham (MMedSci 2007; PhD, 2012)
- Occupation: University Vice Chancellor; Professor; Veterinarian
- Known for: Veterinary education; Curriculum development; Student engagement
- Salary: £260,000 (2023–24)
- Awards: National Teaching Fellowship (2016); Lord Dearing Award (2007, 2012); Fellow of the Royal College of Veterinary Surgeons (FRCVS, 2018)

Elizabeth Helen Mossop FRCVS (born in October 1976) is a British veterinarian, academic, and university leader. Since January 2024, she has served as Vice‑Chancellor of Sheffield Hallam University.

== Education ==
Mossop earned her veterinary degree (BVM&S) from the Royal (Dick) School of Veterinary Studies at the University of Edinburgh in 2000. She later completed postgraduate degrees at the University of Nottingham: an MMedSci in Clinical Education (2007) and a PhD in Veterinary Education (2012), with a doctoral thesis titled Defining and teaching veterinary professionalism.

== Academic career ==
Mossop joined the University of Nottingham School of Veterinary Medicine and Science in 2006 as a lecturer and was awarded the Lord Dearing Award in 2007 and 2012 for outstanding teaching. From 2009 to 2017, she also served as a trustee of WikiVet. Mossop became an associate professor and sub-dean for teaching, learning, and assessment in 2012. In 2016, she received a National Teaching Fellowship from Advance HE — the highest national award for teaching in UK higher education. Mossop later earned her professorship in 2017.

In 2018, she was admitted as a Fellow of the Royal College of Veterinary Surgeons (FRCVS). In the same year, she joined the University of Lincoln as Deputy Vice‑Chancellor for Student Development and Engagement, later becoming Provost and Senior Deputy Vice‑Chancellor.

=== Leadership at Sheffield Hallam University ===
In August 2023, Mossop was appointed Vice‑Chancellor of Sheffield Hallam University; she formally assumed the position in January 2024.
