= Kwan Queenie Li =

Hong Kong artist

- Born: Hong Kong
- Education: University of Oxford (BFA); Massachusetts Institute of Technology
- Known for: Photography
- Notable work: Weeds: A Germinating Theory (2025)
- Website: kwanq.cargo.site

Kwan Queenie Li is a Hong Kong artist and author.

== Biography ==
Li received a Bachelor of Fine Arts from the University of Oxford and a Bachelor of Business Administration from the Chinese University of Hong Kong. She became a teaching fellow at the Massachusetts Institute of Technology (MIT) in the university's Art, Culture, and Technology (ACT) program. Li is based in Hong Kong.

Kwan authored the 2025 book Weeds: A Germinating Theory, a photo essay that was published by Mack Books. Published in the book are more than 150 photos she took for more than 10 years of weeds in numerous cities, including Athens, Cairo, Jerusalem, Mexico City, Shanghai, and Varanasi. Gavin Van Horn of Places Journal called the book's photos "convincing, provoking, encouraging one to comb the cracks for tenacious green".
