= Barbara Boucher Owens =

American computer scientist

- Education: New York University; The University of Texas at Austin; Ohio Wesleyan University
- Known for: Computer science education
- Awards: SIGCSE Award for Lifetime Service to the Computer Science Education Community (2016)
- Scientific career
- Fields: Computer Science
- Workplaces: Southwestern University; St. Edward's University; Mercy College
- Website: people.southwestern.edu/~owensb/

Barbara Boucher Owens is an American computer scientist noted for her leadership in computer science education. She was the Chair of SIGCSE from 2007 to 2010 and an elected member of the SIGCSE Board for 16 years from 1997 to 2013.

== Education ==
Boucher Owens received a Bachelor of Arts degree in Psychology from Ohio Wesleyan University in 1965. She received a Master of Arts degree in Experimental Psychology from The University of Texas at Austin in 1967 and a Doctor of Philosophy in Computer Applications to Education from New York University in 1977.

== Career and research ==
Boucher Owens started her career at IBM in 1967 in the area of computer assisted instruction. She began her teaching career in 1970 at Brooklyn College as an instructor in Psychology and founded their Department of Computer Science in 1971, teaching there until 1977. She was an instructor of Computer Science at City University of New York (CUNY) in 1979. She has been a faculty member at Mercy College in Computer Science from 1982 to 1988. She became an associate professor at St. Edward's University in Computer Science in 1989 and was promoted to Professor of Computer Science in 1996. In 1999 she became an associate professor of Computer Science at Southwestern University, and retired as an emeritus Professor in 2012.

Boucher Owens is one of the co-founders of the Computing Educators Oral History Project.

== Awards and honors ==
- 2016: SIGCSE Award for Lifetime Service to the Computer Science Education Community
- 2012: ACM Distinguished Member
