= Frame-based editor =

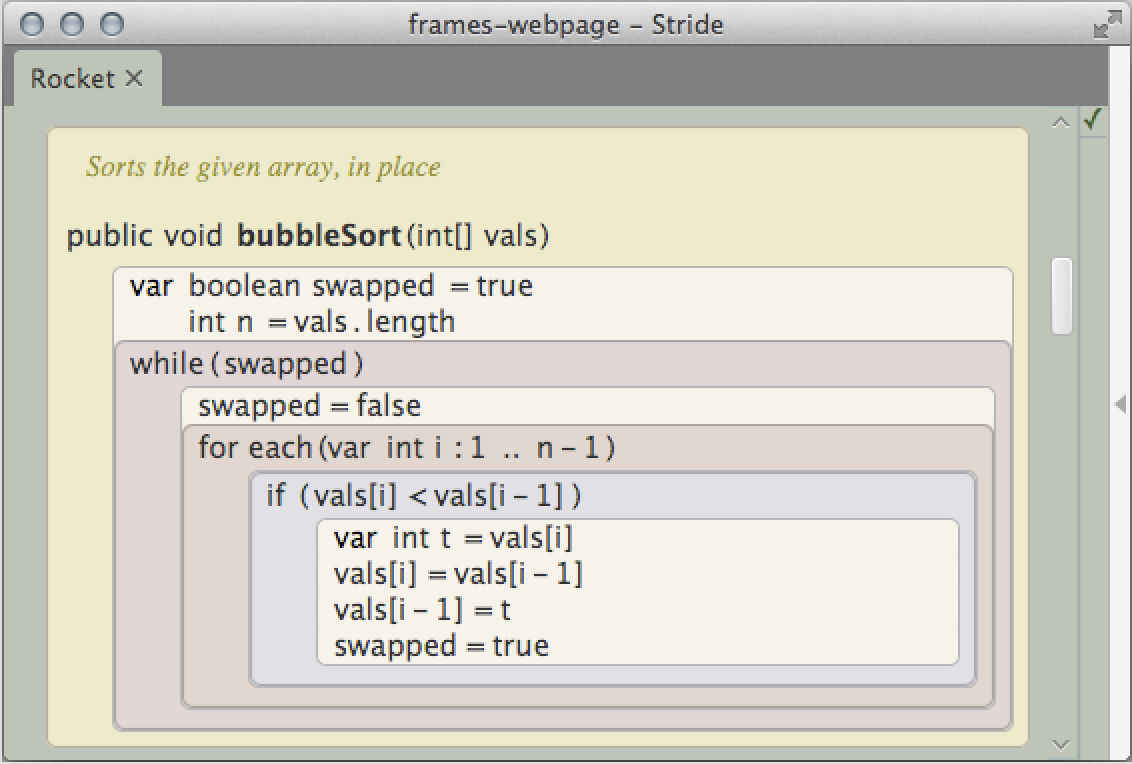

A frame-based editor is a specific kind of structure editor, typically used as a source code editor for the manipulation of computer programs. Program elements are represented by frames, which form the standard atomic unit of manipulation in the editor.

The advantage of frames for users is the avoidance of a good number of syntax errors: since statements are always entered in their entirety, errors involving missing or incorrect punctuation symbols are not possible; indentation errors are equally avoided.

This benefits particularly novice programmers, who can concentrate on program structure and semantics, without a need to recall full statement syntax.

== Technical background ==
Frames in the editor represent nodes in the underlying syntax tree of the language being written, such as simple statements, control structures, or methods, and are manipulated as single entities in the user interface.

The representation of frame-based programs on screen makes use of graphical and textual elements. Most fundamentally, scope is presented by graphical boxes (the "frames" that give these editors their name), but other graphical elements, including color and graphical presentation, are also employed. Manipulation of frames in frame-based editors is typically supported equally via mouse-based gestures and keyboard manipulation.

== Origin ==
The concept of Frame-based editing was developed at King's College London as a combination of features of standard text editors and block-based editing systems, such as Blockly and Scratch. The concept attempts to merge beneficial aspects of block and text programming in a single system.

== Relation to block-based editors and text editors ==
Frame-based editors are technically hybrid structure/text editors which support editing at the higher level of the syntax tree in structure mode, while allowing expression edits in text mode. They copy a number of concepts from block-based editors, such as the graphical representation of statements, which are manipulated as atomic units, presented graphically with distinct colouring, can be dragged-and-dropped with mouse gestures, and the provision of statement palettes from which statements may be chosen.

Other elements are modelled on traditional text editors, such as display of the program as linear text, keyboard-driven editing, and free-form editing at the expression level.

An academic study has compared effectiveness of frame-based editors to text editors for beginning programmers.

== Application ==
Currently, frame-based editors are used in educational systems to facilitate entry into programming for novice programmers, or to support the transition for learners from educational block-based systems, such as App Inventor, Scratch, Snap!, or Alice, to professional, text based programming environments.

Theoretically, these types of editors can be used for manipulation of any structured text, including computer programs, web pages, and XML files. The editor benefits especially non-professional users, such as novices or casual programmers, due to its support for discoverability of statements and reduction of syntax errors.

== Examples ==
There are several examples of frame-based editors. The earliest are in the BlueJ and Greenfoot educational development environments. Both support frame-based editing for the Stride programming language.

Later examples include the Strype system (a Python-based frame editor) and Elan, an educational programming language.
