= SIGCSE Technical Symposium on Computer Science Education =

The SIGCSE Technical Symposium on Computer Science Education is the main conference for computer science educators by Association for Computing Machinery's special interest group on Computer Science Education (SIGCSE). It has been held annually in February or March in the United States since 1970, with the exception of 2020 when it was cancelled due to COVID-19. In 2019, there were 1,809 attendees and 994 total submissions from over 50 countries, with a total of 2,668 unique authors representing over 800 institutions and organizations. There were 526 paper submissions (up 15% on 2018), with 169 papers accepted across the three paper tracks (CS Education Research, Experience Reports & Tools, and Curricula Initiatives) which was up 5% over 2018. It is a CORE A Conference.

SIGCSE members often refer to the Symposium as "SIGCSE" (pronounced SIG-see), as in "Are you going to SIGCSE this year?" or "I attended her talk at last year's SIGCSE". Thus, while "SIGCSE" refers to the ACM Special Interest Group (SIG) that is SIGCSE, it also refers to the SIGCSE Technical Symposium.

== Conferences ==
Susan Rodger maintains a page with the history of the SIGCSE Technical Symposium and other SIGCSE conferences.

- SIGCSE 2023 - Toronto, Quebec, Canada - March 16-18, 2023 - 54th conference
- SIGCSE 2022 - Providence, Rhode Island - March 2–5, 2022 - 53rd conference
- SIGCSE 2021 Toronto, Canada (virtual due to COVID-19 pandemic) - March 13–20, 2021
- SIGCSE 2020 Portland, Oregon - March 11–14, 2020 - 51st conference
- SIGCSE 2019 Minneapolis, Minnesota - February 27 - March 2, 2019 - 50th conference
- SIGCSE 2018 Baltimore, Maryland - February 21–24, 2018 - 49th conference
- SIGCSE 2017 Seattle, Washington - March 8–11, 2017 - 48th conference
- SIGCSE 2016 Memphis, Tennessee - March 2–5, 2016 - 47th conference
- SIGCSE 2015 Kansas City, Missouri - March 4–7, 2015 - 46th conference
- SIGCSE 2014 Atlanta, Georgia - March 5–8, 2014 - 45th conference
- SIGCSE 2013 - Denver, Colorado - 44th conference
- SIGCSE 2012 - Raleigh, NC - 43rd conference
- SIGCSE 2011 - Dallas, Texas - 42nd conference
- SIGCSE 2010 - Milwaukee, Wisconsin - 41st conference
- SIGCSE 2009 - Chattanooga, Tennessee - 40th conference
- SIGCSE 2008 - Portland, Oregon - 39th conference
- SIGCSE 2007 - Covington, Kentucky - 38th conference
- SIGCSE 2006 - Houston, Texas - 37th conference

== Nifty Assignments ==
The Nifty Assignments session is one of the most popular sessions at the conference. Started by Nick Parlante in 1999, the session serves as a place for educators to share ideas and materials for successful computer science assignments. Nifty assignments are shared publicly for general reference and usage.

Presenters have included Owen Astrachan, Allison Obourne, Richard E. Pattis, Suzanne Matthews, Joseph Zachary, Eric S. Roberts, Cay Horstmann, Michelle Craig, Mehran Sahami, David Malan, and Mark Guzdial.
