= Lara Alcock =

British mathematics educator

- Education: University of Warwick (BSc, MSc, PhD)
- Awards: National Teaching Fellowship (2015)
- Scientific career
- Fields: Mathematical thinking Proof comprehension Mathematical reading
- Institutions: Loughborough University; Rutgers University; Essex University
- Thesis: Categories, definitions and mathematics : student reasoning about objects in analysis (2001)
- Doctoral advisor: Adrian Simpson
- Website: laraalcock.com

Lara Alcock is a British mathematics educator. She is a professor in mathematics education at Loughborough University, head of the Mathematics Education Centre at Loughborough, and the author of several books on mathematics. Alcock won the Selden Prize for her research in mathematics education and the inaugural John Blake University Teaching Medal in 2021. Alcock is a National Teaching Fellow.

== Education ==
Alcock earned bachelor's and master's degrees in mathematics at the University of Warwick, and in 2001 completed a PhD in mathematics education at Warwick. Her PhD research on Categories, definitions and mathematics: Student reasoning about objects in analysis, was supervised by Adrian Simpson.

== Career and research ==
After working as an assistant professor at Rutgers University in New Jersey, she returned to the UK as a teaching fellow at Essex University. She moved to Loughborough in 2007.

=== Publications ===
Alcock's publications include:

- Ideas from Mathematics Education: An Introduction for Mathematicians (with Adrian Simpson, Higher Education Academy, 2009)
- How to Study for a Mathematics Degree / How to Study as a Mathematics Major (UK/US; Oxford University Press, 2013); Wie man erfolgreich Mathematik studiert (translated into German by Bernhard Gerl, Springer Spektrum, 2017)
- How to Think about Analysis (Oxford University Press, 2014)
- Mathematics Rebooted: A Fresh Approach to Understanding (Oxford University Press, 2017)
- How to Think About Abstract Algebra (Oxford University Press, 2021)

=== Awards and honours ===
Alcock is the 2012 winner of the Annie and John Selden Prize for research in undergraduate mathematics education, given by the Mathematical Association of America. She was named a National Teaching Fellow by the Higher Education Academy in 2015.

Alcock was the inaugural winner of the Institute of Mathematics and its Applications John Blake University Teaching Medal in 2021.
