= Letizia Jaccheri =

Italian and Norwegian software engineer

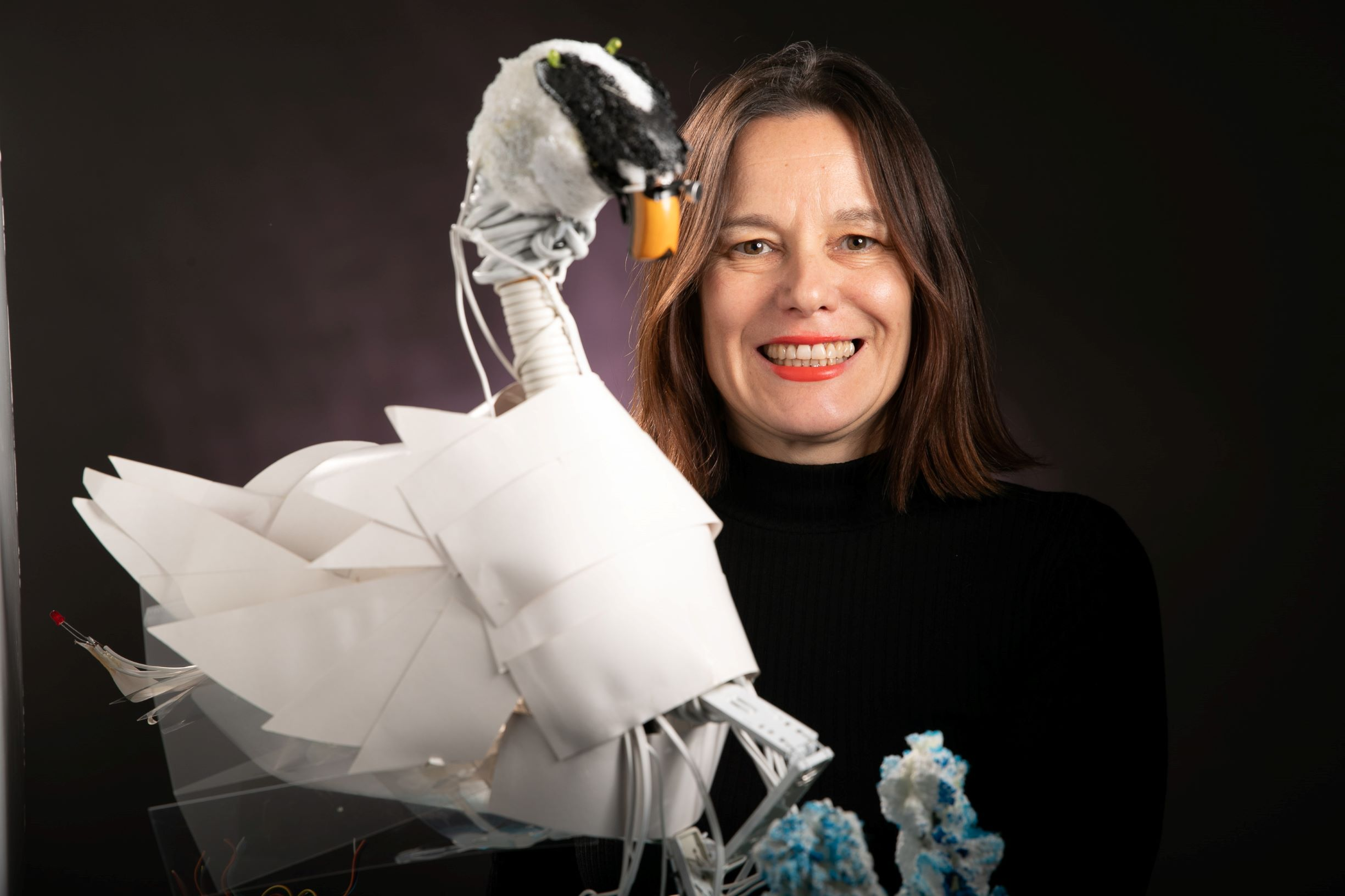
Jaccheri with a robot built in a 2018 NTNU program for high school students

Maria Letizia Jaccheri (born 1965) is a Norwegian software engineer and computer science educator. Her research focuses on the societal impacts of computing in areas including gender equity, the environment, and health, and on empirical research in computer science education. She is a professor in the Department of Computer Science at the Norwegian University of Science and Technology (NTNU). Originally Italian, she is a citizen of Norway.

== Education and career ==
Jaccheri earned a laurea, the Italian equivalent of a master's degree, in computer science in 1988 at the University of Pisa. She completed a Ph.D. in software engineering in 1994 at the Polytechnic University of Turin.

After postdoctoral research at the Polytechnic University of Turin, she moved to Norway and NTNU in 1997, as an associate professor of computer science. She has been a full professor there since 2002, and headed the department from 2013 until 2017. She has also held adjunct positions at the University of Oslo and University of Tromsø.

== Recognition ==
Jaccheri is a member of the Norwegian Academy of Technological Sciences (NTVA). She was named as a knight in the Order of the Star of Italy in 2022. She has been a distinguished speaker of the Association for Computing Machinery since 2018.
