= John Rosenberg (academic) =

Australian higher education consultant

John Rosenberg OAM
- Born: 1953 (age 72–73)
- Education: Monash University (PhD)
- Spouse: Beverley Rosenberg
- Children: Mark and Rebecca
- Scientific career
- Fields: Computer science
- Workplaces: La Trobe University
- Thesis: The Concept of a Hardware Kernel and its Implementation on a Minicomputer (1979)
- Doctoral students: Michael Kölling

John Rosenberg (born 1953) is an Australian higher education consultant, professional board director, Australian academic, information technology (IT) professional and the former senior deputy vice-chancellor and vice-president (global relations) at La Trobe University in Victoria, Australia.

== Education ==
Rosenberg completed his Bachelor of Science with Honours at Monash University in 1975, and earned his Doctor of Philosophy in computer science in 1979, also at Monash. His PhD thesis was entitled The Concept of a Hardware Kernel and its Implementation on a Minicomputer.

== Career and research ==
Upon receiving his PhD in 1979, Rosenberg worked as a lecturer in computer science and then as a senior consultant in the IT industry. He became a senior lecturer in the Department of Computer Science at Monash University before moving to the University of Newcastle, New South Wales, in 1986.

In 1989 he was awarded the position of S.E.R.C. Senior Visiting Research Fellow with the University of St Andrews in Scotland, after which he became an associate professor and head of the Discipline of Computer Science at University of Newcastle in 1990. In 1991 he moved to the University of Sydney as professor of computer science and became head of its Basser Department of Computer Science three years later in 1994. He returned to Melbourne in 1997 to take up the position of dean of the Faculty of Information Technology, once again at Monash University.

He moved to Deakin University as deputy vice-chancellor (academic) in 2003, before coming to La Trobe University in 2009. He commenced as deputy vice-chancellor and vice-president (international and development) at La Trobe in 2009 and in 2011 became senior deputy vice-chancellor, responsible for the university's internationalisation agenda. Rosenberg retired from his formal role at La Trobe University and was appointed an Emeritus Professor of La Trobe University in recognition of his contributions to the university and higher education. He now undertakes consulting in higher education and holds a number of roles as a non-executive director.

Rosenberg's research interests include integrated Java developments for teaching. Since 1995, his research in this area has involved developing and maintaining the integrated development environments BlueJ and Greenfoot. He also has a strong interest in the use of technology in education.

=== Honours ===
Rosenberg is a fellow of the Australian Academy of Technological Sciences and Engineering, the Australian Institute of Company Directors and the Australian Computer Society, and an Emeritus Professor of La Trobe University.

He was awarded the Medal of the Order of Australia in the 2025 King's Birthday Honours.

=== Publications ===
- Kölling, M., Quig, B., Patterson, A. and Rosenberg, J. "The BlueJ System and its Pedagogy", Journal of Computer Science Education, Special issue on Learning and Teaching Object Technology, 13(4), December 2003, pp. 249–268.
- Rosenberg, J., Dearle, A., Hulse, D., Lindström, A. and Norris, S. "Operating System Support for Persistent and Recoverable Computations", Communications of the ACM, 39, 9, September 1996, pp. 62–69.
- Dearle, A., di Bona, R., Farrow, J. M., Henskens, F. A., Lindström, A., Rosenberg, J. ' and Vaughan, F. "Grasshopper: An Orthogonally Persistent Operating System", Computer Systems, 1994, pp 54–72.
- Rosenberg, J., Keedy, J.L. and Abramson, D.A. "Addressing Mechanisms for Large Virtual Memories", The Computer Journal., 35, 4, August, 1992, pp 369–375.
- Rosenberg, J., Ananda, A.L. and Srinivasan, B. "A Self-assessment Procedure for Operating Systems", Communications of the ACM, 33, 2,.February, 1990, pp. 190–201.
- Kölling, M. and Rosenberg, J. "Guidelines for Teaching Object Orientation with Java", Proceedings of the 6th Conference on Innovation and Technology in Computer Science Education (ITiCSE 2001), ACM Press, Canterbury, 2001, pp. 33–36.
- Rosenberg, J. and Kölling, M. "Testing Object-Oriented Programs: Making It Simple", in Proceedings of SIGCSE'97, ACM Press, San Jose, February, 1997, pp. 77–81.
- Kölling, M. and Rosenberg, J. "An Object-Oriented Program Development Environment for the First Programming Course", Proceedings of SIGCSE'96, ACM Press, Philadelphia, 1996, pp. 83–87.
- Kölling, M. and Rosenberg, J. "Blue - A Language for Teaching Object-Oriented Programming", Proceedings of SIGCSE'96, ACM Press, Philadelphia, 1996, pp. 190–194.

== Personal life ==
Rosenberg founded Melbourne's first Masorti (Conservative) Jewish congregation, Kehilat Nitzan, in 1999. In 2011, the Australian Jewish News listed Professor Rosenberg in the top 50 most influential Australian Jews.
