= SIGCSE Award for Lifetime Service to the Computer Science Education Community =

SIGCSE Lifetime Service to Computer Science Education
- Awarded for: lifetime service to computer science education
- Presented by: SIGCSE
- Website: sigcse.org/sigcse/programs/awards/lifetime

The SIGCSE Lifetime Service to Computer Science Education is an awarded granted by the Association for Computing Machinery (ACM) Special Interest Group (SIG) SIGCSE annually since 1997, for lifetime contributions to computer science education.

== Laureates ==
Laureates have included:

- Chris Stephenson, 2024
- Renée McCauley, 2023
- Simon, 2022
- Cary Laxer, 2021
- Alison Clear, 2020
- Gloria Townsend, 2019
- Eric S. Roberts, 2018
- Mats Daniels, 2017
- Barbara Boucher Owens, 2016
- Frank Young, 2015
- Andrea Lawrence, 2014
- Henry Walker, 2013
- Jane Prey, 2012
- Gordon Davies, 2011
- Peter J. Denning, 2010
- Michael Clancy, 2009
- Dennis J. Frailey, 2008
- John Impagliazzo, 2007
- Joyce Currie Little, 2006
- Andrew McGettrick, 2005
- Bruce Klein, 2004
- Harriet G. Taylor, 2003
- A. Joe Turner, 2002
- Lillian N. Cassel, 2001
- James Miller, 2000
- Bob Aiken, 1999
- Della Bonnette, 1998
- Dick Austing, 1997
