= Eric S. Roberts =

American computer scientist

Eric Roberts
- Born: Eric S. Roberts; Durham, North Carolina, US
- Education: Harvard University (BA, MS, PhD)
- Known for: computer science education
- Awards: ACM Fellow (2007); SIGCSE Award for Lifetime Service to the Computer Science Education Community (2018)
- Scientific career
- Fields: Computer Science
- Workplaces: Stanford University; Wellesley College; Reed College; Willamette University
- Website: cs.stanford.edu/people/eroberts/

Eric S. Roberts is an American computer scientist noted for his contributions to computer science education through textbook authorship and his leadership in computing curriculum development. He is a co-chair of the ACM Education Council, former co-chair of the ACM Education Board, and a former member of the SIGCSE Board. He led the Java task force in 1994. He was a Professor emeritus at Stanford University. He currently teaches at Willamette University in Salem, Oregon.

== Education ==
Roberts received an A. B. in applied mathematics from Harvard University in 1973. He received an S. M. in applied mathematics from Harvard University in June 1974 and a Ph.D in applied mathematics from Harvard University in 1980.

== Career and research ==
He joined the Department of Computer Science at Wellesley College as an assistant professor in 1980. In 1984–1985 he was a visiting lecturer in Computer Science at Harvard University. In 1990 he was an associate professor at Stanford University and promoted to professor (teaching) of Computer Science in 1990. In 2018, he joined Reed College as a visiting professor of computer science. In 2020, he joined Willamette University as the Mark and Melody Teppola Presidential Distinguished Visiting Professor.

While at Stanford he has also held several other positions such as associate chair and director of undergraduate studies from 1997 to 2002, and senior associate dean for student affairs from 2001 to 2003.

Roberts has written several introductory computer science textbooks, including

- Thinking Recursively
- The Art and Science of C
- Programming Abstractions in C
- Thinking Recursively with Java
- The Art and Science of Java

=== Awards ===
Roberts has several notable awards in computer science.

- SIGCSE Award for Lifetime Service to Computer Science Education
- ACM Karl V. Karlstrom Outstanding Educator Award in 2012.
- IEEE Computer Society's 2012 Taylor L. Booth Education Award.
- Elected ACM Fellow in 2007.
