= Joseph Zachary =

American computer scientist

Joseph L. Zachary
- Education: Massachusetts Institute of Technology
- Scientific career
- Fields: Computer science
- Workplaces: University of Utah (1987-present)
- Thesis: A Framework for Incorporating Abstraction Mechanisms into the Logic Programming Paradigm (1987)
- Doctoral advisor: John Guttag

Joseph "Joe" Lawrence Zachary is an American computer scientist and professor at the University of Utah. He is known for his work in computer science education as a charter member of the United States Department of Energy Undergraduate Computational Engineering and Science (UCES) Project, an education initiative to improve the undergraduate science and engineering curriculum through computation. He was influential in promoting a new approach to teaching scientific programming to beginning science and engineering students.

== Education and career ==
Joseph Zachary received his PhD in 1987, his SM in 1983, and his SB in 1979, all in computer science from the Massachusetts Institute of Technology. He started teaching at the University of Utah School of Computing in 1987. In 1999 he received the IEEE Computer Science and Engineering Undergraduate Teaching Award for "outstanding and sustained contributions to undergraduate computational science education, including writing innovative textbooks, developing innovative online educational materials, and teaching an exemplary introductory scientific programming course". As part of his work as a charter member of the United States Department of Energy Undergraduate Computational Engineering and Science (UCES) Project, he wrote two introductory scientific programming textbooks, the first in 1996 and the second in 1998, and developed an extensive suite of interactive courseware to accompany them. UCES later developed into the Computational Science Graduate Fellowship administered by the Krell Institute. One of his assignments has appeared in the Nifty Assignments session at the SIGCSE annual meeting.

== Bibliography ==
Zachary, Joseph L. (1996). Introduction to Scientific Programming: Computational Problem Solving Using Maple and C. Springer-Verlag. ISBN 0-387-94630-6.

Zachary, Joseph L. (1998). Introduction to Scientific Programming: Computational Problem Solving Using Mathematica and C. Springer-Verlag. ISBN 0-387-98250-7.
