= Cheng-Chih Wu =

Taiwanese computer scientist

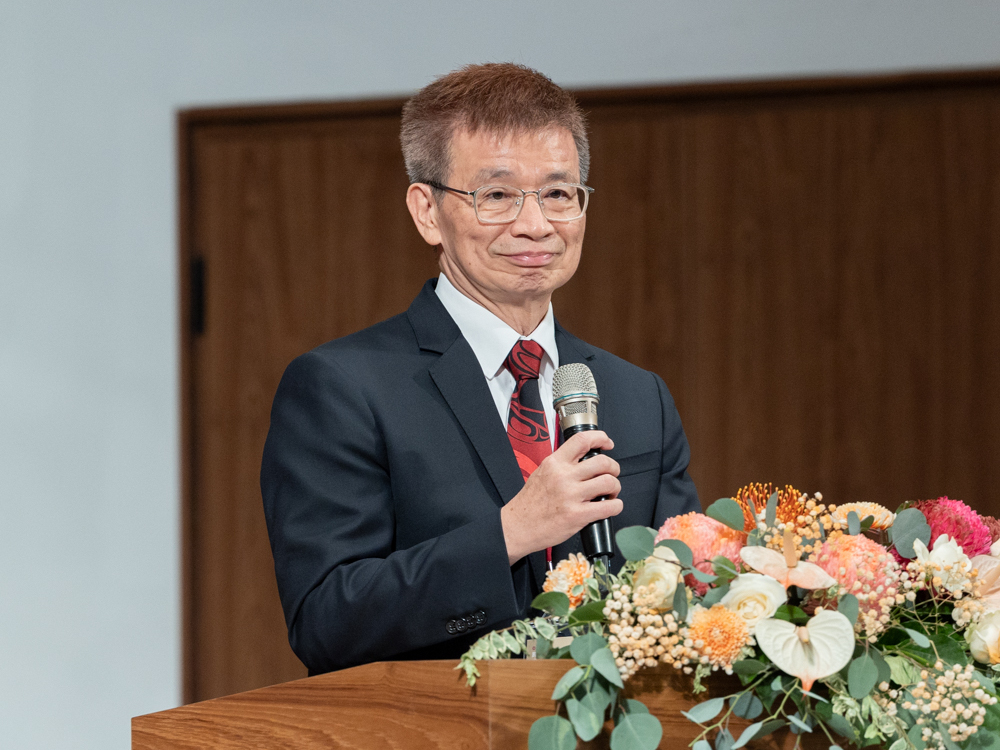
- Wu in 2023

President of National Taiwan Normal University
- Incumbent
- Assumed office February 22, 2018
- Preceded by: Kuo-En Chang

Personal details
- Born: 1957 (age 68–69)
- Education: National Taiwan Normal University (BEd, MEd); University of Texas at Austin (PhD)

Cheng-Chih Wu (Chinese: 吳正己; born 1957) is a Taiwanese computer scientist and education professor who is the president of National Taiwan Normal University, where he was the director of its Graduate Institute of Information and Computer Education.

Wu's expertise includes designing computer courses and teaching materials, teaching with information technology, and mobile learning.

== Education ==
Wu graduated from National Taiwan Normal University with a Bachelor of Education (B.Ed.) and a Master of Education (M.Ed.), both in industrial education. He then completed doctoral studies in the United States, earning his Ph.D. in science education with a specialization in computer science from the University of Texas at Austin in 1993. His doctoral dissertation, supervised by computer scientist Nell B. Dale, was titled, "Conceptual models and individual cognitive learning styles in teaching recursion to novices".

== Academic career ==
After receiving his doctorate, Wu joined the faculty at National Taiwan Normal University, where he was the chairman of the department of information and computer education from 1999 to 2001. He then was a visiting scholar of education at the University of Cambridge in England from 2005 to 2006, and directed the NTNU Information Technology Center from 2008 to 2010. From 2010 to 2013, he was the dean of academic affairs at the university, and served as the vice-president of the university from 2013 to 2017. He became the president of National Taiwan Normal University on February 22, 2018.

During his deanship at NTNU, he has put through many reforms, including abolishing the rule of expelling students who fail more than half of the registered courses. Wu once said, “students should be responsible for their own education, while we should give them a second chance instead of depriving them of their right to education with this rule.”

== Sports ==
- President of National Taiwan Normal University Football Team
