= Gary England (veterinarian) =

Professor Gary England FRCVS
- Born: Gary Charles William England
- Occupations: Veterinary surgeon; Academic
- Known for: Veterinary reproduction; Canine fertility research; Veterinary education
- Office: Foundation Dean of the University of Nottingham School of Veterinary Medicine and Science
- Awards: Fellow of the Royal College of Veterinary Surgeons (FRCVS)

Academic background
- Education: BVetMed, RVC (1986); PhD, RVC (1990); DVetMed, RVC (1997)

Gary England FRCVS is a British veterinary surgeon and academic specialising in animal reproduction and fertility. He serves as Foundation Dean of the University of Nottingham School of Veterinary Medicine and Science.

== Education ==
England obtained his Bachelor of Veterinary Medicine (BVetMed) from the Royal Veterinary College in 1986 where he later completed a PhD in 1990. In 1993, he was awarded the Diploma of Fellowship of the Royal College of Veterinary Surgeons and a Diploma in Veterinary Radiology from the same institution. In 1995, he became a Diplomate of the American College of Theriogenology and obtained a Diploma in Veterinary Reproduction from the Royal College of Veterinary Surgeons. He was awarded the DVetMed by the University of London in 1997.

== Academic career ==
England has worked extensively in veterinary academia, with a focus on reproductive biology, fertility management, and assisted reproductive technologies in companion animals and livestock species. He has contributed to the development of veterinary education and research programmes in the United Kingdom, particularly in the field of veterinary reproduction.

He played a leading role in the establishment of the School of Veterinary Medicine and Science at the University of Nottingham and became its Foundation Dean upon its creation in 2007.

== Research ==
England's research focuses on veterinary reproduction, including canine and equine fertility, semen preservation, artificial insemination, and in vitro fertilisation techniques. His work has contributed to advances in reproductive management in veterinary clinical practice.

As of 2026, his published academic work has received 16,241 citations.

== Leadership ==
England has served as Foundation Dean of the University of Nottingham School of Veterinary Medicine and Science since 2007, overseeing its development, academic strategy, and clinical partnerships within veterinary education.
