= Nell B. Dale =

American computer scientist

- Education: University of Houston; University of Texas at Austin
- Known for: computer science education textbooks
- Awards: ACM Fellow (2009); ACM Karl V. Karlstrom Outstanding Educator Award (2001)
- Scientific career
- Fields: Computer science
- Workplaces: University of Texas at Austin
- Doctoral students: Cheng-Chih Wu
- Website: www.cs.utexas.edu/users/ndale/

Nell B. Dale is an American computer scientist noted for her work in computer science education and computer science introductory programming textbooks. She was on the Association for Computing Machinery's Special Interest Group on Computer Science Education Board from 1981 to 1985, and from 1987 to 1993, and was Chair of SIGCSE from 1991 to 1993. She was chair of the SIGCSE Symposium in 1991 and co-chair of the SIGCSE Symposium in 2000.

== Biography ==
Dale received a B.S. in Mathematics and Psychology from the University of Houston in 1960. She received a M.A. in Mathematics from University of Texas at Austin in 1964 and a Ph.D in Computer Science from University of Texas in Austin in 1972.

She joined the Department of Computer Science at the University of Texas at Austin as an instructor in 1975, then a lecturer in 1977, a Senior Lecturer in 1981, and retired in 2000.

Dale wrote 16 textbooks on Pascal, C++, Visual Basic, Java and Ada.

== Bibliography ==
- (with John Lewis) Computer Science Illuminated (5th Edition 2012). Jones and Bartlett. ISBN 978-1449672843

== Awards ==
In the year 2009 she was named an ACM Fellow.

Her other notable awards include:

- ACM Karl V. Karlstrom Educator Award (2001)
- IEEE Computer Society Taylor L. Booth Award (2013)
- SIGCSE Award for Outstanding Contribution to Computer Science Education (1996)
