= Gloria Townsend =

American computer scientist

- Born: Gloria Childress Townsend
- Education: Indiana University Bloomington
- Known for: Work in the field of evolutionary computation
- Awards: SIGCSE Award for Lifetime Service to Computer Science Education (2019)
- Scientific career
- Fields: Evolutionary computation
- Workplaces: DePauw University

Gloria Townsend is an American computer scientist and professor in the department of Computer Science at DePauw University in Indiana. She is recognized for her work in evolutionary computation and her dedication to promoting women in computing. she is one of only four educators recognized for educational contributions to computing. She has served on the executive committee of the Association for Computing Machinery (ACM) Council on Women in Computing. She is the author of One Hundred One Ideas for Small Regional Celebrations of Women in Computing. In 2013, she received the Mr. and Mrs. Fred C. Tucker Jr. Distinguished Career Award for her notable contributions to DePauw, including her commitments to students, teaching excellence, her chosen discipline, and service to the university.

In 2006, she organized several new regional celebrations of Women in Computing (WiC) to coincide with the international Grace Hopper Celebration of Women in Computing conference. In 2010, the United States National Science Foundation awarded funding to expand the celebrations to cover 12 regions as a joint effort by ACM-W, ABI, and NCWIT., Gloria was recognized as a distinguished member of the ACM in 2020.

== Publications ==
- 1998. Turning liabilities into assets in a general education course, SIGCSE '98 Proceedings of the twenty-ninth SIGCSE technical symposium on Computer science education, Pages 58–62, ACM New York, New York, United States, 1998.
- 2002. People who make a difference: mentors and role models, ACM SIGCSE Bulletin - Women and Computing Homepage archive, Volume 34 Issue 2, Pages 57–61, ACM New York, New York, United States, June 2002.
- 2007. Leveling the CS1 playing field, SIGCSE '07 Proceedings of the 38th SIGCSE technical symposium on Computer science education, Pages 331–335, ACM New York, New York, United States, 2007.

== See also ==
- Association for Computing Machinery's Council on Women in Computing (ACM-W)
