= Joyce Currie Little =

American computer scientist (1934–2023)

Joyce Currie Little (January 20, 1934 – October 1, 2023) was an American computer scientist, engineer, and educator. She was a professor and chairperson in the Department of Computer and Information Sciences at Towson University in Towson, Maryland.

== Background and education ==
Little received a B.S. in Mathematics Education from the Northeast Louisiana University in 1957, an M.S. in applied mathematics from the San Diego State University in 1963, and a PhD in educational administration for computing services from the University of Maryland, College Park, in 1984.

== Career and achievements ==
While in graduate school in San Diego, California, Joyce Currie Little worked in the aerospace industry as a computational test engineer. From 1957 to 1960, she developed programs to analyze data from models being tested in a wind tunnel for Convair Aircraft Corporation in San Diego.

After completing her M.S., Little moved to Maryland and accepted a position at Goucher College teaching statistics and managing a computer centre. She also began work on her Ph.D. at the University of Maryland, College Park. In 1967, she became the chairperson of the Computer and Information Systems Department at the Community College of Baltimore. She moved to Towson University in Towson, Maryland, in 1981, where she was named Chairperson of the Department of Computer & Information Sciences in 1984. She had been an active member of the Association for Computing Machinery (ACM) for many years and received their Distinguished Service Award in 1992.

Her service to the broad computing community spans some 20 years and includes significant contributions to curriculum development, certification standards, vocational education and professional ethics.

— ACM Awards Highlight Computer Science Conference (1993)

Little received the SIGCSE Award for Lifetime Service to the Computer Science Education Community for her contributions to computing in two-year colleges, certification, and professional development.

== Research interests ==
Dr. Little's research interests included metrics and quality assurance in software engineering and social impact and cyber-ethics for workforce education. She has also been a strong advocate for the role of women in computing. Her later activities included a project on the evaluation of computer ethics courses in the Computer Science major at Towson University, and a project on the social impact of certification on the industry.

== Memberships ==
- Fellow, Association for Computing Machinery
- Association for Information Technology Professionals
- Fellow, American Association for the Advancement of Science
- Institute of Electrical and Electronics Engineers
- International Society for Technology in Education
- Maryland Association for Educational Uses of Computers, Inc.

== Death ==
Little died on October 1, 2023, at the age of 89.
