= Richard Wilding =

British academic and business professional (born 1965)

Professor Richard Wilding OBE
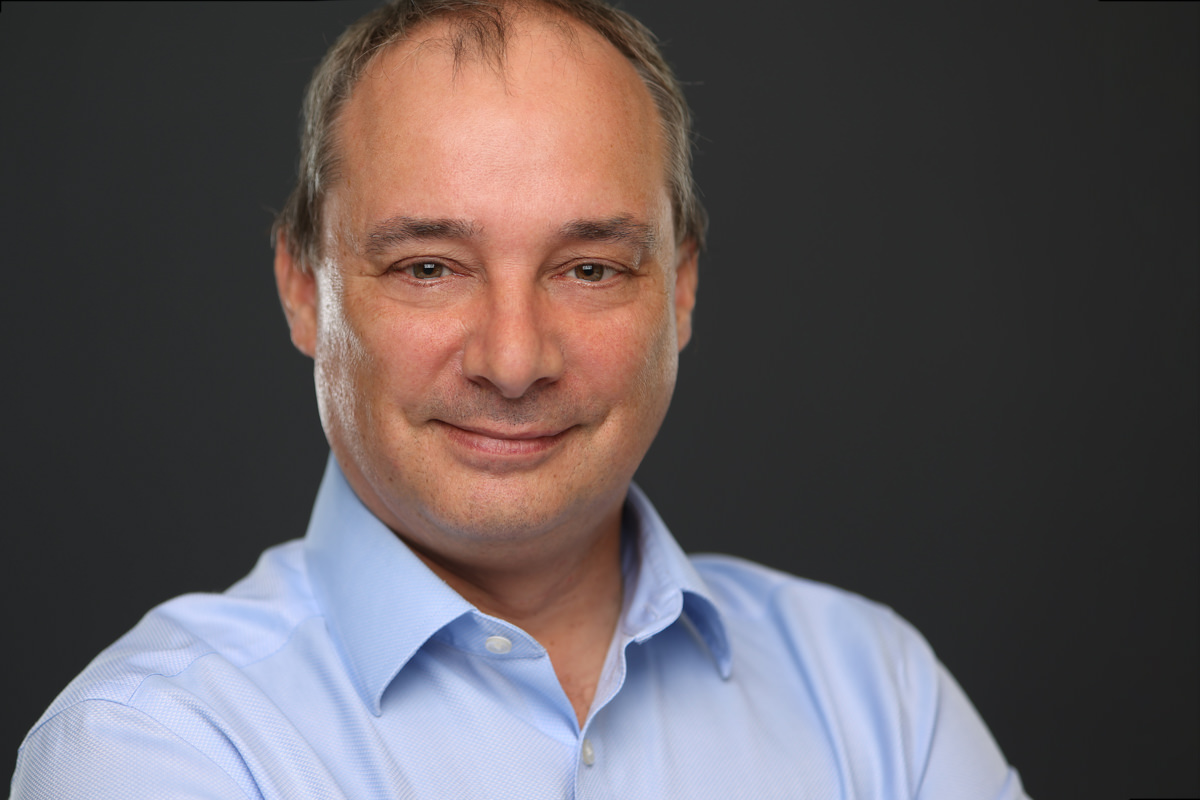
- Richard David Wilding
- Born: 8 May 1965 (age 61); Sheffield, Yorkshire
- Occupations: Academic and business professional
- Known for: Logistics and supply chain management
- Board member of: Former Chairman of the Chartered Institute of Logistics and Transport

Academic background
- Education: University of Sheffield, University of Warwick
- Thesis: An investigation into sources of uncertainity within industrial supply chains : amplification, deterministic chaos & parallel interactions

Academic work
- Institutions: Cranfield University

Richard Wilding OBE (born 8 May 1965) is a British academic and business professional specialising in logistics, transport and supply chain management. He is recognised as one of the world's leading experts in logistics and supply chain management.

He is a Former Chairman of the Chartered Institute of Logistics and Transport U.K.,

== Early life ==
Wilding was born in Sheffield, Yorkshire, England and is the son of Christine and Malcolm Wilding. He was educated at Princethorpe College, Warwickshire. His father, a physicist, worked at the University of Sheffield. It is reported he struggled at school from an eye tracking problem that was not diagnosed until into his teens, resulting in him struggling with school examinations.

== Education ==
Wilding studied Material Science and Technology at the University of Sheffield, graduating in 1987. He completed his Doctorate, 'Uncertainty generation in supply chains', part-time while in employment at the University of Warwick, graduating in 1998.

== Career ==
After graduating he spent a number of years working in industry before entering academia, joining the Warwick Manufacturing Group in 1991. In 1998 he moved to Cranfield University and was promoted to Professor and Chair of Supply Chain Risk Management in 2006. He is recognised as one of the "Fathers" of this subject discipline This role evolved and he is currently Emeritus Professor of Supply Chain Strategy. In this position he has taken on various other posts including Director, Trustee and Chairman of the Chartered Institute of Logistics and Transport between 2011 and 2019 and Director and Trustee of the Chartered Institute of Procurement and Supply in 2020. He was appointed a National Teaching Fellow in 2019 specializing in andragogy within a business context .

Since the mid-2000s, Wilding has contributed to research on blood supply chain management, including work on perishable inventory management, platelet supply chains and hospital blood logistics. This work contributed to Cranfield University's REF 2021 impact case study Saving Lives: Improving Efficiency and Reducing Wastage in the Blood Supply Chain, which reported improvements in blood inventory management and reduced wastage in collaboration with NHS Blood and Transplant. Wilding's earlier research was subsequently cited in NHS Blood and Transplant’s BSMS Inventory Management Best Practice Review (2024), where it formed part of the evidence base for guidance on blood inventory management practice.

In 2022, Wilding wrote the foreword to the United Kingdom Ministry of Defence's Defence Supply Chain Strategy, which addressed supply chain resilience in defence procurement and reflected themes developed in his earlier research on supply chain risk and resilience. In October 2022, he gave oral evidence as an expert witness to the House of Commons International Trade Committee during its inquiry The UK's international supply chains.

He has worked with BBC News in writing and discussing supply chain management, and in particular home delivery issues He has worked with Channel 4 on a Dispatches programme “Where’s My Missing Mail?” and published in the Financial Times. He warned of the impending supply chain disruptions of COVID-19 and his advice and insights into the impacts of the coronavirus pandemic were heavily cited by the world media (for example) He took part in a notable television debate on U.K. national television “Good Morning Britain” advising on the unintended consequences of the Consumer stockpiling on the supply chain.

== Awards, honours and recognition ==
Wilding has received many awards for his work and impact on global business. He was appointed Officer of the Most Excellent Order of the British Empire (OBE) in the Queen's 2013 New Year Honours for service to business. In 2017 he was awarded the "Lifetime contribution to training and development in Logistics" at the Logistics Talent Awards. He was awarded The Viscount Nuffield Silver Medal for Achievement in Design and Production in 2013 He was Winner of the European Supply Chain Excellence Awards Individual contribution award in 2010 and the European Supply Chain Distinction Award “Distinguished Service Award for Thought Leadership and Service to Supply Chain Management”.

Wilding has been listed in the SHD Magazine Logistics 100 since 2015, He was awarded the "Logistics 100 Award" in 2017. thus identifying him as the top U.K. logistics professional of 2017. In the refocused 2019 list he was recognized as one of the Top 5 outside influencers of the logistics profession from academia, trade associations and future skills networks Professor Wilding was recognized as the No.1 outside influencer from U.K. academia.

Wilding has been listed in the "2018 Top 100 Corporate Modern Slavery Influencers Index” recognising individuals from all business sectors, media and academia who are influence leaders in raising awareness to end modern slavery and labour exploitation.

In January 2019 he was published in a list of the Top 50 influencers in e-commerce and shipping.

He was awarded U.K. National Teaching Fellowship in 2019.

The Chartered Institute of Logistics and Transport U.K. awarded him the Institutes "Meritorious Service Award." and in 2022 he was awarded “The Sir Robert Lawrence Award 2021.”

In February 2026, Wilding was recognised by the International Supply Chain Education Alliance (ISCEA) as one of its Top 10 Supply Chain Influencers.

In March 2018, Reading Buses named a low-carbon bio-gas double deck bus after "Richard Wilding OBE" in recognition of his work across the logistics world and the close ties Reading Buses has with the Chartered Institute of Logistics and Transport.

In 2025, a curry dish named the “Prof Richard Curry” was introduced at Titash Restaurant in Rugby U.K. his home town.

== Personal life ==
Richard lives near Rugby, Warwickshire. He is Vice Patron of Bedfordshire Opportunities for Learning Disabilities (previously Beds Garden Carers), a day care and education centre for individuals with learning disabilities and challenging behaviours. He has acted as judge for the annual Women in Logistics Awards.
