= JFLAP =

Educational software

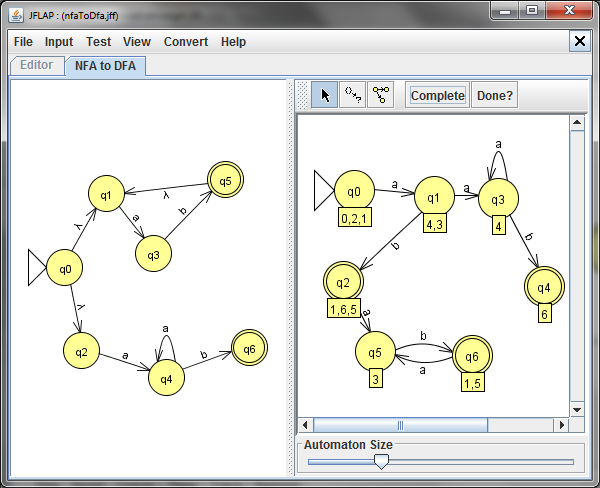
- JFLAP NFA to DFA proof
- Developers: Susan H. Rodger, Duke University
- Stable release: 7.1 / 2018
- Platform: Java SE
- Available in: English
- Type: Educational software
- Website: www.jflap.org
- Repository: www2.cs.duke.edu/csed/jflap/jflaptmp/july27-18/JFLAP7.1.jar

JFLAP (Java Formal Languages and Automata Package) is interactive educational software written in Java for experimenting with topics in the computer science area of formal languages and automata theory, primarily intended for use at the undergraduate level or as an advanced topic for high school. JFLAP allows one to create and simulate structures, such as programming a finite-state machine, and experiment with proofs, such as converting a nondeterministic finite automaton (NFA) to a deterministic finite automaton (DFA).

JFLAP is developed and maintained at Duke University, with support from the National Science Foundation since 1993. It is freeware and the source code of the most recent version is available, but under some restrictions. JFLAP runs as a Java application.

== History ==
Before JFLAP, there were several software tools related to automata theory developed by Susan H. Rodger and her students starting around 1990 in the Computer Science Department at Rensselaer Polytechnic Institute. In 1992, the first published paper at a DIMACS 2012 workshop described a related tool called NPDA (the paper was published later in 1994 in a DIMACS series). NPDA then evolved into FLAP, including also finite-state machines and Turing machines. In 1993, a paper on Formal Languages and Automata Package (FLAP) was published . At that time, the tool was written in C++ and X Window. Around 1994, Rodger moved to Duke University and continued tool development. Around 1996, FLAP was converted to Java and the first paper mentioning JFLAP was published in 1996. Along the way, other tools were developed as standalone tools and then later integrated into JFLAP. For example, a paper in 1999 described how JFLAP now allowed one to experiment with construction type proofs, such as converting an NFA to a DFA to a minimal state DFA, and as another example, converting NPDA to CFG and vice versa. In 2002 JFLAP was converted to Swing. In 2005-2007 a study was run with fourteen institutions using JFLAP. A paper on this study in 2009 showed that students using JFLAP thought JFLAP made them feel more engaged in the class, and made learning the concepts easier.

The history of JFLAP is covered on the jflap.org site, and includes over 35 students from Rensselaer Polytechnic Institute and Duke University who have worked on JFLAP and related tools since 1990.

A paper by Chakraborty, Saxena and Katti entitled "Fifty years of automata simulation: a review" in ACM Inroads magazine in December 2011 stated the following about JFLAP: "The effort put into developing this tool is unparalleled in the field of simulation of automata. As a result, today it is the most sophisticated tool for simulating automata. It now covers a large number of topics on automata and related fields. The tool is also the best documented among the tools for simulation of automata." and "The tool uses state of the art graphics and is one of the easiest to use. The tool is undoubtedly the most widely used tool for simulation of automata developed to date. Thousands of students have used it at numerous universities in more than a hundred countries."

== Topics covered in JFLAP ==
Topics on regular language include:

- finite-state machine
- regular grammar
- regular expression
- Proof on nondeterministic finite automaton to deterministic finite automaton
- Proof on deterministic finite automaton to regular grammar
- Proof on deterministic finite automaton to regular expression
- pumping lemma for regular languages

Topics on context-free language include:

- pushdown automata
- context-free grammar
- proof on wikt:nondeterministic pushdown automaton to context-free grammar
- proof on context-free grammar to pushdown automaton
- pumping lemma for context-free language
- CYK parser
- LL parser
- SLR parser

Topics on recursively enumerable language:

- Turing machine
- unrestricted grammar

Other related topics:

- Moore machine
- Mealy machine
- L-system

== Releases ==
JFLAP is currently released as Version 7.1.

== Awards ==
In 2007, Rodger and her students were a Finalist in the NEEDS Premier Award for Excellence in Engineering Education Courseware for the software JFLAP.

In 2014, Rodger was awarded the ACM Karl V. Karlstrom Outstanding Educator Award for her contributions to CS education, including the development of JFLAP.

== Books on JFLAP ==
Rodger and Thomas Finley wrote a book on JFLAP in 2006 that can be used as a supplemental book with an automata theory course. Gopalakrishnan wrote a book on Computation Engineering and in his book he encourages the use of JFLAP for experimenting with machines. JFLAP is also suggested to use for exercises. Mordechai Ben-Ari wrote a book entitled Principles of the SPIN model checker and JFLAP is referenced in the book. In particular the Visualizing Nondeterminism (VN) software the book is about reads finite automata in JFLAP file format. Maxim Mozgovoy wrote an automata theory textbook in which he uses screen shots from JFLAP Other people have written books that refer to the use of JFLAP in some way; several are mentioned on the JFLAP web site.
