= National Taiwan Normal University Football Team =

Collegiate soccer team in Taiwan

NTNU FC
- Full name: National Taiwan Normal University Football Team
- Founded: 2002
- Ground: National Taiwan Normal University Playground
- President: (Taiwan) Cheng-Chih Wu
- Manager: (Taiwan) Martin Garix
- League: Taiwan University League- Third Division
- Website: en.ntnu.edu.tw/athletic-department.php
Home colours	Away colours

The National Taiwan Normal University Football Team (NTNU FC) is a university football team participating in the Taiwan University League's Third Division. Founded in 2002 by Lai Wu-Xian and He Jun-Yi, the team only participates at the university level.

== Honors ==
Bloom Cup: Runner-up in 2012, 2013, 2014. UFA-Third Division: 2007: 8th; 2011: 6th

=== UFA record ===
Years	Final Result
(Taiwan) 2004	None
(Taiwan) 2005	Group Stage
(Taiwan) 2006	Round of 16
(Taiwan) 2007	8TH
(Taiwan) 2008	Group Stage
(Taiwan) 2009	Group Stage
(Taiwan) 2010	Group Stage
(Taiwan) 2011	6TH
(Taiwan) 2012	Group Stage
(Taiwan) 2013	Group Stage
(Taiwan) 2014	To Be Determined

=== UFA-Futsal record ===
Years	Final Result
(Taiwan) 2004	8th
(Taiwan) 2005	Did not enter
(Taiwan) 2006	Did not enter
(Taiwan) 2007	Did not enter
(Taiwan) 2008	Did not enter
(Taiwan) 2009	Did not enter
(Taiwan) 2010	Did not enter
(Taiwan) 2011	Did not enter
(Taiwan) 2012	Did not enter
(Taiwan) 2013	To Be Determined

== Squad ==
=== Current squad ===
Note: Flags indicate national team as defined under FIFA eligibility rules; some limited exceptions apply. Players may hold more than one non-FIFA nationality.

No.	Pos.	Nation	Player
1	GK	PAR	Alex wu
2	DF	MAC	Chi Chio Chan(3rd captain
3	GK	USA	Luke Deming
4	DF	IDN	Lu, An-Li
5	MF	MAS	Week Yeh, Chu
6	FW	Korea	Young Sung Chu
7	FW	HKG	David Ng.
8	DF	HKG	Ming Ka
9	MF	VIE	Guan Ho, Li
10	MF	TAI	Shi, Bo-Lin(captain)
11	MF	TAI	Tan, Yi-Tzen(vice-captain)
12	DF	TAI	Liang, Jia-Yuan
13	MF	TAI	Chen Wei Chan

No.	Pos.	Nation	Player
16	FW	TAI	You, Zhe-Ming
17	DF	Korea	Sun We Bu
18	FW	TAI	Chi W.
20	GK	TAI	Chen, Yao-Chieh
24	MF	FRA	Yannis Li
26	FW	MAS	Tan Suee
29	MF	SWE	Johan Bergsten

== Successive presidents, captains and coaches ==
=== Successive team presidents ===
	Years	President	note
1st	2003–04	(Taiwan) Lai, Wu-Xian	
2nd	2004–05	(Taiwan) He, Jun-Yi	
3rd	2005–06	(Taiwan) Hsieh, San-Chin	
4th	2006–07	(Taiwan) Chuang, Ming-Chou	
5th	2007–08	(Taiwan) Wang, Yen-Ren	
6th	2008–09	(Taiwan) Zhuo, Yu-Lin	
7th	2009–10	(Taiwan) Wong, Wei-Cheng	
8th	2010–11	(Taiwan) Liao, Ke-Yu	
9th	2011–12	(South Korea) Sun We Bu	
10th	2012–13	(Taiwan) Chi W.	
11th	2013–14	(Taiwan) You, Zhe-Ming	
12th	2014–15	did not elect	

=== Successive team captains ===
	Years	Captain	Note
1st	2003–04	none	
2nd	2004–05	(Taiwan) Hsieh, San-Chin	
3rd	2005–06	(Taiwan) Hsieh, San-Chin	
4th	2006–07	(Taiwan) Hsieh, San-Chin	
5th	2007–08	(Taiwan) Cheng, Yuan-Yu	
6th	2008–09	(Taiwan) Chen, Chien-Yu	
7th	2009–10	(Taiwan) Ghuan, Heng-An	
8th	2010–11	(Taiwan) Wu, Xian-Zhi	
9th	2011–12	(Macau) Leong Tak Long	
10th	2012–13	(Korea) Sun We Bu (Hong Kong) David Ng.	102–02–20 The Captain changed to David Ng.
11th	2013–14	(Taiwan) Shi, Bo-Lin	
12th	2014–15	did not elect	

=== Successive team coaches ===
	Years	Coach
1st	2003–04	none
2nd	2004–05	none
3rd	2005–06	(Taiwan) Jiang, Wen-Sen
4th	2006–07	(Taiwan) Jiang, Wen-Sen
5th	2007–08	(Taiwan) Jiang, Wen-Sen
6th	2008–09	(Taiwan) Jiang, Wen-Sen
7th	2009–10	(Taiwan) Jiang, Wen-Sen
8th	2010–11	(Taiwan) Jiang, Wen-Sen
9th	2011–12	(Hong Kong) Leong Kwok Chang
10th	2012–13	(Hong Kong) Leong Kwok Chang
11th	2013–14	(Taiwan) Chen, Yen-Fu
