= BlueJ =

IDE for Java Programming Language

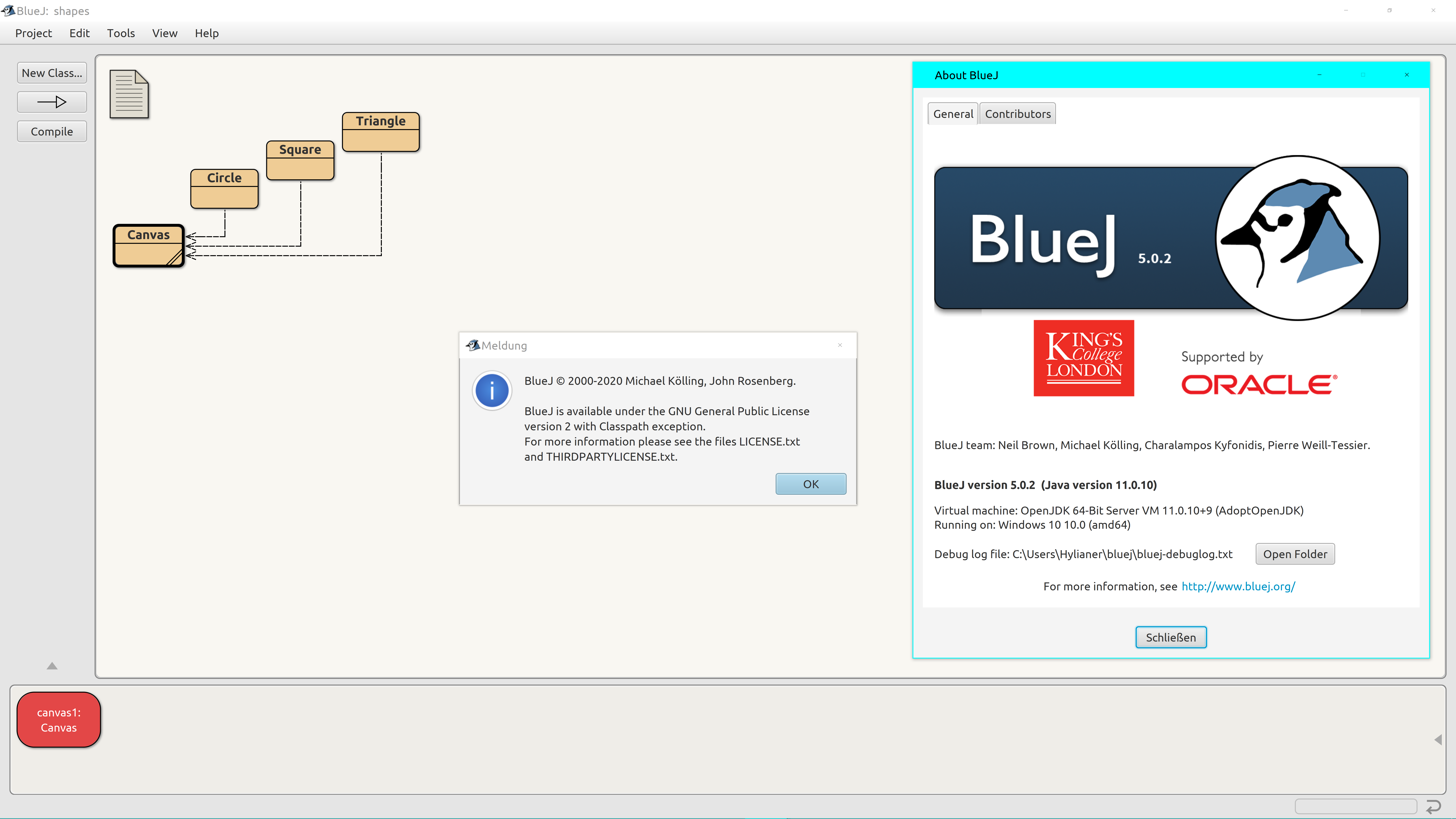
- Screenshot of BlueJ
- Original authors: Michael Kölling and John Rosenberg
- Developer: BlueJ Team
- Stable release: 6.0.0 / July 1, 2026; 4 months ago
- Written in: Java
- Operating system: Cross-platform
- Platform: Java
- Available in: Multilingual
- Type: Integrated development environment
- License: GPL-2.0-or-later with the Classpath exception
- Website: bluej.org

BlueJ is an integrated development environment (IDE) for the Java programming language, developed mainly for educational purposes, but also suitable for small-scale software development. It runs with the help of Java Development Kit (JDK).

BlueJ was developed to support the learning and teaching of object-oriented programming, and its design differs from other development environments as a result. The main screen graphically shows the class structure of an application under development (in a UML-like diagram), and objects can be interactively created and tested. This interaction facility, combined with a clean, simple user interface, allows easy experimentation with objects under development. Object-oriented concepts (classes, objects, communication through method calls) are represented visually and in its interaction design in the interface.

== History ==
The development of BlueJ was started in 1999 by Michael Kölling and John Rosenberg at Monash University, as a successor to the Blue system. Blue was an integrated system with its own programming language and environment, and was a relative of the Eiffel language. BlueJ implements the Blue environment design for the Java programming language.

In March 2009, the BlueJ project became free and open source software, and licensed under GPL-2.0-or-later with the Classpath exception.

BlueJ is currently being maintained by a team at King's College London, England, where Kölling works.

=== Supported language ===
BlueJ supports programming in Java and in Stride. Java support has been provided in BlueJ since its inception, while Stride support was added in 2017.

== See also ==
- Greenfoot
- DrJava
- Educational programming language

== Bibliography ==
- Barnes, David J.; Kölling, Michael (May 12, 2011). Objects First with Java: A Practical Introduction Using BlueJ (5th ed.). Prentice Hall. p. 560. ISBN 978-0-13-249266-9.
- Kölling, Michael; Quig, Bruce; Patterson, Andrew; Rosenberg, John (Aug 9, 2010). "The BlueJ System and its Pedagogy". Computer Science Education. 13 (4): 249–268. doi:10.1076/csed.13.4.249.17496. S2CID 2805887.
