= Susan H. Rodger =

American computer scientist

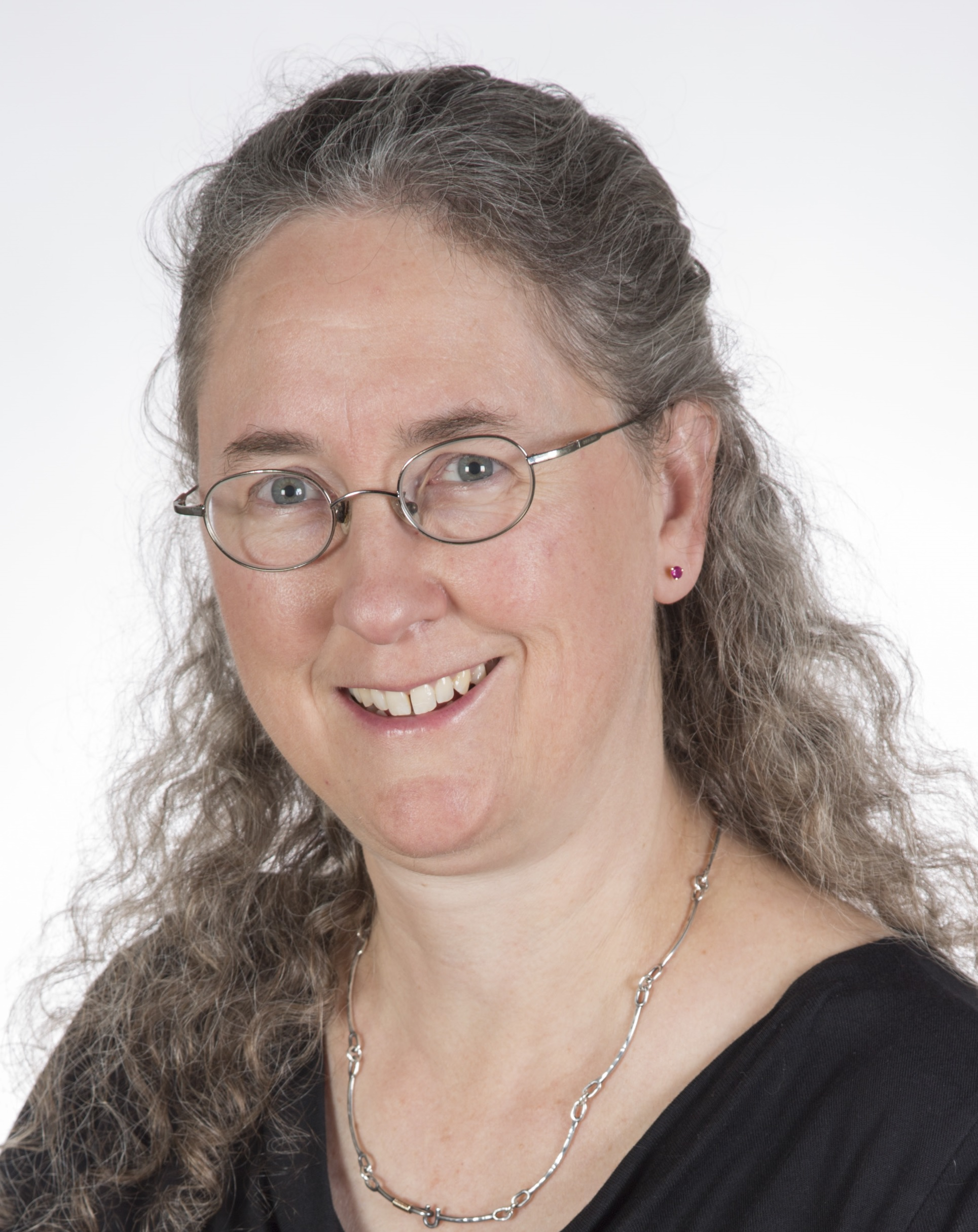
- Susan H. Rodger
- Born: Columbia, South Carolina, US
- Education: North Carolina State University; Purdue University
- Known for: Computer Science Education and the software JFLAP
- Awards: SIGCSE Award for Outstanding Contribution to Computer Science Education (2023); ACM Karl V. Karlstrom Outstanding Educator Award (2014); ACM Distinguished Educator (2006)
- Scientific career
- Fields: Computer Science
- Workplaces: Duke University
- Doctoral advisor: Greg N. Frederickson
- Website: www.cs.duke.edu/~rodger/

Susan H. Rodger is an American computer scientist known for work in computer science education including developing the software JFLAP for over twenty years. JFLAP is educational software for visualizing and interacting with formal languages and automata. Rodger is also known for peer-led team learning in computer science and integrating computing into middle schools and high schools with Alice. She is also served on the board of CRA-W and was chair of ACM SIGCSE from 2013 to 2016.

== Biography ==
Rodger was born in Columbia, South Carolina. She received a B.S. in computer science and a B.S. in mathematics from North Carolina State University in 1983. She received a M.S. in computer science from Purdue University in 1985 and a Ph.D. in computer science from Purdue University in 1989.

She immediately joined the Department of Computer Science at Rensselaer Polytechnic Institute as an assistant professor. In 1994 she moved to Duke University as an assistant professor of the Practice of Computer Science. She was promoted to associate professor of the practice of computer science in 1997 and to professor of the practice in 2008.

== Awards ==
2006: Rodger was named an ACM Distinguished Member.
2007: Finalist in the NEEDS Premier Award for Excellence in Engineering Education Courseware (for the software JFLAP).
2014: ACM Karl V. Karlstrom Outstanding Educator Award.
2019: IEEE Computer Society Taylor L. Booth Education Award.
2019: David and Janet Vaughan Brooks Award
2023: SIGCSE Award for Outstanding Contribution to Computer Science Education

== See also ==
- Owen Astrachan
- Alicia Nicki Washington
- Duke University
- JFLAP
- Purdue University
- Rensselaer Polytechnic Institute
- North Carolina State University
- Alice (software)
