= National Teaching Fellowship =

National Teaching Fellow
- Awarded for: individuals who have made an outstanding impact on student outcomes and the teaching profession in higher education
- Sponsored by: Advance HE
- Date: 2000
- Website: www.advance-he.ac.uk/awards/teaching-excellence-awards/national-teaching-fellowship

The National Teaching Fellowship Scheme (NTFS) is an award for excellence in teaching in higher education for teaching fellows in England, Scotland, Northern Ireland, and Wales. The scheme was first administered by the Higher Education Academy, which subsequently became Advance HE in 2018. The scheme was started in 2000 and there are now more than 900 national teaching fellows (NTFs) across the UK. In 2016 an additional team award, the Collaborative Award for Teaching Excellence (CATE) was launched. This award recognises teams for their collaborative work and excellent practice in teaching and learning.

Awards are made annually from a process that requires applicants to provide an evidenced and endorsed case of their approaches to teaching, and how their work has impacted on teaching and learning in higher education, within their institution and beyond. The application is assessed by three independent reviewers against set criteria.

Although the majority of NTF applicants are academic staff who teach, many work in professional services and management, for example library services or careers, and/or undertake pedagogical research. The NTFS scheme is managed and facilitated by Advance HE, formerly the Higher Education Academy. The Head of the Excellence Awards at Advance HE is currently Nicola Watchman Smith, previously Catriona Bell. The NTFS and CATE Awards are open to all UK-based higher education providers who hold Advance HE membership status, including colleges and private providers. The schemes take place on an annual basis, with winners announced in August of each year.

== Laureates ==
As of 2021 there are over 915 National Teaching Fellows, with up to 55 individuals receiving the award each year. Current and former National Teaching Fellows include:

- Lara Alcock
- Tim Birkhead
- Tom Crick
- Robert Eaglestone
- Sally Fincher
- Adam Hart
- Duncan Lawson
- Liz Mossop
- Jane Setter
- Sarah Speight
- Richard Wilding
