= University of Nottingham School of Veterinary Medicine and Science =

Veterinary school of the University of Nottingham

- Type: Veterinary school
- Established: 2006
- Accreditation: RCVS (2011); EAEVE (2017); AVMA (2022)
- Affiliations: University of Nottingham
- Foundation Dean: Gary England
- Location: Sutton Bonington Campus, Loughborough, England; 52.8288°N 1.2491°W
- Website: nottingham.ac.uk/vet

The University of Nottingham School of Veterinary Medicine and Science is a veterinary school at the University of Nottingham in the United Kingdom. It admitted its first cohort of 84 veterinary students in 2006.

== History ==
The School of Veterinary Medicine and Science at the University of Nottingham was established in 2006 at the Sutton Bonington Campus in Nottinghamshire. Its creation was driven in part by the aftermath of the 2001 foot-and-mouth disease outbreak in the United Kingdom, which highlighted shortages in veterinary capacity and the need for expanded veterinary education and training provision.

The School admitted its first cohort of 84 veterinary students in 2006 for its Bachelor of Veterinary Medicine programme. It was the first new veterinary school to be established in the United Kingdom for over 50 years.

In 2019, it increased its annual intake of students by adding a second cohort, starting in April each year, along with its September cohort each year. Enrollment has increased to approximately 300 students per year, delivered across the two cohorts of around 150 students each, alongside continued development of its teaching facilities, clinical training partnerships, and research activities. It developed a teaching internship programme in 2016.

== Degrees awarded ==
The School awards jointly the Bachelor of Veterinary Medicine and Bachelor of Veterinary Surgery (BVM BVS) degree. Students also receive an Bachelor of Veterinary Medical Sciences (BVMedSci) degree upon completion of the third year of study.

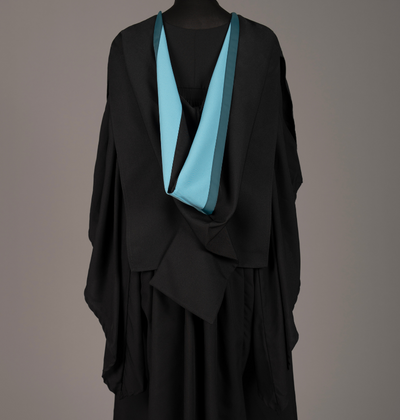
BVMedSci graduation attire

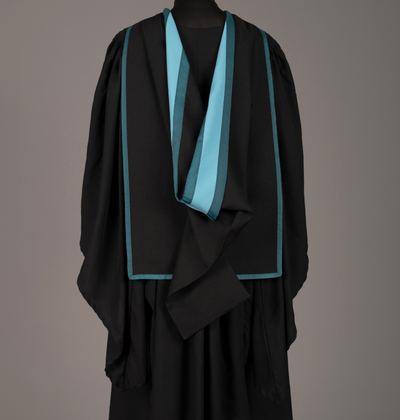
BVM BVS graduation attire

== Campus and facilities ==
The School of Veterinary Medicine and Science is based at the Sutton Bonington Campus of the University of Nottingham.

Its £5.5 million Gateway Building was completed in 2011 as part of a wider campus masterplan. The building houses facilities for veterinary and biosciences teaching, and is one of the largest straw-bale buildings in Europe. It is used primarily to teach the students on the preliminary and gateway veterinary medicine and surgery courses.

A major expansion of clinical teaching facilities was completed in 2024 with the opening of the £3 million Sir Peter Rubin Veterinary Education Centre. The facility includes a mock veterinary practice with consulting rooms, operating theatres, kennels, and teaching spaces designed to simulate clinical environments. It is primarily used for clinical skills training and final-year veterinary education, and has been designed with the potential for future conversion into a functioning veterinary practice.

The North Laboratory (AKA “The Super Lab”) was refurbished to modernise and expand large-group practical teaching capacity, providing improved laboratory space for biosciences and veterinary students. In addition, the Barn, home of the Sutton Bonington Student Guild, was constructed to provide dedicated social, welfare, and activity space for students at Sutton Bonington Campus.
