= Teaching fellow =

Particular teaching role at some universities

A teaching fellow (sometimes referred to as a TF) is an individual at a higher education institution, including universities, whose work involves teaching and potentially pedagogic research. The work done by teaching fellows can vary significantly from institution to institution, depending on the requirements and position of each one.

== United Kingdom and Ireland ==
In the UK and Ireland, teaching fellows are typically full members of academic staff who are involved in teaching. Teaching fellows can undertake the full range of teaching, pastoral and administrative duties, and can also be involved in research activity, specifically pedagogic research. Their responsibilities can include developing innovative learning materials, mentoring colleagues and contributing to staff development activities, shaping the faculty's and the university's agenda in learning and teaching and spreading good practice in learning, teaching and assessment. Other UK institutions may use the title of teaching fellow as an additional accolade, awarded to a member of academic staff who has shown excellence in teaching.

Teaching fellows may have the same rank and pay as 'traditional' research-active academic staff, although this depends on the attitude of the individual department and the institution. The equivalence in rank and status is relatively new in some institutions, since teaching fellows in the past were sometimes paid at a grade lower than their research-active colleagues.

Teaching fellows are present at a number of institutions across the UK. Institutions such as UCL as well as The Robert Gordon University in Aberdeen and the universities of Aberdeen, Stirling, Bristol, Manchester and Newcastle all employ academics known as teaching fellows. Thus, a senior teaching fellow may have the same salary, status and teaching responsibilities as a senior lecturer. Teaching fellows in institutions such as the University of Aberdeen may also potentially reach the rank of professor.

The University of Reading runs a University Teaching Fellowship scheme that was launched in 2007/8. The scheme is open to academic and support staff across the university and it has awarded so far 21 University and 11 Early Career Teaching Fellowships since it was launched. The criteria for the scheme is consistent with the Higher Education Academy's National Teaching Fellowship Scheme (NTFS).

=== National Teaching Fellowship Scheme ===
The National Teaching Fellowship Scheme recognises and rewards individual excellence in teaching in higher education in the UK and supports individuals' professional development in learning and teaching. The National Teaching Fellows (NTFs) are an active community, currently consisting of 643 NTFs from more than 40 disciplines.

The Association of National Teaching Fellows (ANTF) promotes innovation and supports the sharing of best practice. National Teaching Fellows automatically become a member of the ANTF. The Committee of the Association of the National Teaching Fellows (CANTF) organises the ANTF's work and is the official voice of the association.

== United States ==
In the U.S. a teaching fellow has several possible meanings:

- An alternate term for a graduate teaching assistant
- A graduate teaching assistant whose degree program requires them to teach.
- A graduate student fellowship whose responsibilities include but are not limited to teaching.
- An advanced graduate student who serves as the primary instructor for an undergraduate course. Known as teaching fellows at many private universities, such as Harvard University, Boston College, and Boston University, they are also referred to as graduate student instructors (GSIs) at some other universities, such as the University of Michigan and the University of California system. Typically, TFs teach courses in their area of research specialty, in which they hold a master's degree or equivalent. Teaching fellows differ from teaching assistants in that they are responsible for all aspects of the course, including lecture, whereas TAs assist the instructor by performing ancillary course-related tasks such as grading and holding discussion section or laboratory. Many (about two-thirds) of the graduate students who have served as TAs serve as a TF for one or more classes each semester. Although TFs are fairly autonomous in their duties, many universities, such as the University of Pittsburgh, require supervision of TFs by professors experienced in teaching the course content, with whom TFs must hold regular meetings and receive feedback about the quality of their teaching. As a general rule, TFs receive a higher stipend than TAs in accordance with the greater responsibility and time commitment of a teaching fellowship, but like TAs, their contracts are renewed on a semester-by-semester basis, and they cannot be granted tenure. However, many state universities, such as Florida State University and the University of Florida, do not use the title "teaching fellow", and "teaching assistants" are the sole instructors of many classes. They are not required to have a master's degree, and do not usually teach in their area of research specialization, but rather introductory courses in such fields as English Composition (writing) and foreign languages, in which class size must be limited, large lectures are impractical, and multiple "sections" of the same course run simultaneously. Usually a full-time instructor or professor supervises all the sections of a given course, though the extent of supervision and coordination can vary significantly from one school or one course to another.

== India ==
To tackle faculty shortage in the university departments, Anna University recruits postgraduates on contract basis and allow them to complete their doctoral degrees on the job. Candidates are shortlisted through a written test and an interview. Candidates are given the opportunity to pursue their PhD in the university departments simultaneously as they teach. Technically they are employed only for six months, but contracts get renewed through the years, they do almost the same job as regular staff, but receive what has been described as an "abysmally low" salary.

== See also ==
- Research assistant
