= SIGCSE =

Special Interest Group on Computer Science Education

ACM SIGCSE
- Founded: 1970
- Purpose: Computer science education
- Region served: International
- Key people: Brian Dorn
- Website: sigcse.org

The Special Interest Group on Computer Science Education (SIGCSE) is the special interest group of Association for Computing Machinery, which provides a forum for educators to discuss issues related to the development, implementation, and/or evaluation of computing programs, curricula, and courses, as well as syllabi, laboratories, and other elements of teaching and pedagogy. SIGCSE is also the colloquial name for the SIGCSE Technical Symposium on Computer Science Education, which is the largest of the four conferences organized by SIGCSE.

The main focus of SIGCSE is higher education, though discussions include improving computer science education at high school level and below. The membership level has held steady at around 3300 members for several years.

== Conferences ==
SIGCSE has four large annual conferences:

1. The SIGCSE Technical Symposium on Computer Science Education is held in North America with an average annual attendance of approximately 1600 attendees in recent years.
2. The ACM Conference on Innovation and Technology in Computer Science Education (ITiCSE) has around 200-300 annual attendees and is mainly held in Europe, but has also been held in countries outside of Europe, such as Israel in 2012 and Peru in 2016. The next ITiCSE will be held from July 8 to July 10, hosted by the University of Università degli Studi di Milano in Milan, Italy.
3. The ACM Conference on International Computing Education Research (ICER) has about 70 attendees and is held in the United States every other year. On alternate years, it rotates between Europe and Australasia. The most recent conference was held from August 12 to August 15, 2024, in Melbourne, Australia. The next conference will be held from August 3 to August 6, 2025, in Charlottesville, Virginia.
4. The ACM Global Computing Education Conference (CompEd) is held at locations outside of the typical North American and European locations. The first conference was held in Chengdu, China between the 17th and 19 May 2019. The second was held in Hyderabad, India, from December 7 to December 9, 2023. The third is planned to be held in Botswana in 2025. It is planned for CompEd to be held every other year.

== Newsletter/Bulletin ==
The SIGCSE Bulletin is an newsletter published once a quarter, started in 1969. Today, it is published electronically.

== Awards ==
SIGCSE has two main awards that are given out annually.

1. The Outstanding Contribution to Computer Science Education is given annually since 1981.
2. The SIGCSE Lifetime Service to Computer Science Education has been awarded annually since 1997.

== SIGCSE Board ==
The current SIGCSE Board for 2025 – 2028 is:

- Brian Dorn, Chair
- Claudia Szabo, Vice-chair
- Michelle Friend, Treasurer
- Mark Sherriff, Secretary
- Oluwakemi Ola, member at-large
- Ethel Tshukudo, member at-large
- Chris Gregg, at-large member
- Alison Clear, past chair

SIGCSE Chairs over the years:

- Alison Clear, 2022-26
- Adrienne Decker, 2019–22
- Amber Settle, 2016–19
- Susan H. Rodger, 2013–16
- Renee McCauley, 2010–2013
- Barbara Boucher Owens, 2007–10
- Henry Walker, 2001–2007
- Bruce Klein, 1997–01
- Lillian N. Cassel, 1993–97
- Nell B. Dale, 1991–93
