= Computing education =

Pedagogy of computer science

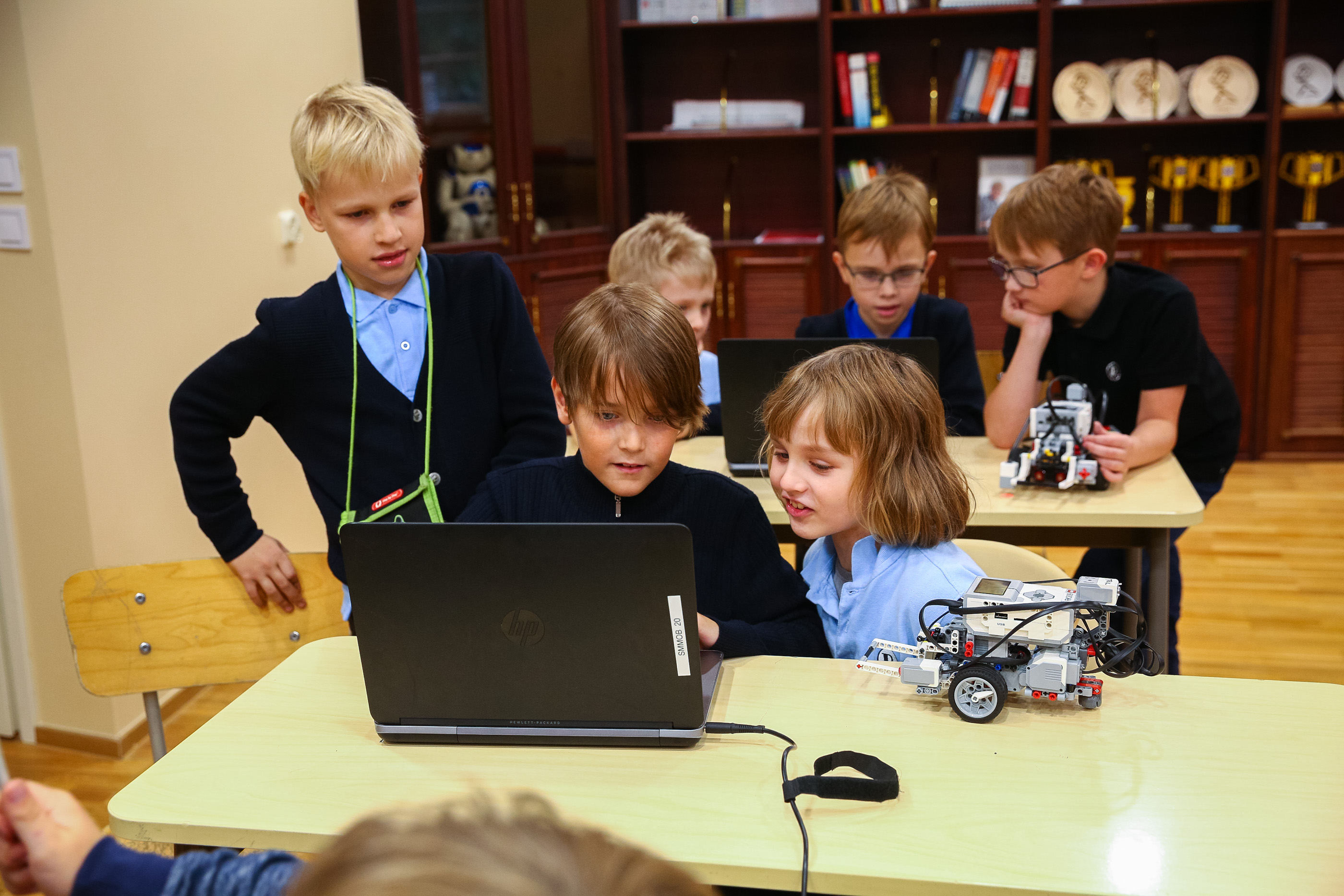
Elementary school children coding in a robotics programme

Computer science education or computing education is the field of teaching and learning the discipline of computer science and computational thinking. The field of computer science education encompasses a wide range of topics, from basic programming skills to advanced algorithm design and data analysis. It is a rapidly growing field that is essential to preparing students for careers in the technology industry as well as other fields that require computational skills.

Computer science education is essential to preparing students for the 21st century workforce. As technology becomes increasingly integrated into all aspects of society, the demand for skilled computer scientists is growing. According to the Bureau of Labor Statistics, employment of computer and information technology occupations is projected to "grow 21 percent from 2021 to 2031", much faster than the average for all occupations.

In addition to preparing students for careers in the technology industry, computer science education also promotes computational thinking skills, which are valuable in many fields, including business, healthcare, and education. By learning to think algorithmically and solve problems systematically, students can become more effective problem solvers and critical thinkers.

== Background ==
In the early days of computer programming, there wasn't really a need for setting up any kind of education system, as the only people working with computers at the time were early scientists and mathematicians. Computer programming wasn’t popular enough to be widely taught, nor was it developed enough for non-experts to benefit from it. It was soon realized however, that mathematicians were not a good fit for computer science work and that there would be a need for people fully focused around the subject. As time went on, there was a greater need for those who were specifically trained in computer programming to match the demands of a world becoming more and more dependent on the use of computers. Initially, only colleges and universities offered computer programming courses, but as time went on, high schools and even middle schools implemented computer science programs.

In comparison to science education and mathematics education, computer science (CS) education is a much younger field. In the history of computing, digital computers were only built from around the 1940s – although computation has been around for centuries since the invention of analog computers.

Another differentiator of computer science education is that it has primarily only been taught at university level until recently, with some notable exceptions in Israel, Poland and the United Kingdom with the BBC Micro in the 1980s as part of Computer science education in the United Kingdom. Computer science has been a part of the school curricula from age 14 or age 16 in a few countries for a few decades, but has typically as an elective subject.

Primary and secondary computer science education is relatively new in the United States, with many K-12 CS teachers facing obstacles such as professional isolation, limited professional development resources, and low teaching self-efficacy. According to a 2021 report, only 51% of high schools in the US offer computer science. Elementary CS teachers in particular have lower CS teaching efficacy and have fewer chances to implement CS into their instruction than their middle and high school peers. Connecting CS teachers to resources and peers using methods such as virtual communities of practice has been shown to help CS and STEM teachers improve their teaching self-efficacy and implement CS topics into student instruction.

== Generative AI and computing education ==
Generative AI is becoming more popular and widespread in the public sector. Both teachers and students have reported believing that it is a useful educational tool, while expressing concerns about over-reliance during learning. Generative AI has been known to hallucinate information, causing concerns for the trustworthiness of the information it provides. More work on how to use these tools needs to occur for effective teaching.

== Curriculum ==
Computing education benefits from using different tools and strategies at different points in a student's development, ensuring they get the most out of the teaching. Visual programming languages, such as Scratch and MIT App Inventor, are effective in elementary and middle schools as an introduction to how programming languages function, using a block-based programming structure. Once students have understood the basics of programming through these languages, teachers move on to an easy-to-use text-based programming language, such as Python, where syntax is simpler compared to more complex languages. Generally, students are taught with languages that are used among professional businesses and programmers so that they can become familiar with languages used in the workforce. Thus, in high school and college, classes tend to focus on more complex uses of Python as well as other languages such as Java, C++, and HTML.

== Teaching methods ==
Effective teaching methods in computer science often differ from that of other subjects as the standard slideshow and textbook format often used in schools has been found to be less effective compared to standard academic subjects. Due to the problem-solving nature of computer science, a kind of problem focused curriculum has been found to be the most effective, giving students puzzles, games, or small programs to interact with and create. Rather than applying techniques or strategies learned to tests or quizzes, students must use material learned in class to complete the programs and show they are following the class. On top of this, it has been found that developing teaching methods that seek to improve and guide students problem-solving and creative abilities tend to help them succeed in computer science and other classes. The problem-solving aspect of computer science education is often the hardest part to deal with as many students can struggle with the concept, especially when it is likely they have not had to apply in such a way before this point.

Another recent development is the rise of online coding courses and coding bootcamps. Due to the nature of computer science as a discipline, there are many who realize there interest for it only later in life, or maybe it wasn't widely available when they attend high school or college. These opportunities often involve rigorous courses that are more geared to getting people ready for the workforce rather than a more academic focus. Coding bootcamps have become a great way for people to break out into the computer science market without having to go to school all over again.

=== Algorithm visualization ===
Example of data visualization that illustrates an algorithm to generate partitions.

It can be difficult to effectively teach the interactive components of computing or the way an algorithm works with static text and images that are popular in textbooks and lectures. Instructors often utilize document cameras or classroom boards to draw out the processes and supplement the verbal explanation. The drawings are subject to frequent changes throughout the walkthrough of the process, causing challenges for students to grasp the concepts. To combat this problem, an interest in Algorithm visualization has developed to demonstrate dynamic systems.

Algorithm visualization dates back to the early 1980’s with Baecker's Sorting Out Sorting publication. If used effectively, it can graphically demonstrate different states of algorithms in engaging ways. This helps students focus on the conceptual aspects of a process without worrying about the implementation such as memory addresses and specific function calls. Increased use of algorithm visualization engagement by students typically results in better learning for the students.

Algorithm visualization can be used for a myriad of different topics. Data structures, graph algorithms, and sorting algorithms are all examples of computation based concepts where students can benefit from learning about with the aid of an algorithm visualization.

== Computing education research ==
Computing education research (CER) or Computer science education research is an interdisciplinary field that focuses on studying the teaching and learning of computer science. It is a subfield of both computer science and education research, and is concerned with understanding how computer science is taught, learned, and assessed in a variety of settings, such as K-12 schools, colleges and universities, and online learning environments. With this in mind, it is natural that CER borrow theories and methodologies from both educational sciences as well as computing in general, eg frameworks from HCI, usability and sociology as well as engineering and software development.

=== Background ===
Computer science education research emerged as a field of study in the 1970s, when researchers began to explore the effectiveness of different approaches to teaching computer programming. Since then, the field has grown to encompass a wide range of topics related to computer science education, including curriculum design, assessment, pedagogy, and diversity and inclusion.

=== Topics of study ===
One of the primary goals of computer science education research is to improve the teaching and learning of computer science. To this end, researchers study a variety of topics, including:

=== Curriculum design ===
Researchers in computer science education seek to design curricula that are effective and engaging for students. This may involve studying the effectiveness of different programming languages, or developing new pedagogical approaches that promote active learning.

=== Assessment ===
Computer science education researchers are interested in developing effective ways to assess student learning outcomes. This may involve developing new measures of student knowledge or skills, or evaluating the effectiveness of different assessment methods.

=== Pedagogy ===
Researchers in computer science education are interested in exploring different teaching methods and instructional strategies. This may involve studying the effectiveness of lectures, online tutorials, or peer-to-peer learning.

=== Diversity and inclusion ===
Computer science education researchers are interested in promoting diversity and inclusion in computer science education. This may involve studying the factors that contribute to under representation of certain groups in computer science, and developing interventions to promote inclusivity and equity.

== Research communities ==
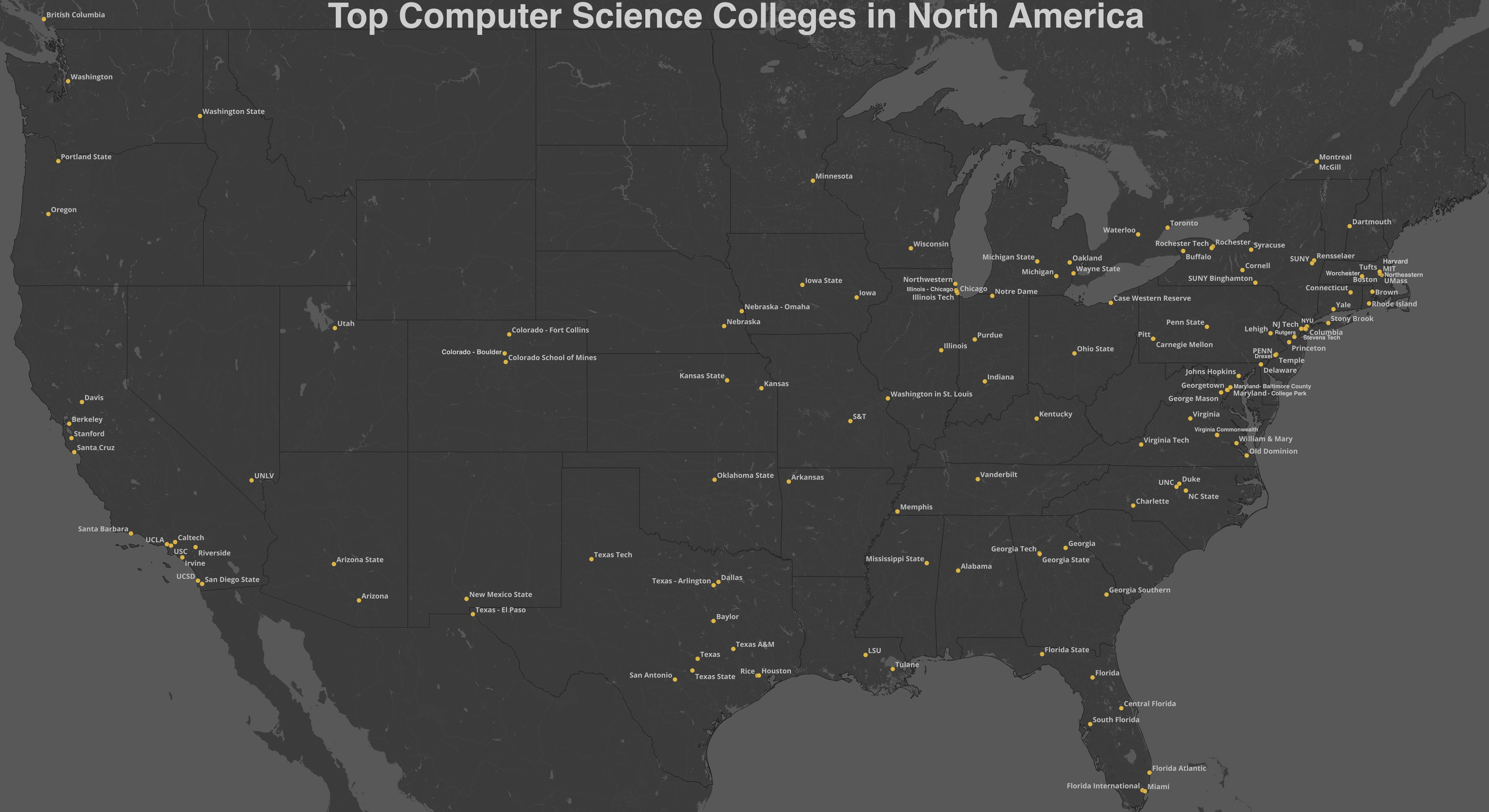
Top computer science colleges in North America

The Association for Computing Machinery (ACM) runs a Special Interest Group (SIG) on Computer science education known as SIGCSE which celebrated its 50th anniversary in 2018, making it one of the oldest and longest running ACM Special Interest Groups. An outcome of computing education research are Parsons problems.

== Gender perspectives in computer science education ==
In many countries, there is a significant gender gap in computer science education. In 2015, 15.3% of computer science students graduating from non-doctoral granting institutions in the US were women while at doctoral granting institutions, the figure was 16.6%. The number of female PhD recipients in the US was 19.3% in 2018. Almost everywhere in the world, the numbers of women enrolled in computer science programs are higher

This Euro-American problem mainly arises due to the lack of female interest in computing starting from primary school. Despite numerous efforts by programs specifically designed to increase the ratio of women in this field, no significant improvement has been observed. Furthermore, a declining trend has been noticed in the involvement of women in past decades.

The main reason for the failure of these programs is because almost all of them focused on girls in high school or higher levels of education. Researchers argue that by then women have already made up their mind and stereotypes start to form about computer scientists. Computer science is perceived as a male dominated field, pursued by people who are nerdy and lack social skills.

Evidently, there are a few countries in Asia and Africa where these stereotypes do not exist and women are encouraged for a career in science starting at the primary level, thus resulting in a gender gap that is virtually nonexistent. In 2011, women earned half of the computer science degrees in Malaysia. In 2001, 55 percent of computer science graduates in Guyana were women. In the formerly colonized world, the stereotype that women are intellectually less capable at maths or sciences than men has not propagated due to the historical refusal of racial stereotypes and hierarchies of intelligence. As such, the question of gender in science is intricately linked to the question of race in science.

== Accessibility ==
Both government and private industry are showing increasing interest in developing software that is accessible to everyone, including people with disabilities. Although there is a strong demand, only 2% of industry leaders indicate that finding candidates with the required accessibility skills is easy or very easy. As a result, teaching accessibility in computer science classrooms is becoming more important, which involves the communication of metainformation surrounding information and accessibility. Current approaches include course integration and teaching accessibility knowledge.

Course integration takes multiple disciplines and combines them into one class or program. There are three main types of integration: special topics courses, thematic courses, and module integration. Special topic courses is when a given discipline is the entire topic of a course, i.e. a course on accessibility within an information school. Thematic courses are when a class is not about a given topic directly, but rather use a topic as a focus or lens to teach the primary topic, for example teaching user experience design through the perception of disabled users. Module Integration teaches a given topic in an isolated unit, like a web design class having a unit on optimizing a website for screen-readers.

Teaching accessibility knowledge directly teaches accessibility throughout an entire program by teaching how a subfield can encourage accessible practices. This includes, but is not limited to, screen readers, adaptive keyboards, and screen magnifiers, captioning and subtitle services, and diction software. These can be applicable in several computational subfields such has web development, human computer interaction, and software engineering.

There exists a gap in the support that instructors have while teaching accessibility that is rooted in a lack of knowledge on the different approaches to teaching accessibility. University of Washington, Gallaudet University, Tufts University, and University of California Irvine have collaborated with AccessComputing, a program designed to help instructors and students increase disability representation in careers in computing.

== Recent trends and developments ==
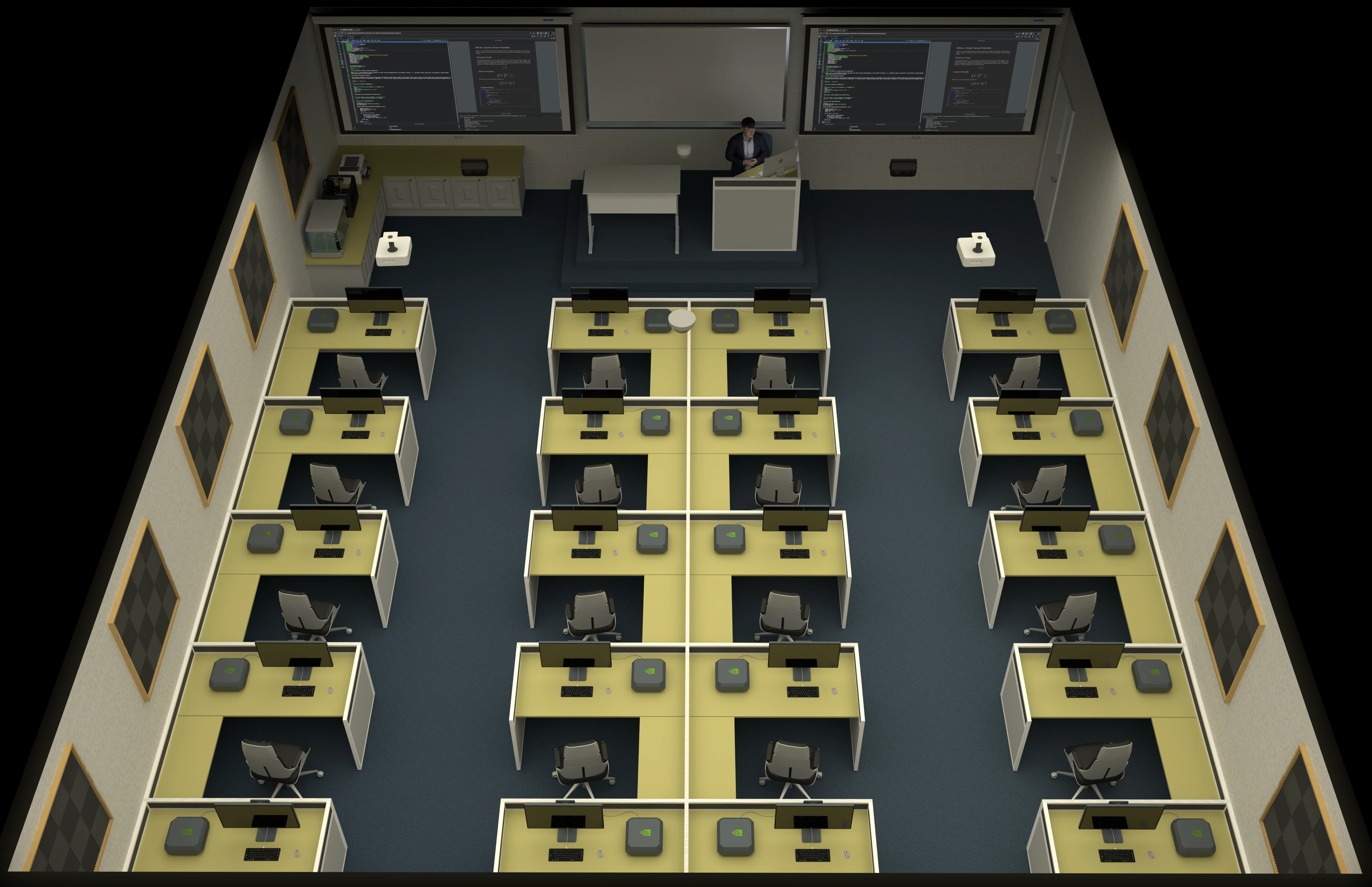
3D design of cubicle desks to get computers to the desk for a computational education

Recently, computational education has had an increased emphasis on incorporating computational knowledge into education on all levels. This is due to the world becoming more and more technologically driven. Organizations like Code.org and initiatives like the Hour of Code, and massive open online courses (MOOCs) have played a significant role in promoting computer science education and making coding accessible to students worldwide; especially making a difference for women, underprivileged and underrepresented communities. These online learning platforms have also made computing education more accessible, allowing individuals to learn coding remotely. Additionally, we see technology increasingly being found in numerous fields like health, business and technology.

== Challenges ==
Over the years, computing education has faced several issues that have contributed to its lack of popularity. One of the most impactful of these issues is the equipment cost of effectively teaching the discipline. In the past, there were not many affordable options for providing computers for each and every student that wanted to learn the discipline. Due to this, computing education suffered in many areas with little to no funding left over to adequately teach the subject. This is the main reason why computing education is either extremely lackluster or non-existent in many schools across the United States and UK. The subject's unpopularity for many years mostly stems from it being reserved for those who could afford the necessary equipment and software to effectively teach it.

There have also been issues with finding and training good teachers for the subject. Many schools in the past didn't see the value in paying for training for teachers to be able to teach computer science or get the licenses required. This has led to many schools in disadvantaged areas, or simply areas with not a lot of people, to struggle to hire the teachers necessary to provide a good computer science curriculum. Another issue with the teacher side of the discipline is the nature of computer science itself, and that a standard teaching structure using slides and textbooks has often been found to be ineffective. Computer science is a very problem solving oriented subject and it has often been found that teaching can be more effective when approaching it from this perspective rather than the standard lecture format.

Computer science is also notorious for being a very difficult subject in schools, with high failure and dropout rates over the years it has been taught. This is usually attributed to the fact that computer science as a subject is very problem-solving heavy and a lot of students can struggle with this aspect. This is especially true for high-school, where few other subjects demand as high caliber of problem-solving ability as computer science. This is compounded by the fact that computer science is a very different discipline from most other subjects, meaning that many students who encounter it for the first time can struggle a lot.

Despite the challenges faced by the discipline, computer science continues to grow in popularity as a subject as technology grows and computers become more and more important in the classroom as well as in everyday life.

== See also ==
- Tech ed
- Career and technical education
- List of AI-assisted software development tools
- List of computer magazines, List of computer books, and List of computer science journals.
- List of educational software and List of online educational resources
- List of free and open-source software packages
