= Sarita Schoenebeck =

American computer scientist

- Born: Sarita Ann Yardi
- Education: Georgia Institute of Technology; University of California, Berkeley; Dartmouth College
- Scientific career
- Workplaces: University of Michigan
- Thesis: Social media at the boundaries : supporting parents in managing youth's social media use (2013)
- Website: https://yardi.people.si.umich.edu/

Sarita Yardi Schoenebeck is an American computer scientist at the University of Michigan, where she serves as Director of the Living Online Lab. Her research considers human–computer interactions, social media and social computing. She was awarded the University of Michigan School of Information Diversity, Equity and Inclusion Award in 2017 for her work on LGBTQ+ families and online communities.

== Early life and education ==
Schoenebeck is from California and is of Indian and Australian descent. She was an undergraduate student in engineering at Dartmouth College. As an undergraduate student played tennis, and earned first team all-ivy honours three times. She moved to the University of California, Berkeley for her graduate studies, where she completed a Master's in information management. She was selected as the 2006 UC Berkeley School of Information Class Speaker. Schoenebeck was a doctoral researcher at Georgia Tech, where she studied ways that parents could support young people's use of social media.

== Research and career ==
Schoenebeck was appointed to the faculty at the University of Michigan School of Information in 2012, first as an Assistant then Associate Professor. At the University of Michigan, she serves as Director of the Living Online Lab. Her research considers how social media platforms can contend with the negative impacts their users experience. Supported by the National Science Foundation, Schoenebeck studied how the principles of justice can play a role in reducing online harassment. As part of this work, she evaluated how internet users experience, assess and respond to online abuse, as well as developing restorative justice interventions that looked to reduce online harassment. She demonstrated that community-centred approaches, including active bystander training, were effective in mitigating online harassment. These findings informed a series of workshops that sought to educate young people about ways to tackle online harassment. She found that the public shaming of online harassers was not enough to address the injustice experienced by victims. Schoenebeck has also studied what young people expect of their parents when it comes to social media use. She found that children wanted their parents to moderate their use of technology and be present (i.e. to put phones away when talking to one another), to supervise their children's use (establish ground rules for their children) and not to share photographs of their children without their permission.

In 2017, Schoenebeck was awarded the University of Michigan School of Information Diversity, Equity and Inclusion Award in 2017 for her work on LGBTQ+ families and online communities. She was supported by the John S. and James L. Knight Foundation to investigate ways that digital platforms can reduce harms such as hate speech and harassment. Schoenebeck proposed that this could be achieved by expanding Section 230, forcing digital platforms to stop prioritising engagement over the protection of users. She also currently serves as a faculty affiliate of the Science, Technology, and Public Policy (STPP) program through the Gerald R. Ford School of Public Policy.

== Awards and honors ==
- 2016: National Science Foundation CAREER Award
- 2016: Special Interest Group on Human-Computer Interaction (SIGCHI) Best of CHI Award
- 2017: University of Michigan School of Information Diversity, Equity and Inclusion Award
- 2019: Michigan Institute for Data Science Propelling Original Data Science Award
- 2020: University of Michigan Michael D. Cohen Outstanding Service Award
- 2020: John S. and James L. Knight Foundation Fellowship
- 2025: ACM Distinguished Member

== Selected publications ==
- Sarita Yardi; Danah Boyd (14 September 2010). "Dynamic Debates: An Analysis of Group Polarization Over Time on Twitter". Bulletin of Science. 30 (5): 316–327. doi:10.1177/0270467610380011. ISSN 0270-4676. Wikidata Q56289343.
- Lindsay Blackwell; Jean Hardy; Tawfiq Ammari; Tiffany Veinot; Cliff Lampe; Sarita Schoenebeck (2016). LGBT Parents and Social Media. Proceedings of the CHI Conference on Human Factors in Computing Systems. doi:10.1145/2858036.2858342. ISBN 978-1-4503-3362-7. Wikidata Q84319008.
- Joseph B. Bayer; Nicole B. Ellison; Sarita Y. Schoenebeck; Emily B. Falk (18 September 2015). "Sharing the small moments: ephemeral social interaction on Snapchat". Information. 19 (7): 956–977. doi:10.1080/1369118x.2015.1084349. ISSN 1369-118X. Wikidata Q105624081.

== Personal life ==
Schoenebeck has a son.
