= University of Maryland Human–Computer Interaction Lab =

Research lab at the University of Maryland, College Park

Human-Computer Interaction Lab
- Abbreviation: HCIL
- Formation: 1983
- Founder: Ben Shneiderman
- Headquarters: Hornbake Library, College Park, Maryland
- Director: Joel Chan
- Parent organization: University of Maryland, College Park
- Affiliations: University of Maryland College of Information Studies, University of Maryland Institute for Advanced Computer Studies (UMIACS)
- Website: hcil.umd.edu

The Human–Computer Interaction Lab (HCIL) at the University of Maryland, College Park is an academic research center specializing in the field of human-computer interaction (HCI). Founded in 1983 by Ben Shneiderman, it is one of the oldest HCI labs of its kind. The HCIL conducts research on the design, implementation, and evaluation of computer interface technologies. Additional research focuses on the development of user interfaces and design methods. Primary activities of the HCIL include collaborative research, publication and the sponsorship of open houses, workshops and annual symposiums.

Being interdisciplinary in nature, HCIL collaborates on a broader basis with several academic departments and schools, with faculty and students from Information Studies, Computer Science, Education, English, Business, and Psychology. Currently, the lab is jointly supported by the College of Information Studies (iSchool) and the University of Maryland Institute for Advanced Computer Studies (UMIACS).

Research affiliated with the HCIL has led to several digital design principles based on Shneiderman's theory of direct manipulation. Early research contributions on hypertext, particularly hyperlinking, are popular UI design elements still widely used today. In 1989, the lab developed high-precision touchscreen applications for small keyboards that are now widely used on smartphones. Information visualization research on dynamic queries in the early 1990s led to the commercial Spotfire product and treemapping strategies. Notable developments in HCI within the 21st century include interfaces for digital libraries, multimedia resources for learning communities, and zooming user interfaces (ZUIs). Later contributions include technology design methodologies for children, mobile and pen-based computing, network analysis and visualization using NodeXL, and event analytics for electronic patient histories. Developments and research projects for each year are showcased at the lab's annual HCIL Symposium.

As of July 2026, the lab is directed by Joel Chan. Its previous directors are Ben Shneiderman (1983-2000), Ben Bederson (2000-2006), Allison Druin (2006–2011), Jen Golbeck (2011-2015), Mona Leigh Guha (interim director 2015), June Ahn (2015-2016), Niklas Elmqvist (2016-2021), Jessica Vitak (2021-2026), and Catherine Plaisant (acting director 1996).

== Contributions ==
=== Direct manipulation ===
Ben Shneiderman's theory of direct manipulation led to innovations in digital interface design, many developed under the HCIL. Direct manipulation interactions, in contrast to other interaction styles, require that objects of interest are represented as distinguishable objects in the UI and are manipulated in a direct fashion. In other words, direct manipulation tools provide a user with a visually-intuitive method to manipulate that object. Direct manipulation is characterized by four main principles: continuous representation of the object of interest; physical actions instead of complex syntax; rapid, incremental, and reversible operations whose impact on the object of interest is immediately visible; and layered or spiral approach to learning that permits usage with minimal knowledge. A famous example is the File Explorer, which is used to manage applications in the Microsoft Windows Operating System. In contrast to the command line interaction style, applications are abstractly represented as "files", while groups of files are collected in "folders". File abstractions, for instance, can be dragged and dropped into folders to manage and organize programs in an intuitive and visual manner.

=== Touchscreens ===
From 1988 to 1991, the HCIL worked on a series of projects regarding the use of touchscreens. These projects explored direct manipulation designs to improve the accuracy, precision, and usability of touchscreen technologies. At the time, touchscreen technology was imprecise and was generally "limited to targets larger than the average finger". Originally, corresponding actions from the touch of a finger were performed immediately on the screen (known as the "first touch" or "land on" strategy"), which would frequently lead to wrong target selections and calibration issues. The "lift-off" strategy was developed as an alternative technique for selection; this technique provides feedback for selection when a user's finger is on the screen, and select that target when the finger is lifted. After implementing a cursor slightly above a user's finger during selection, this effectively allowed a user's finger to replace a computer mouse. The "lift-off" strategy is still used in many touchscreen devices today, including the Apple iPhone.

In 1988, HCIL partnered with companies Elographic and Microtouch to build a high-precision touchscreen by integrating stabilizing techniques with the "lift-off" strategy into their touchscreen drivers. From then on, high-precision technology in touchscreens was possible. Using a combination of hyperTIES and high-precision touchscreen technology, it's believed that the HCIL developed the world's first touchscreen museum kiosk. A large-scale test of touchscreens was conducted that spring for the Caesarea (King Herod's Dream) Exhibit, a Smithsonian exhibit on archaeology. Development with touchscreens continued the following year with development of the Online Public Access Catalog for the Library of Congress.

Using direct manipulation interfaces through touchscreens, HCIL worked on two projects from 1988 to 1989: development of a home automation system in collaboration with American Voice and Robotics, and experimentation with toggles (buttons, sliders, etc.) on touchscreens. These projects introduced novel examples of how touchscreens can be used: selecting zones on maps, button type toggles, sliding toggles, and manipulation of calendar and time interfaces. In 2015, HCIL's "sliding" direct manipulation tool was cited as prior art in Apple Inc. v. Samsung Electronic Co., Ltd, which contested the patents of the "slide-to-unlock" lock screen feature on Apple devices.

=== Information visualization ===
HCIL developed three early applications of dynamic queries from 1991 to 1993. These applications include a chemical table of elements, a real estate HomeFinder, and a cancer atlas. These queries incorporate direct manipulation through dynamic sliders with a range of dates and a dynamically updating map. Chris Ahlberg, a major contributor on HomeFinder, left the lab and created Spotfire several years later in 1996.

== Events and outreach ==
HCIL collaborates with other departments, centers and labs on campus. It hosts academic and industrial visitors, and works closely with project sponsors.

The HCIL has hosted its annual symposium every year since the lab's inception. The symposium showcases developments, publications, and research projects for that year. Due to the COVID-19 pandemic, HCIL's 37th and 38th Annual Symposium were hosted virtually.

== Notable current and former members ==
- Ben Shneiderman, founding director (1983-2000), ACM CHI Academy member, ACM Fellow, member of the National Academy of Engineering, six honorary doctorates
- Kent Norman, founding member, Directory of the Laboratory for Automation Psychology
- Jenny Preece, lab member, ACM CHI Academy member, former Dean of the College of Information Studies at the University of Maryland, 2005-2015
- Ben Bederson, lab member and former director, ACM CHI Academy member, known for foundational work in zoomable interfaces
- Allison Druin, lab member and former director, ACM CHI Academy member, ACM CHI Social Impact Award winner, known for foundational work in participatory design with children and designing interactive technology for and with children, former lab director
- Catherine Plaisant, associate director, ACM CHI Academy member, IEEE Visualization Career Award winner, research scientist emerita
- Jen Golbeck, lab member, former lab director
- Niklas Elmqvist, former lab director (2016 to 2021)
- Don Hopkins, former student and pie menu creator
- Gary Marchionini, former lab member (now at University of North Carolina Chapel Hill, since 1998)
- Jean-Daniel Fekete, former lab visiting scientist, now at INRIA
- Andrew Sears, former PhD Student
- Karen Holtzblatt, CHI Academy member and ACM SIGCHI Lifetime Award for Practice
- Leah Findlater, former faculty member
- Jon Froehlich, former faculty member
- Jessica Vitak, former lab director
