= Jessica Vitak =

American information scientist

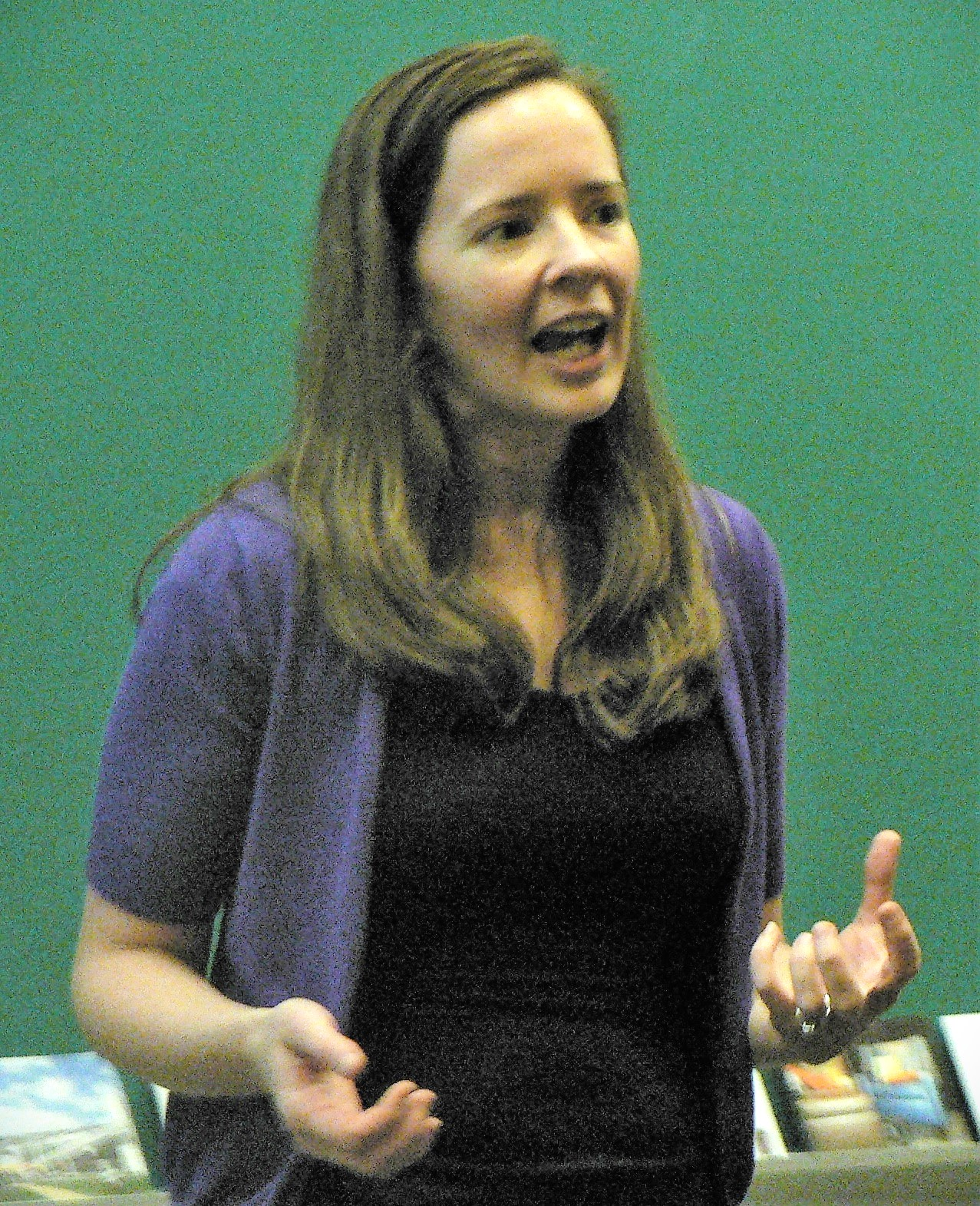
- Vitak lecturing in 2012
- Education: Michigan State University; Georgetown University; Elon University
- Scientific career
- Fields: Computer-mediated communication; Social Media; Big data ethics; Consumer privacy
- Workplaces: University of Maryland College of Information
- Thesis: Keeping connected in the Facebook age: the relationship between Facebook use, relationship maintenance strategies, and relational outcomes (2012)
- Website: https://jessicavitak.com

Jessica Vitak is an American information scientist who is a professor at the University of Maryland. She is faculty in the University of Maryland College of Information (iSchool) and Communication Department. She served as Director of the University of Maryland Human–Computer Interaction Lab (HCIL) and an Associate Member of the Social Data Science Center (SoDa).

== Early life and education ==
Vitak studied journalism and communication at Elon University. After completing undergraduate studies, she moved to Washington, D.C. and worked for PR Newswire. She earned a master's degree from Georgetown University in Communication, Culture, and Technology, where Dr. Linda Garcia was the advisor for her thesis titled Facebook "Friends": How Online Identities Impact Offline Relationships. While at Georgetown, she also worked as a research intern at the Pew Research Center. She earned her doctorate from Michigan State University, joining the research team of Nicole Ellison and Cliff Lampe. Her doctoral research investigated the relationship between Facebook use and maintenance strategies.

== Research and career ==
At UMD, Vitak was appointed as director of the Center for the Advanced Study of Communities and Information in 2016, and simultaneously became associate director of the Human Computer Interaction Lab. She became the director of HCIL in 2021. Vitak has continued to study how new technologies can benefit and harm humans. She studies the underlying motivations for people's behaviors, how humans perceive risks when they approach new technologies, and how policy makers can do more to convey critical information. She stepped down as director of the HCIL in 2026.

Vitak's research has focused on networked privacy and data ethics, identifying the privacy risks of new communication technologies and developing tools, curricula, games, and other resources to increase children and adults' understanding of privacy and security.

== Awards and honors ==
In 2025, Vitak was elected an ACM Distinguished Member.

== Selected publications ==
- Lenhart, Amanda (2008). Teens, video games, and civics. Pew Internet & American Life Project. OCLC 263976244.
- Vitak, Jessica; Zube, Paul; Smock, Andrew; Carr, Caleb T.; Ellison, Nicole; Lampe, Cliff (2011). "It's Complicated: Facebook Users' Political Participation in the 2008 Election". Cyberpsychology, Behavior, and Social Networking. 14 (3): 107–114. doi:10.1089/cyber.2009.0226. ISSN 2152-2715. PMID 20649449. S2CID 15543163.
- Vitak, Jessica (2012). "The impact of context collapse and privacy on social network site disclosures". Journal of Broadcasting & Electronic Media. 56 (4): 451–470. doi:10.1080/08838151.2012.732140. S2CID 55538443.
- Ellison, Nicole B.; Vitak, Jessica; Gray, Rebecca; Lampe, Cliff (2014-03-19). "Cultivating Social Resources on Social Network Sites: Facebook Relationship Maintenance Behaviors and Their Role in Social Capital Processes". Journal of Computer-Mediated Communication. 19 (4): 855–870. doi:10.1111/jcc4.12078. hdl:2027.42/108031. ISSN 1083-6101. S2CID 15898038.
