= International Children's Digital Library =

Library

The International Children's Digital Library Foundation (ICDL) is a free online library of digitized children's books in 59 languages from many countries. It is housed by the International Children's Digital Library Foundation and was originally developed at the University of Maryland, College Park.

== History ==
The International Children's Digital Library was initially launched in November 2002 under the direction of University of Maryland Computer Science professor Dr. Allison Druin and in collaboration with researchers from other fields, such as information studies, art, psychology, and education, in order to better understand children's online habits and to encourage a love of reading and increased literacy. Children from Bowie, Maryland, tested the original Java prototype from 1999 to 2002, and since then children from five locations around the world have also contributed to the design process as the library's "Kidsteam Program".

The 2002-2005 phase of development saw a working model of the Library accessed by over one million users around the world and home to 1,000 books. Funding initially came from the National Science Foundation and the Institute of Museum and Library Services.

In April 2006, the International Children's Digital Library became part of the newly formed International Children's Digital Library Foundation, a non-profit corporation under the leadership of Tim Browne as executive director and original project leaders Dr. Allison Druin, Dr. Ben Bederson, and Dr. Ann Weeks as Directors. The Library's principal support comes from the Library of Congress, National Science Foundation, the Institute of Museum and Library Services, and Microsoft Research.

In April 2021, after almost 20 years of existence, it was decided to take the service offline. However, the website went online again the next month with only the static content available.

== Description ==
The ICDL is a free online library of digitized children's books in 59 languages from various countries. Designed specifically for use by children ages 3 to 13, the Library is housed by the International Children's Digital Library Foundation. It was originally developed in the College of Information Studies and the Human-Computer Interaction Lab at the University of Maryland, College Park.

Books are selected based on quality and appropriateness and are presented in their original language with copyright permission from publishers or authors. The Library's ultimate goal is to foster a love of reading, a readiness to learn, and a response to the challenges of world literacy.

Children can search for books by country, language, length, intended age group, content type, and emotional quality, among other qualifiers. An advanced search option is also provided for more experienced or older users, and all users can register to save search preferences and favorite books.

The ICDL also hosts an online catalog of all White Ravens titles between 1993 and 2007, in collaboration with the International Youth Library.
