= Nassi =

Nassi may refer to:

- Nassi, French singer-songwriter of Moroccan origin
- Fabrizio Nassi (1951–2019), Italian Olympic volleyball player
- Isaac Nassi, computer scientist and businessman
- Maurizio Nassi (b. 1977), Italian footballer
- Thoma Nassi, Albanian composer. See Music of Albania.
- Thomas Nassi (1892-1964), Albanian-American musician and pioneering music educator
- Walid Nassi (b. 2000), French professional footballer
- Walter Nassi (b. 1946), restaurateur, a.k.a. Valter

== See also ==
- Nasi (Hebrew title), Biblical term for a leader
  - Judah the Prince, from the Hebrew 'Yehuda ha-Nasi' (fl. 3rd century), Jewish religious leader
- Joseph Nasi, 16th-century Jewish diplomat and administrator
- Nassi-Shneiderman diagram, graphical design representation for structured programming
- Nassoi, ancient city in Arcadia
