= Jean-Daniel Fekete =

French computer scientist

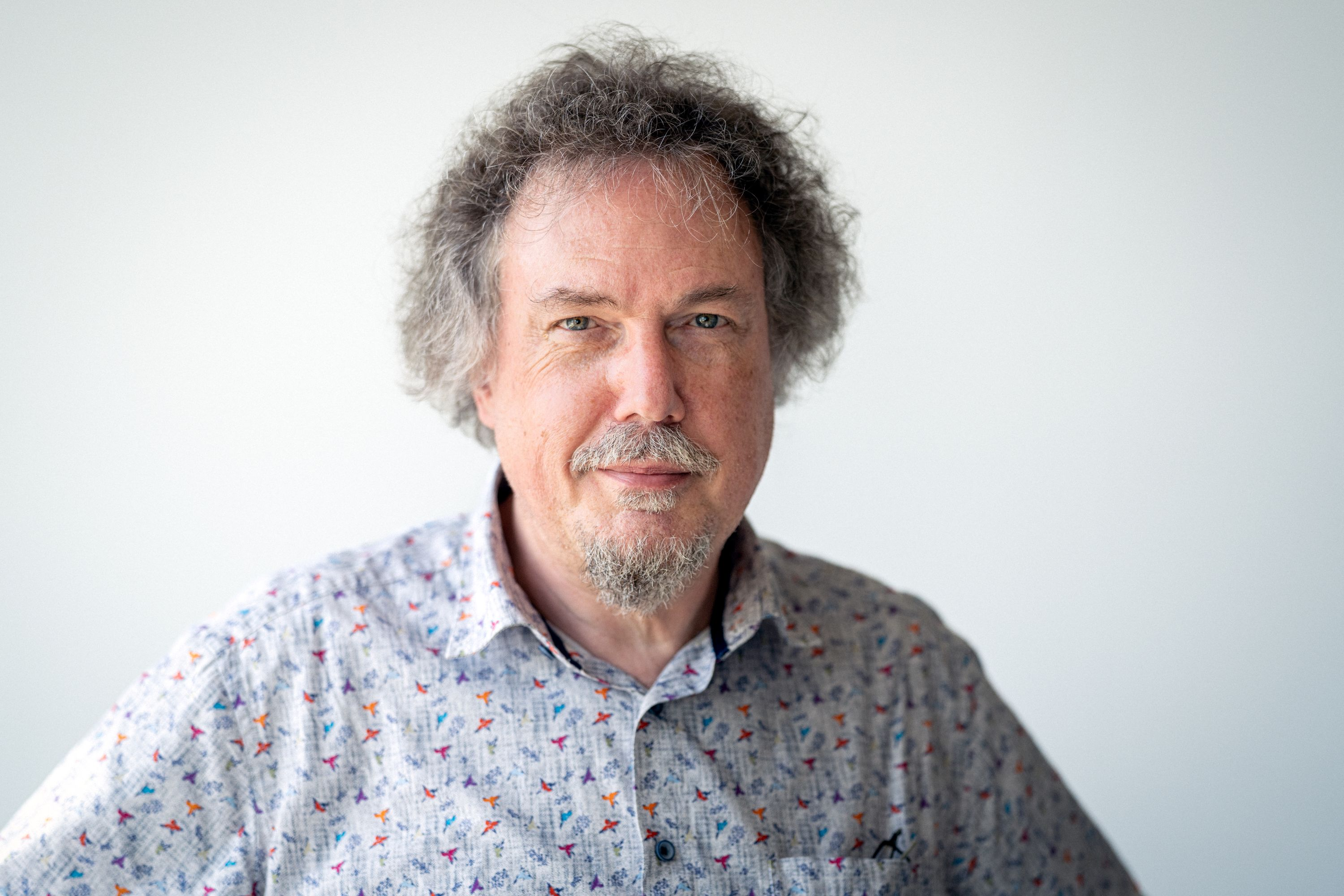
- Born: 12 April 1963 (age 63)
- Education: Paris-Sud 11 University (PhD)
- Awards: ACM CHI Academy (2020); IEEE VGTC Visualization Career Award (2020); IEEE VGTC Visualization Academy (2020)
- Scientific career
- Fields: Computer science (human–computer interaction, Information Visualization)
- Workplaces: INRIA Saclay
- Doctoral advisor: Michel Beaudouin-Lafon
- Doctoral students: Nathalie Henry Riche
- Website: www.aviz.fr/~fekete/

Jean-Daniel Fekete is a French computer scientist working in the field of information visualization and human-computer interaction.

== Education ==
Fekete received his PhD from the Paris-Saclay University in 1996.)

He obtained his Habilitation in 2005, entitled "Nouvelle génération d'Interfaces Homme-Machine pour mieux agir et mieux comprendre" (New generation of Human Machine Interfaces for better interacting and understanding) at Université Paris-Sud 11 (now Paris-Saclay University). The jury was Joëlle Coutaz, Saul Greenberg, Ben Shneiderman, Michel Beaudouin-Lafon, Jean-Gabriel Ganascia, Guy Mélançon, and Claude Puech.

As an undergraduate student he worked at the Centre Mondial Informatique et Ressource Humaine.

== Research ==
After an early career working in startups developing medical diagnostic expert systems and interactive 2D animation software, Fekete joined INRIA. He is currently the Scientific Leader of the Aviz group, which he created in 2006. Aviz is an INRIA group, and also part of Université Paris-Saclay.

Fekete's main fields of research are visual analytics, information visualization and human–computer interaction.

Fekete developed the Infovis Toolkit, a Java toolkit to facilitate the design of information visualization interfaces; and later expanded this work into the meta-toolkit Obvious.

He led the development of techniques for the interactive analysis of graphs using various representations including the early use of matrices, and their evaluation.

Making visualization more accessible to social scientists and historians has been a goal in the development of several tools, e.g., to analyze social networks, genealogical structures, or collections of structured documents.

Early work on large scale visualization led to contributions on progressive analytics as a method for managing big data analysis, and the organization of a Dagsthul seminar.

Additional research directions include visualization literacy, and data physicalization such as with the Zooid user interface, which received an award at UIST'2016.

From 2009 to 2012 Jean-Daniel Fekete was the president of l'AFIHM, the French national equivalent of Association for Computing Machinery SIGCHI. He has served as IEEE InfoVis Paper Co-Chair (2009–2010) and Conference Chair (2011). He was the general chair of the IEEE VisWeek 2014 conference (Paris, France).

From August 2001 to August 2002 Fekete was a visiting scientist at the University of Maryland Human-Computer Interaction Lab (HCIL), which he previously visited (July to August 1998) to develop "Excentric Labeling" along with Catherine Plaisant as a technique to display a high density of labels on maps.

== Awards ==
In 2020 Jean-Daniel Fekete was elected to the Association for Computing Machinery (ACM) CHI Academy, for his contributions to the field of study of human–computer interaction.

In October 2020 Fekete was recognized by IEEE VGTC with the 2020 Technical Achievement Award for "his research innovations in network visualization, visual analytics infrastructure, and data physicalization."
