= Dagobert Soergel =

Professor, author and consultant

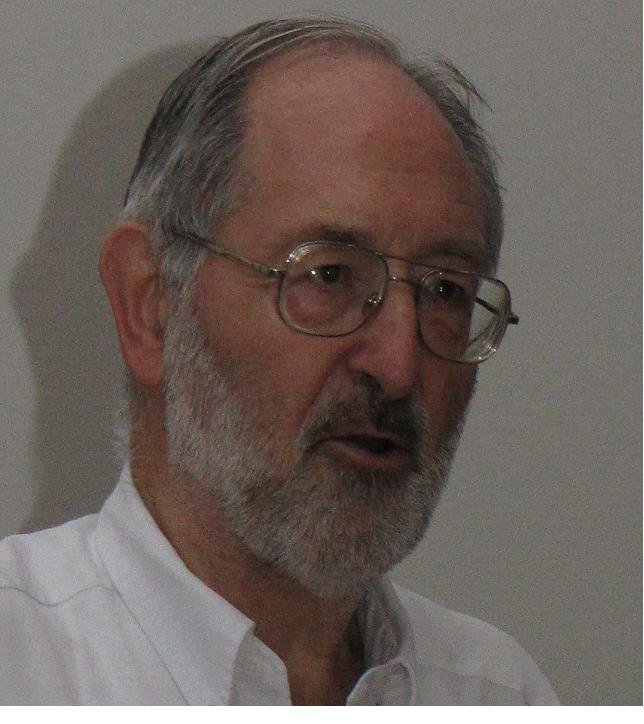
Dagobert Soergel

Dagobert Soergel (born 7 January 1940) is a professor, author and consultant working in the field of information science and information systems. He most recently served as an information science professor at the University of Buffalo Graduate School of Education and professor emeritus at the University of Maryland College of Library and Information Science.

== Early life and education ==
Born in Freiburg, Germany, Soergel obtained a B.S. degree in physics from the University of Freiburg in 1960. He obtained a M.S. degree in Mathematics and Physics at the same university in 1964. In 1967, Soergel graduated with an Assessor des Lehramts (a teaching certificate in high school/junior college) in Mathematics and Physics from the Staatliches Prüfungsamt Freiburg and a Dr.phil. (Ph.D.) in Political Science from the University of Freiberg in 1970.

== Career ==
=== Positions in higher education ===
Soergel began his professional career in Germany, working in international relations and political science. His career in education began in 1970, when he joined the University of Maryland College of Information as a visiting lecturer. He went on to serve as an associate professor and professor. Soergel also was a visiting professor at other library and information programs at the University of Chicago (Illinois), University of Konstanz (Germany), and Darmstadt University of Applied Sciences (Germany). In 2023, he retired from his role as professor at the University of Buffalo Department of Information Science.

=== Notable professional activities ===
In addition to his work in higher education, Soergel has served as an Information Technology and Services Consultant for more than 50 years. Soergel has acted as consultant for a range of institutions including the Smithsonian Institution (1975–1976), World Bank (1988–1989), Harvard Business School Library, Food and Drug Administration Center for Drugs (2003–2005), and International Monetary Fund (2020).

== Awards and recognition ==
Soergel's awards and honors include the American Society for Information Science Award of Merit (ASIST's highest award), which he received in 1997. He also received the ASIS Best Information Science Book Award from the organization a decade earlier in 1986 and award for Contributions to Information Science and Technology from the American Society for Information Science and Technology Los Angeles chapter in 2008/2009.

== Selection of published works ==
- Soergel, Dagobert, and Deutsche Gesellschaft für Dokumentation Komitee Thesaurusforschung. Klassifikationssysteme Und Thesauri; Eine Anleitung Zur Herstellung von Klassifikationssystemen Und Thesauri Im Bereich Der Dokumentation. Frankfurt am Main: Deutsche Gesellschaft für Dokumentation, 1969.
- Soergel, D. “A General Model for Indexing Languages:The Basis for Compatibility and Integration.” Subject Retrieval in the Sevenites:Proceedings of an International Symposium, University of Maryland, May 14–15, 1971, Edited by H, May 1, 1971.
- Soergel, Dagobert. Dokumentation Und Organisation Des Wissens. Versuch Einer Methodischen Und Theoretischen Grundlegung Am Beispiel Der Sozialwissenschaften. Berlin: Duncker & Humblot, 1971.
- Soergel, Dagobert. Indexing Languages and Thesauri: Construction and Maintenance. Los Angeles: Melville Pub. Co, 1974.
- Soergel, Dagobert. Organizing Information : Principles of Data Base and Retrieval Systems. Orlando, Fla.: Academic Press, 1985.
- Soergel, Dagobert. “The Rise of Ontologies or the Reinvention of Classification.” Journal of the American Society for Information Science 50, no. 12 (1999): 1119–20.
