= Keith Marzullo =

American computer scientist

- Education: Doctor of Philosophy Stanford University
- Alma mater: Stanford University, Occidental College
- Known for: Contributions to distributed systems
- Awards: ACM Fellow
- Scientific career
- Fields: distributed systems
- Workplaces: University of Maryland College of Information Studies, National Science Foundation, University of California San Diego, Cornell University, University of Massachusetts Amherst
- Thesis: Maintaining the time in a distributed system : an example of a loosely-coupled distributed service (1984)
- Doctoral advisors: Susan Owicki & Hugh Lauer
- Doctoral students: Lorenzo Alvisi

Keith Marzullo is the inventor of Marzullo's algorithm, which is part of the basis of the Network Time Protocol and the Windows Time Service. On August 1, 2016 he became the Dean of the University of Maryland College of Information Studies after serving as the Director of the NITRD National Coordination Office. Prior to this he was a Professor in the Department of Computer Science and Engineering at University of California, San Diego. In 2011 he was inducted as a Fellow of the Association for Computing Machinery. Marzullo was appointed Dean of the Manning College of Information and Computer Sciences (CICS) at the University of Massachusetts Amherst in 2025.

== Research ==
- RAMP (Reliable Adaptive Multipath Networks)
- GriPhyN (Master-worker computation in a wide-area network)
- MURI (Dependent failure models & Collaborative backup for withstanding network catastrophes)
- Mobility (Fault-tolerance for mobile agents & personal computational grids)

== Publications ==
=== 1999 ===
- Walfredo Cirne and Keith Marzullo. The computational Co-op: Gathering clusters into a metacomputer. Proceedings 13th International Parallel Processing Symposium and 10th Symposium on Parallel and Distributed Processing (IPPS/SPDP 1999). IEEE Computer Society 1999, pp. 160–6. Los Alamitos, CA, USA.
- Meng-Jang Lin and Keith Marzullo. Directional gossip: gossip in a wide area network. Dependable Computing - EDDC-3. Third European Dependable Computing Conference. Proceedings (Lecture Notes in Computer Science Vol.1667). Springer-Verlag. 1999, pp. 364–79. Berlin, Germany.
- Chanathip Namprempre, Jeremy Sussman, and Keith Marzullo. Implementing causal logging using OrbixWeb interception. Proceedings of the Fifth USENIX Conference on Object-Oriented Technologies and Systems (COOTS'99). USENIX Assoc. 1999, pp. 57–67. Berkeley, CA, USA.
- Dag Johansen, Keith Marzullo, and Kåre Lauvset. An approach towards an agent computing environment. Proceedings. 19th IEEE International Conference on Distributed Computing Systems. Workshops on Electronic Commerce and Web-based Applications. Middleware. IEEE Computer Society 1999, pp. 78–83. Los Alamitos, CA, USA.
- Dag Johansen, Keith Marzullo, Fred B. Schneider, Kjetil Jacobsen, and Dmitrii Zagorodnov. NAP: practical fault-tolerance for itinerant computations. Proceedings. 19th IEEE International Conference on Distributed Computing Systems (Cat. No.99CB37003). IEEE Computer Society 1999, pp. 180–9. Los Alamitos, CA, USA.

=== 2000 ===
- Meng-Jang Lin, Keith Marzullo and Stefano Massini. Gossip versus deterministically constrained flooding on small networks. In 14th International Conference on Distributed Computing (DISC 2000), Toledo, Spain, 4-6 Oct. 2000), pp. 253–267.
- Jeremy Sussman, Keith Marzullo and Idit Keidar. Optimistic Virtual Synchrony. In Proceedings 19th IEEE Symposium on Reliable Distributed Systems (SRDS-2000), Nürnberg, Germany, 16-18 Oct. 2000, pp. 42–51.
- Idit Keidar, Jeremy Sussman, Keith Marzullo and Danny Dolev. A client-server oriented algorithm for virtually synchronous group membership in WANs. In Proceedings 20th IEEE International Conference on Distributed Computing Systems, Taipei, Taiwan, 10–13 April 2000, pp. 356–365.

=== 2001 ===
- Lorenzo Alvisi, Thomas Bressoud, Amr El-Khasab, Keith Marzullo, and Dmitrii Zagorodnov. Wrapping Server-Side to Mask Connection Failures. INFOCOMM 2001, Anchorage, Alaska, 22–26 April 2001, pp. 329–337 Vol.1.
- Kåre J. Lauvset, Dag Johansen and Keith Marzullo, TOS: Kernel Support for Distributed Systems Management, Proceedings of the ACM Symposium on Applied Computing (SAC), Las Vegas, NV, March 2001.
- Karan Bhatia, Keith Marzullo, and Lorenzo Alvisi, Scalable Causal Message Logging for Wide-Area Environments, European conference on Parallel Computing (Euro-Par), Manchester, UK, August 2001.

=== 2002 ===
- Lorenzo Alvisi, Karan Bhatia, and Keith Marzullo, Causality tracking in causal message-logging protocols, Distributed Computing, 15(1):1-15, February 2002
- Idit Keidar, Jeremy B. Sussman, Keith Marzullo, and Danny Dolev, Moshe: A group membership service for WANs, ACM Transactions on Computer Systems, 20(3): 191–238, February 2002.
- Dag Johansen D, Kåre Lauvset, and Keith Marzullo. An extensible software architecture for mobile components. Proceedings Ninth Annual IEEE International Conference and Workshop on the Engineering of Computer-Based Systems. IEEE Computer Society. 2002, pp. 231–237. Los Alamitos, CA, USA.
- Kåre Lauvset, Dag Johansen, and Keith Marzullo. Factoring mobile agents. Proceedings Ninth Annual IEEE International Conference and Workshop on the Engineering of Computer-Based Systems. IEEE Computer Society 2002, pp. 253–257. Los Alamitos, CA, USA.

=== 2003 ===
- Flavio Junqueira, Ranjita Bhagwan, Keith Marzullo, Geoff Voelker and Stefan Savage, The Phoenix recovery system: Rebuilding from the ashes of an Internet catastrophe. Proceedings of the Ninth Workshop on Hot Topics in Operating Systems, May 18–21, 2003, Lihue, HI
- Karan Bhatia, Keith Marzullo and Lorenzo Alvisi, Scalable causal message logging for wide-area environments. Concurrency and Computation: Practice and Experience, 2003
- Kjetil Jacobsen, Xianan Zhang and Keith Marzullo. Group Membership and Wide-Area Master Worker Computations. ICDCS 2003
- Flavio Junqueira and Keith Marzullo. Synchronous Consensus for Dependent Process Failures. ICDCS 2003
- Dmitrii Zagorodnov, Keith Marzullo, Lorenzo Alvisi and Thomas Bressoud. Engineering fault-tolerant TCP/IP services using FT-TCP. IEEE Dependable Computing and Communications Symposium (DSN-2003)
- Jeremy Sussman and Keith Marzullo. The Bancomat Problem: An Example of Resource Allocation in a Partitionable Asynchronous System. Journal of Theoretical Computer Science 291(1), January 2003.
