= Christopher Ahlberg =

Swedish computer scientist (born 1968)

- Born: September 1968 (age 57); Kungälv, Sweden
- Citizenship: American
- Education: Chalmers University of Technology
- Known for: Spotfire, Recorded Future
- Awards: MIT TR100
- Scientific career
- Fields: Computer Science, Human-Computer Interaction, Information Visualization, Entrepreneurship

Christopher Ahlberg (born September 1968) is a Swedish/American computer scientist and executive. Ahlberg is the co-founder and CEO of Recorded Future, now part of Mastercard, as well as Chair of the Board of Trustees of Hult International Business School.

== Career ==
Before co-founding Recorded Future, Ahlberg was the president of the Spotfire Division of Tibco, which he founded as an independent company in 1996. In 2007, Spotfire was acquired by Tibco for US$195 million in cash. Spotfire was founded based on his research on information visualization at the University of Maryland under the guidance of Ben Shneiderman. Ahlberg founded his second company, Recorded Future, in 2009. In 2019, he sold a majority stake in the company for US$780 million to Insight Partners, and in 2024 the company was acquired by Mastercard for $2.65 Billion, with Ahlberg retaining his position as its CEO.

Ahlberg earned his doctorate from Chalmers University of Technology with a thesis titled Dynamic queries, and has worked as a visiting researcher at the University of Maryland.

The US Patent Office has granted issuances to several of Ahlberg's applications for patents, primarily in software. He was named among the World's Top 100 Young Innovators by MIT Technology Review and received the TR100 award in 2002. Ahlberg is also a member of the Royal Swedish Academy of Engineering Sciences.
