= Paul Resnick =

American computer scientist

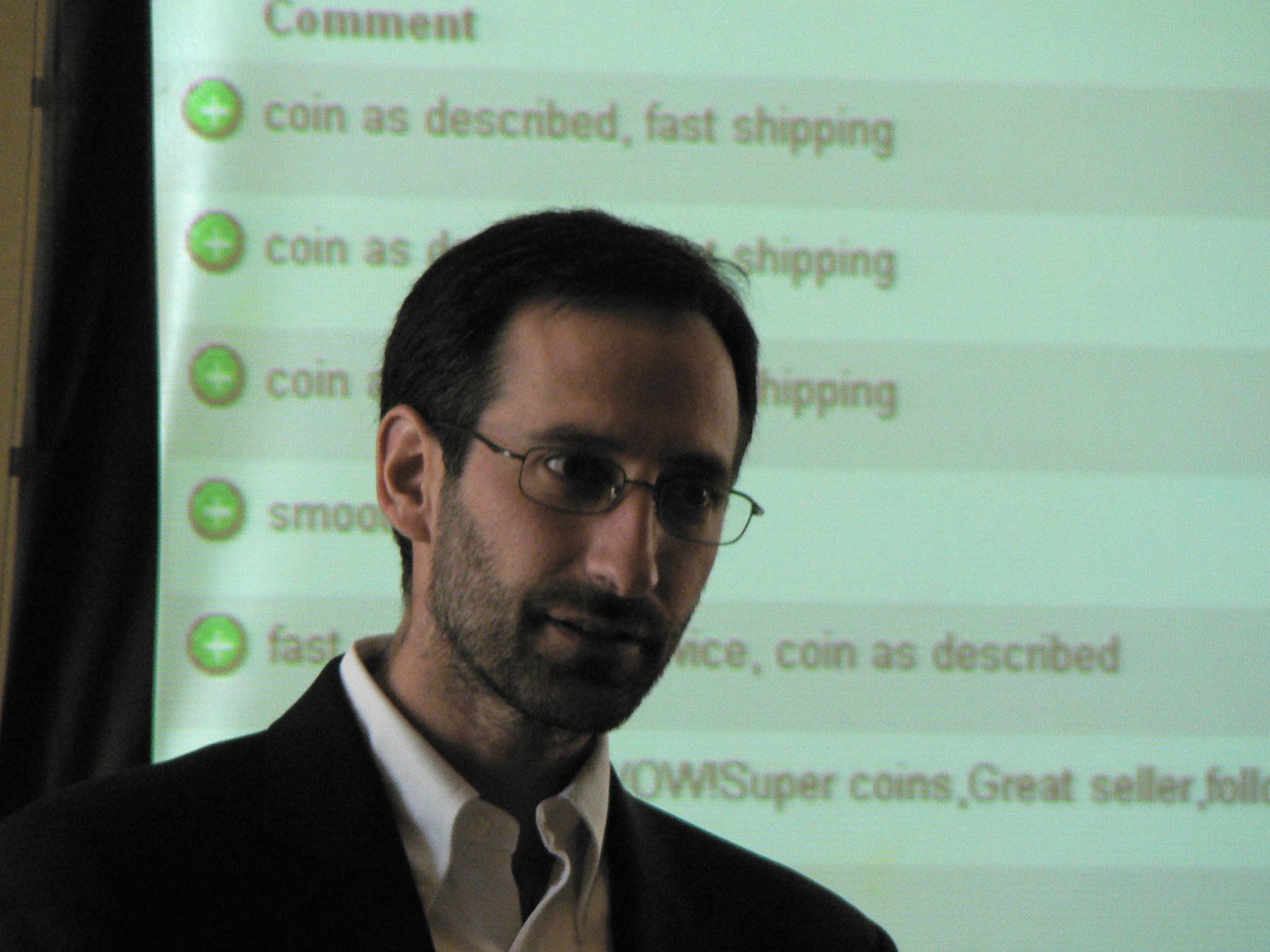
- Paul Resnick at Cornell/Microsoft Research International Symposium on Self-Organizing Online Communities
- Born: Paul Resnick; Michigan, U.S.
- Education: Massachusetts Institute of Technology; University of Michigan
- Known for: Recommender systems
- Awards: 2010 ACM Software Systems Award; 2016 University of Michigan Distinguished Faculty Achievement Award; ACM Special Interest Group on E-commerce Test of Time Award for the paper titled "The Social Cost of Cheap Pseudonyms."
- Scientific career
- Fields: Recommender systems; Reputation system; Online community; Human-computer interaction
- Workplaces: University of Michigan; School of Information
- Thesis: Hypervoice: Groupware by Telephone (1992)
- Doctoral advisor: Thomas W. Malone
- Doctoral students: Cliff Lampe

Paul Resnick is Michael D. Cohen Collegiate Professor of Information at the School of Information at the University of Michigan.

== Education ==
Paul Resnick was born in New York and attended the University of Michigan for his undergraduate studies. He received a Ph.D. at the Massachusetts Institute of Technology (MIT) in 1992 in Computer Science. After graduating from MIT, Resnick worked at AT&T Labs and AT&T Bell Labs and was an assistant professor at the MIT Sloan School of Management. He became an assistant professor at the University of Michigan in 1997, and subsequently became associate professor, professor, and then associate dean.

== Awards ==
Resnick was elected to the CHI Academy in 2017. He received the 2010 ACM Software Systems Award for his work on the GroupLens Collaborative Filtering Recommender System which showed how distributed users could personalize recommendations via ratings. He also received the ACM Special Interest Group on E-commerce Test of Time Award for the paper titled "The Social Cost of Cheap Pseudonyms". He received the 2016 University of Michigan Distinguished Faculty Achievement Award. In 2020, he was selected as Fellow of the Association for Computing Machinery (ACM) for contributions to recommender systems, economics and computation, and online communities.

== Selected works ==
- 2013. Building Successful Online Communities: Evidence-Based Social Design (with Bob Kraut)
- 1994. GroupLens: an open architecture for collaborative filtering of netnews
- 1997. Recommender systems (with Hal Varian)
- 2001. The social cost of cheap pseudonyms
