= Bongshin Lee =

South Korean computer scientist

- Education: Yonsei University; University of Maryland
- Scientific career
- Fields: Computer science
- Institutions: Microsoft Research; Yonsei University
- Thesis: Interactive Visualizations for Trees and Graphs (2006)
- Doctoral advisor: Ben Bederson
- Other academic advisors: Yoon-Chul Choy

Korean name
- Hangul: 이봉신
- RR: I Bongsin
- MR: I Pongsin
- Website: bongshiny.com

Bongshin Lee (Korean: 이봉신) is a computer scientist whose research concerns information visualization, human–computer interaction, the quantified self, and the automated conversion of sketches into data visualizations. She was educated in and has worked in both South Korea and the US; she is a professor at Yonsei University in South Korea.

== Education and career ==
Lee studied computer science at Yonsei University in Seoul. She earned a bachelor's degree magna cum laude in 1996, and a master's degree in 1998, advised by Yoon-Chul Choy. After two years as a software engineer in South Korea, she went to the University of Maryland, College Park for continued study in computer science, earning a second master's degree in 2002 and completing her Ph.D. in 2006. Her dissertation, Interactive Visualizations for Trees and Graphs, was supervised by Ben Bederson.

She joined Microsoft Research in 2006, and was a senior principal researcher there from 2019 to 2024, when she returned to Yonsei University as a professor in the Department of Computer Science and Engineering.

== Recognition ==
Lee was named to the IEEE Visualization Academy in 2020 and became an ACM Distinguished Member in 2025.
