= IEEE-USA Award for Distinguished Contributions Furthering Public Understanding of the Profession =

Engineering award

Created by the IEEE-USA, the IEEE-USA Award for Distinguished Contributions Furthering Public Understanding of the Profession '"recognize[s] outstanding journalistic or other efforts that lead to a better public understanding of the contributions of engineering professionals to the enhancement and expansion of the social, economic, and cultural aspects of life." The award is presented annually by IEEE-USA.

== Previous winners ==
=== 2000 ===
Jon Katz (Montclair, N.J., Wired, Rolling Stone and Slashdot.org): For his book, Geeks: How Two Lost Boys Rode the Internet out of Idaho.

=== 2001 ===
Stuart Brown: for his articles Big Jobs are going to Micromachines, and Good-Bye Test Tubes, Hello, Labs-on-a-Chip.

David Kestenbaum: for his National Public Radio features, including The Birth of Digital.

=== 2002 ===
Ben W. Stearns: for his book, Arthur Collins: Radio Wizard.

=== 2003 ===
William S. Hammack: for creating public understanding of engineering, science and technology through his weekly public radio series, Engineering and Life.

Ben Shneiderman: “for his book, Leonardo’s Laptop: Human Needs and the New Computing Technologies.”

=== 2004 ===
William J. Mitchell: for increasing public understanding of information technology in everyday life through his book, Me++: The Cyborg Self and the Networked City

Terri Spitz, Steven Cooper and Scott Schroeder:for increasing public understanding of the impacts on engineering employment due to the H-1B and L-1 visa programs through their TV news series, Stolen Jobs.

=== 2005 ===
C. Stewart Gillmor: for his biography, Fred Terman at Stanford, illustrating the importance of electrical and electronics engineering, and the contributions the engineer.

=== 2006 ===
WESH-TV Channel 2 News team consisting of Dan Billow, Travis J. Sherwin, Tom Schaad and Claire Metz: for accurate reporting in the Return to Flight series, which improved community awareness and understanding of the contributions of engineers in the space program.

Paula S. Apsell: For long-term efforts in promoting the understanding of science and engineering through NOVA programs.
