= Niklas Elmqvist =

American computer scientist

- Born: Sweden
- Education: Chalmers University of Technology
- Scientific career
- Fields: Human–computer interaction, Data and information visualization, Visual analytics
- Institutions: Aarhus University; University of Maryland, College Park; Purdue University
- Academic advisors: Philippas Tsigas
- Website: www.cs.au.dk/~elm/

Niklas Elmqvist is a Swedish-American computer scientist. He is currently a professor in the Department of Computer Science at Aarhus University, and a Villium Investigator. He is the Director of the Center for Anytime Anywhere Analytics at Aarhus University, a research center on augmented reality and extended reality (AR/XR) for data visualization.

Previously, he was a professor in the College of Information Studies, an affiliate professor in the Computer Science Department, and an affiliate member of UMIACS (University of Maryland Institute for Advanced Computer Studies), all at the University of Maryland, College Park. Elmqvist served as director of the University of Maryland Human–Computer Interaction Lab from 2016 to 2021. Prior to joining UMD, he was a faculty member in the School of Electrical and Computer Engineering at Purdue University from 2008 to 2014.

== Recognition ==
In 2013, Elmqvist received a U.S. National Science Foundation CAREER Award. In 2018 he was named a Distinguished Scientist by the Association for Computing Machinery (ACM). In April 2023, he was named a Villum Investigator by the Villum Foundation in Denmark. In November 2023, he was named as an IEEE Fellow by the Institute of Electrical and Electronics Engineers. He was named as an ACM Fellow, in the 2024 class of fellows, "for contributions to ubiquitous, immersive, and human-centered AI technologies for data visualization".

== Education ==
Niklas Elmqvist completed his Doctor of Philosophy in computer science in 2006 at Chalmers University of Technology.

== Research ==
Niklas Elmqvist is known for his work on human–computer interaction, data and information visualization, and visual analytics.

His contributions are diverse and focused on innovative human-data interaction and open data infrastructures. Early work centered on multivariate data visualization, such as in the GraphDice or DataMeadow systems. In his 2009 paper "Hierarchical Aggregation for Information Visualization" he proposed a model for building, visualizing, and interacting with multiscale representations, guiding other researchers toward more scalable visualization techniques.

Niklas Elmqvist has developed new architectures that enable novel combinations of multiple devices (such as smartwatches and large displays) as well as thought-provoking new devices, such as the first olfactory data display. He has championed the design of open and standardized infrastructures that support meshing those devices into a coherent whole, with a series of prototypes such as Munin, PolyChrome, and, more recently, the promising Vistrates framework, that supports easily building cross-device and distributed visualization applications.

His research exemplifies fluid interaction in a diverse set of visualization topics, from graphs and time series to animation and games, and, more recently, sensory substitution mechanisms such as haptic technology and sonification to improve the accessibility of visualizations for users with visual impairments.

== Service ==
Elmqvist was a papers co-chair of the IEEE Computer Society IEEE Information Visualization (InfoVis) conference in 2016, 2017, and 2020. He was an associate editor of IEEE Transactions on Visualization and Computer Graphics from 2015 until 2020, being awarded the TVCG Best Associate Editor Award in 2016. He is currently on the editorial board for Information Visualization and International Journal of Human-Computer Studies.

== Books ==
- Designing the User Interface Pearson by Shneiderman, B., Plaisant, C., Cohen, M., Jacobs, S., Elmqvist, N., Diakopoulos, N. - 6th Edition (2016) ISBN 978-0-32153735-5.
