= Zumobi =

Mobile technology company

Zumobi, Inc.
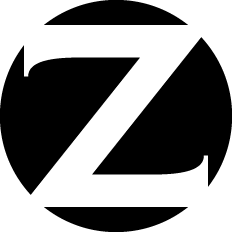
- Industry: Mobile media & advertising
- Predecessor: ZenZui
- Founded: September 2006
- Founder: Ben Bederson
- Defunct: October 2019
- Fate: Bankruptcy
- Headquarters: Seattle, WA, United States
- Number of locations: 3; New York City, Chicago & Seattle
- Area served: Worldwide

Zumobi, Inc. was a mobile technology company that partnered with multiple brands to create sponsored content for smartphones, tablets, and other devices. Zumobi's portfolio of mobile applications comprised The Zumobi Network: a premium mobile app network with properties in categories such as news, sports, lifestyle women's, and entertainment.

== History ==
Founded in September 2006, and announced officially at CTIA in the end of March 2007, Zumobi is an independent company spun out of Microsoft Research via the Microsoft IP Ventures group. Its three founders are John SanGiovanni, Dr. Ben Bederson and Jim Cooley. The current CEO is Ken Willner.

As a co-publishing partner, Zumobi works with media companies such as NBCNews.com, MSN, Bonnier Corporation, Source Interlink, Sporting News and Hearst Digital Media. Zumobi publishes apps using its proprietary platform that offers customization, social networking interoperability, and adaption across multiple mobile operating systems, including Apple's iOS (iPhone, iPod touch and iPad), Android, BlackBerry, Palm's webOS, Windows Phone and the Amazon Kindle Fire.

Zumobi uses a proprietary advertising platform–the Zumobi Brand Integration (ZBi) platform–for monetization opportunities through rich media advertising campaigns and sponsorships with specific, contextual placement in its apps. Past advertisers on The Zumobi Network include Ford, Mercedes-Benz, Unilever, Southwest Airlines, Geico, HP, Cisco, Mini Cooper, Best Buy, Chevrolet, and more.

Zumobi filed for Chapter 11 bankruptcy in October 2019. It was then slated to be acquired by the investment firm ESW Capital for $750,000.

== Sources ==
- "." Bloomberg BusinessWeek. Retrieved 18 April 2011.
- "." Fast Company. Retrieved 26 April 2011.
- Bass, Dina. "." Bloomberg BusinessWeek. Retrieved 26 April 2011.
- Belic, Dusan. "." IntoMobile. Retrieved 29 March 2011.
- Belic, Dusan. "." IntoMobile. Retrieved 18 April 2011.
- Ben-Aaron, Diana. "." Bloomberg BusinessWeek. Retrieved 26 April 2011.
- Cox, Gordon. "." Variety. Retrieved 26 April 2011.
- Duryee, Tricia. "." MocoNews.net. Retrieved 29 March 2011.
- Graham, Jefferson. "." USA Today. Retrieved 26 April 2011.
- Kaufman, Wendy. "." NPR. Retrieved 26 April 2011.
- Malik, Om. "." GigaOm. Retrieved 26 April 2011.
- Mccausland, Christianna. "." Fast Company. Retrieved 26 April 2011.
- Murray, Rheana. "." Mobile Marketer. Retrieved 29 March 2011.
- Plesser, Andy. "." Beet.tv. Retrieved 26 April 2011.
- Vocus PR-Web. "." The Street. Retrieved 29 March 2011.
- Walsh, Mark. "." MediaPost. Retrieved 29 March 2011.
