= Jen Golbeck =

American computer scientist

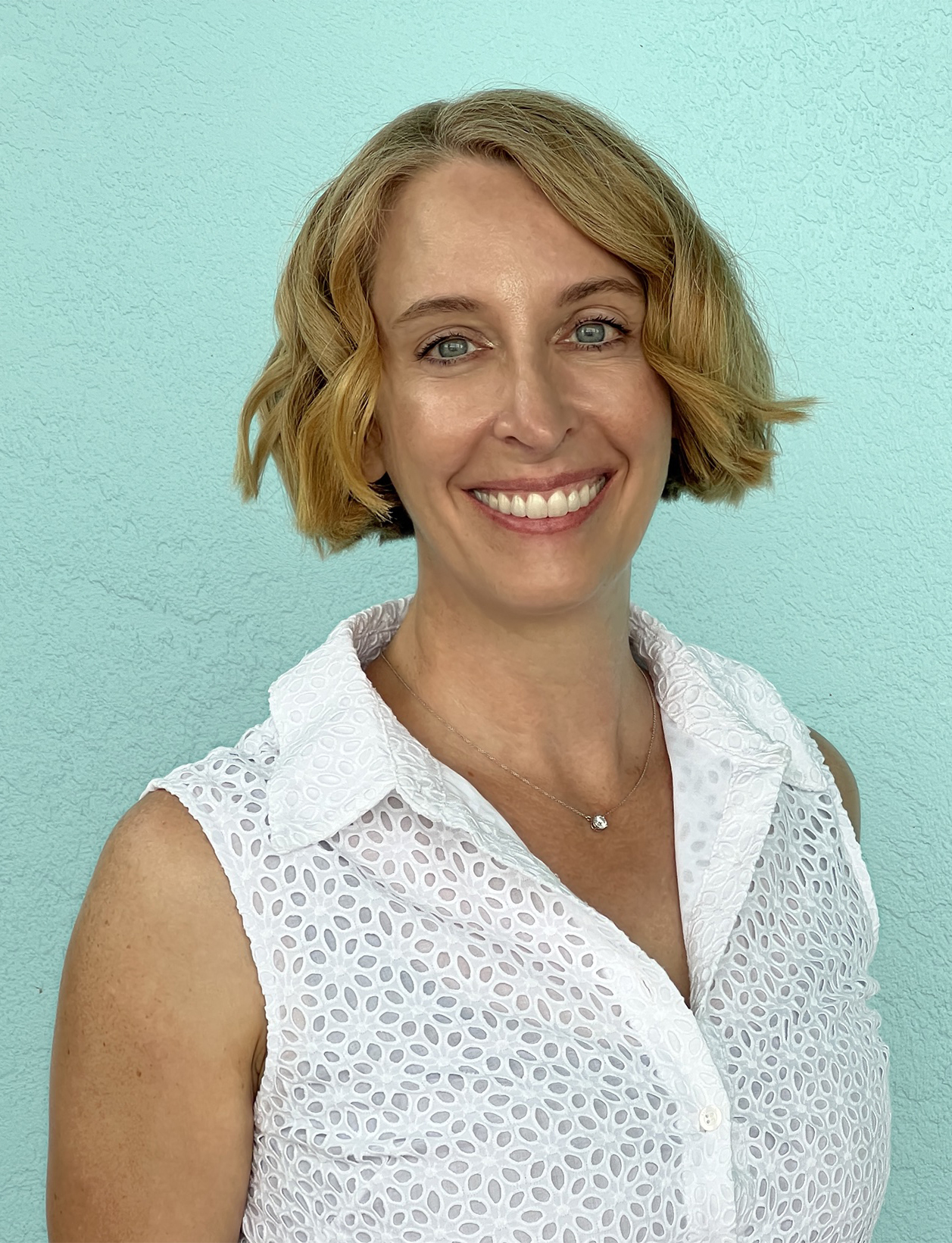
- Jennifer Golbeck
- Born: December 16, 1976 (age 49); Crystal Lake, Illinois
- Scientific career
- Workplaces: University of Maryland, College Park; University of Chicago; Harvard University
- Doctoral advisor: James Hendler
- Website: Jennifer Golbeck

Jennifer Golbeck is an American computer scientist and journalist. She is a professor at the College of Information, an affiliate professor in the Computer Science Department, and an affiliate professor in the Journalism Department, all at the University of Maryland, College Park. Golbeck was director of the University of Maryland Human–Computer Interaction Lab from 2011 to 2014.

== Education ==
Golbeck completed her Doctor of Philosophy in computer science from the University of Maryland, College Park. She also earned an SM and SB in Computer Science and an AB in Economics from the University of Chicago, and an MLA in Psychology from Harvard University.

== Career ==
=== Research ===
Golbeck works on computational social network analysis. She developed methods for inferring information about relationships and people in social networks and did early research on trust-based recommender systems. She was a program co-chair of ACM RecSys 2015. and General Chair in 2022

Golbeck's work includes computing personality traits and political preferences of individuals based on their social network profiles. Her presentation at TEDxMidatlantic, discussing the need for new methods of educating users about how to protect their personal data, was selected as one of TED's 2014 Year in Ideas talks. She presented at TEDxGeorgetown, about pets on the internet.

=== Media and publications ===
Golbeck has written for Esquire, Slate, The Atlantic, the LA Times, Wired, HuffPost, and served as a guest host on the Kojo Nnamdi Show, a talk show on Washington, DC's NPR affiliate, WAMU.

She also works as a photojournalist, focused on news, political events, and demonstrations.

Golbeck co-authored The Purest Bond: Understanding the Human-Canine Connection with Stacey Colino. The book examines the psychology and science of people's connections with their dogs and debuted at #26 on the USA Today Bestseller List.

=== Books ===
- Think Like a Dog: How Positive Psychology can Help Your Dog Thrive Simon & Schuster 2026 ISBN 1668060736
- The Purest Bond with Stacey Colino Simon & Schuster 2023 ISBN 9781668007846
- Online Harassment (ed.) Springer (2018) ISBN 9783319785837
- Social Media Investigation Singress (2015) ISBN 0-12-801656-6
- Analyzing the Social Web Morgan Kaufmann (2013) ISBN 0-12-405531-1
- Computing with Social Trust (ed.) Springer (2008) ISBN 1-848-00355-2
- Trust on the World Wide Web: A Survey Now Publishers (2008) ISBN 1-601-98116-3
- Art Theory for Web Design Addison-Wesley (2005) ISBN 1-57-676142-8

== Awards and honors ==
- 2018: ACM Distinguished Member

== Personal life ==
Golbeck splits her time between Silver Spring, Maryland and the Florida Keys.

=== Podcasts ===
Podcasts produced by Golbeck include The Golden Ratio Podcast, Murders in Paradise, and Runs With Dogs.
