= Catherine Plaisant =

French American computer scientist

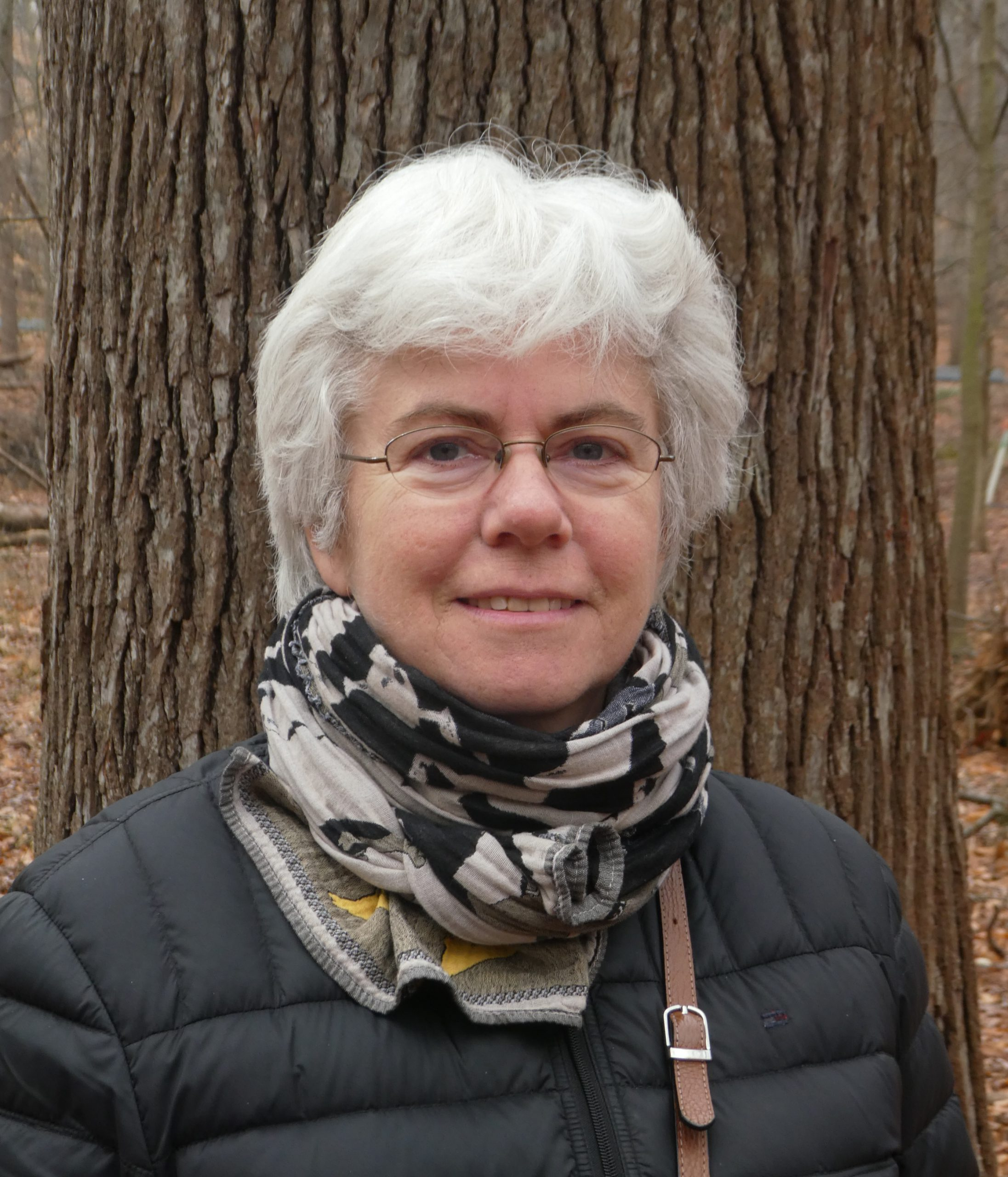
- Catherine Plaisant in 2020
- Born: May 26, 1957 (age 69); France
- Education: Pierre and Marie Curie University; Arts et Métiers ParisTech
- Awards: 2015 ACM CHI Academy; 2018 Inria International Chair; 2020 ACM SIGCHI Lifetime Service Award
- Scientific career
- Fields: Human–computer interaction, information visualization
- Workplaces: University of Maryland; Centre Mondial Informatique et Ressource Humaine (in French)
- Website: HCIL.UMD.edu/Catherine-Plaisant

Catherine Plaisant is a French/American Research Scientist Emerita at the University of Maryland, College Park and former assistant director of research of the University of Maryland Human–Computer Interaction Lab.

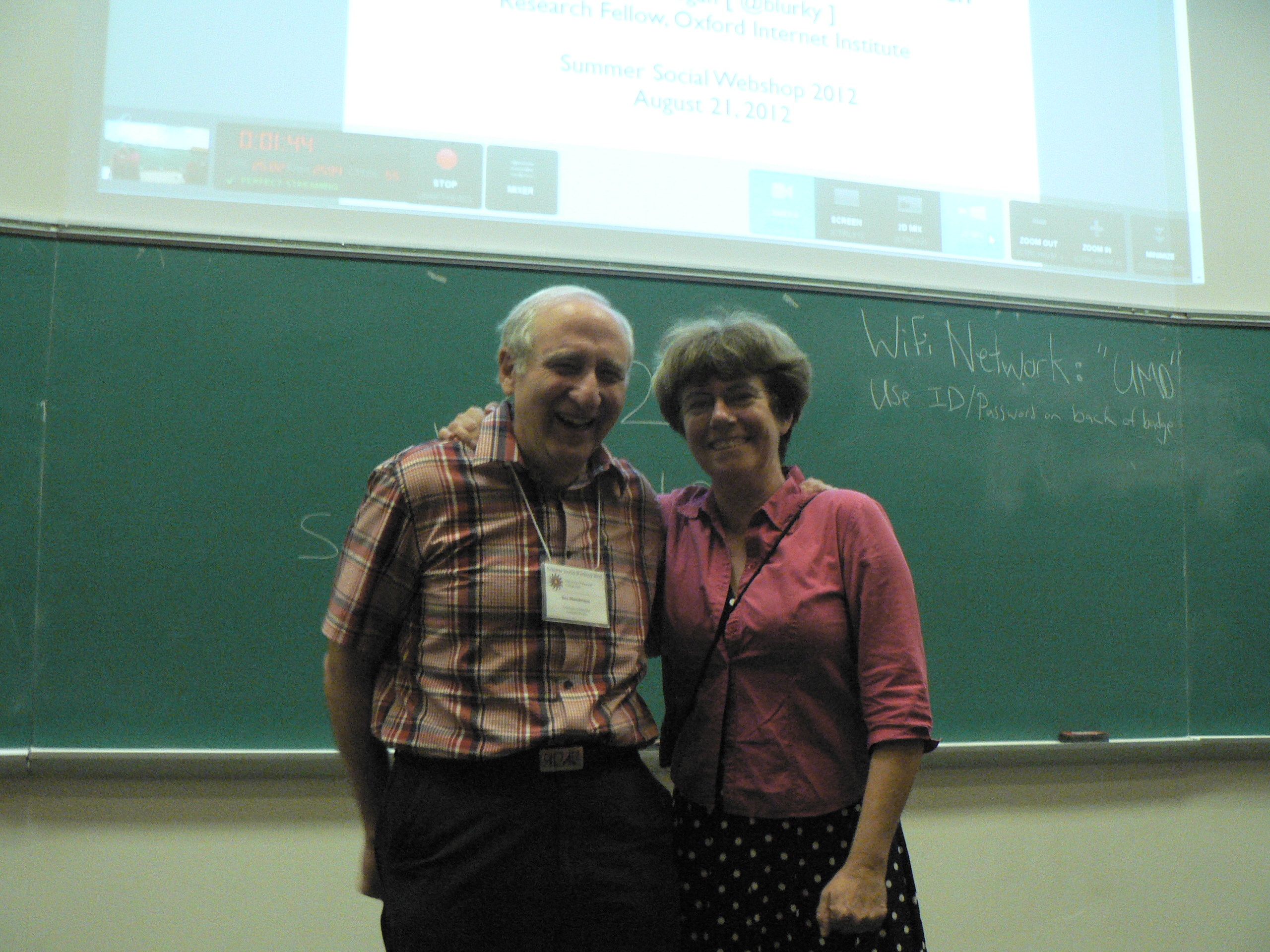
Ben Shneiderman and Catherine Plaisant at the Summer Social Webshop 2012, University of Maryland

== Education ==
Catherine Plaisant completed her Ph.D. in industrial engineering at Pierre and Marie Curie University in Paris, France. She also earned a Diplôme d'Ingénieur from Arts et Métiers ParisTech (one of the French Grandes écoles).

== Research ==
After five years working at the Centre Mondial Informatique et Ressource Humaine (in French) in Paris, Catherine Plaisant joined the University of Maryland Human–Computer Interaction Lab to work with Ben Shneiderman.

Catherine Plaisant is known for her work on human–computer interaction and information visualization. She contributed to the early development of touchscreen interfaces. For example, her work is cited in the lock screen (or "slide to unlock") patent litigation, which cites in particular her 1991 video of a touchscreen slider.

Plaisant also contributed to the development of Treemap (in particular Treemap 4.0) and Lifelines, a visualization of personal records, such as patient records. Other work has focused on visual analytics tools for exploring patterns of temporal event sequences, with projects such as LifeLines2 and EventFlow that enable analysts to find patterns in large databases of patient records, student records or customer records.

Catherine Plaisant was elected to the Association for Computing Machinery (ACM) CHI Academy in 2015, for her contributions to the field of study of human–computer interaction. Her work has been cited more than 32,000 times.

In 2018, Dr. Plaisant was awarded an INRIA (French: Institut national de recherche en informatique et en automatique) International Chair. The chairs are awarded to eminent international researchers to join its project teams. Plaisant's research project, for 2018–2022, Visual Analytics for Exploratory Data Analysis, is hosted by INRIA research team AVIZ (Analysis and Visualization).

In 2020 she received the SIGCHI Lifetime Service Award from the Association for Computing Machinery (ACM).

Later in 2020 Plaisant was recognized by the IEEE Computer Society with the 2020 Visualization Career Award "for her comprehensive body of work within the field of data visualization, including her contributions to evaluation, benchmarks, case studies, and her specific research focus on event sequence visualization."

== Books ==
- Designing the User Interface Pearson by Shneiderman, B. and Plaisant, C. - 4th Edition (2005), 5th Edition (2010), and 6th Edition (2016) ISBN 978-0-32153735-5.
