= Cliff Lampe =

American information scientist

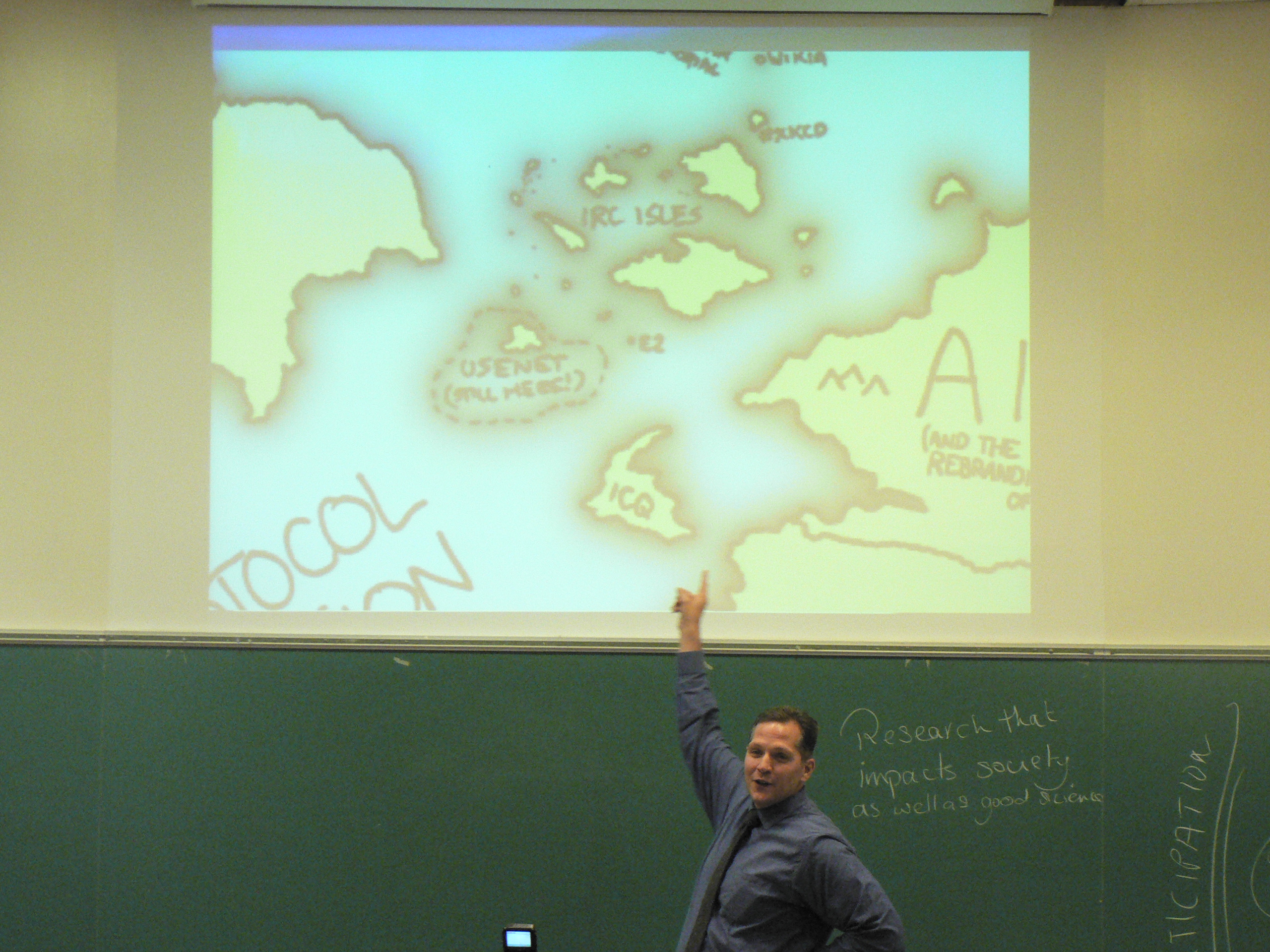
- Cliff Lampe pointing to the Internet as a Map at Webshop 2011
- Born: Clifford Lampe; Holland, Michigan, US
- Education: University of Michigan; Wayne State University
- Known for: Slashdot
- Awards: Vice President for Publications for ACM SIGCHI; Steering Committee Chair for CSCW
- Scientific career
- Fields: Social computing; Online communities; Human–computer interaction; Computer-supported cooperative work
- Workplaces: University of Michigan; School of Information
- Thesis: Ratings Use in an Online Discussion System: The Slashdot Case (2006)
- Doctoral advisor: Paul Resnick

Clifford Lampe is an American professor at the University of Michigan School of Information. He is best known for his research in the fields of human–computer interaction, social computing, and computer-supported cooperative work. Since 2018 he has been executive vice president for ACM SIGCHI. Lampe made foundational contributions in the areas of social networking sites, social capital, and online communities, work that has been cited over 34,000 times according to Google Scholar.

== Education ==
Cliff Lampe was born in Michigan and attended Kalamazoo College for his undergraduate studies. He received a PhD at the University of Michigan in 2006 in the School of Information where he was advised by Paul Resnick. His thesis examined the effects of comment ratings on site participation on the website Slashdot. After graduating from the University of Michigan, Lampe became an assistant professor at Michigan State University in the College of Communication Arts and Sciences.

== Research, teaching, and service ==
Lampe currently advises graduate and undergraduate students in the areas of online harassment, incivility online, and civic engagement online. He has developed a citizen interaction course that partners students with local communities to design technologies that support community needs. Lampe received a grant from the National Science Foundation in 2009 to pursue his work on "the role of social network sites in facilitating collaborative processes". He received a grant from the University of Michigan Third Century Initiative in 2013 to support his Citizen Interaction project.

He is a frequent consultant, speaker, and guest lecturer on topics related to social media and online behavior. He is regularly cited in the press on topics like fake news, privacy, and trolling. He was the technical program chair for the 2016 ACM SIGCHI Conference on Human Factors in Computing Systems and the general co-chair for the 2022 ACM SIGCHI Conference.

== Awards ==
In 2013, Lampe (with Eytan Adar and Paul Resnick) received a Google Award for his "MTogether: A Living Lab For Social Media Research" project.

In 2014, Lampe received the Joan Durrance Community Engagement Award for his Citizen Interaction Design program.

He was named as an ACM Fellow, in the 2024 class of fellows, "for contributions on social network systems, and outstanding leadership in the ACM SIGCHI community".

== Selected works ==
- 2007. "The benefits of Facebook "friends:" Social capital and college students' use of online social network sites". (with Nicole Ellison and Charles Steinfeld)
- 2008. "Social capital, self-esteem, and use of online social network sites: A longitudinal analysis". (with Charles Steinfeld and Nicole Ellison)
- 2004. "Slash (dot) and burn: distributed moderation in a large online conversation space". (with Paul Resnick)
