= Nathalie Henry Riche =

Information visualization researcher

Nathalie Henry Riche (also published as Nathalie Henry) is a computer scientist whose research involves information visualization, including the visualization of social networks and the use of visual narrative and immersion in data-driven visualization. Originally from France, and educated in Australia and France, she works in the US as a principal researcher for Microsoft Research, in the Extended Perception, Interaction & Cognition (EPIC) group.

== Education and career ==
After high school in Sens, Riche studied computer science at Paris-Sud University, earning a bachelor's degree in 2001. Next, she went to the Institut national des sciences appliquées, earning an engineering diploma and master's degree in computer science in 2004, as one of three women in a class of 300 students. She completed a Ph.D. in 2008, jointly through Paris-Sud University and the University of Sydney. Her dissertation, Exploring large social networks with matrix-based representations, was co-advised by Jean-Daniel Fekete and Peter Eades.

She joined Microsoft Research in 2008 as a postdoctoral researcher in a project in Orsay, France, later moving to Microsoft's Seattle research center.

== Recognition ==
Riche was named to the IEEE Visualization Academy in 2022.
