= Nicole Ellison =

American academic

- Born: Nicole Ellison; Los Angeles, California, United States
- Education: Barnard College; University of Southern California
- Awards: ICA Fellow (2019); ACM Distinguished Member (2024)
- Scientific career
- Fields: Computer-mediated communication; Social media; Social networking sites
- Workplaces: University of Michigan; School of Information
- Website: http://www-personal.umich.edu/~enicole

Nicole Ellison is the Karl E Weick Collegiate professor in the School of Information at the University of Michigan. She is best known for her research in the fields of computer-mediated communication, social media, and social networking sites. Her research has been cited over 83,000 times according to Google Scholar.

== Education ==
Nicole Ellison was born in Los Angeles and received her B.A. cum laude in English at Barnard College at Columbia University in 1990. She received her MA from the Annenberg School for Communication at the University of Southern California in 1998 and her PhD from there in 1999. She was a professor at Michigan State University before joining the School of Information at the University of Michigan. During the 2019–2020 academic year, Ellison was a fellow at the Center for Advanced Study in the Behavioral Sciences (CASBS) at Stanford University.

== Research, teaching, and service ==
Ellison has made foundational contributions in the areas of computer-mediated communication, mediated interpersonal interaction, self-presentation, use of social media in organizations, relationship initiation and maintenance in online contexts, and online dating sites. Her 2007 and 2013 articles on social network sites (with danah boyd) have over 23,000 citations. Her work on Facebook relationship maintenance has been cited by and adopted in a variety of scholarly articles, and she is frequently sought as a speaker, advisor, and collaborator in these areas. She received a grant from the National Science Foundation in 2009 to pursue her work on "the role of social network sites in facilitating collaborative processes". She also received a grant from the Bill & Melinda Gates Foundation and the College Knowledge Challenge group to explore the potential for social media to address college-going behaviors among low-income and first-generation college students.

She was named an International Communication Association Fellow in 2019. From 2016 to 2019, Ellison served as the Director of the Doctoral Program at the School of Information.

== Media ==
Ellison is frequently sought for expert commentary on social media. She has been quoted in mainstream news articles on popular social media sites like Facebook and Snapchat, on news and social media, and on relationships and social media.

== Selected works ==
- 2006. "Managing impressions online: Self‐presentation processes in the online dating environment". (with Rebecca Heino and Jennifer Gibbs)
- 2007. "Social network sites: Definition, history, and scholarship". (with danah boyd)
- 2008. "Social capital, self-esteem, and use of online social network sites: A longitudinal analysis". (with Charles Steinfeld and Cliff Lampe)
- 2007. "The benefits of Facebook "friends:" Social capital and college students’ use of online social network sites". (with Cliff Lampe and Charles Steinfeld)
- 2011. Connection strategies: Social capital implications of Facebook-enabled communication practices. (with Charles Steinfeld and Cliff Lampe)
- 2014. Cultivating Social Resources on Social Network Sites: Facebook Relationship Maintenance Behaviors and Their Role in Social Capital Processes. (with Jessica Vitak, Rebecca Gray, and Cliff Lampe)
