= Ike Nassi =

American computer scientist

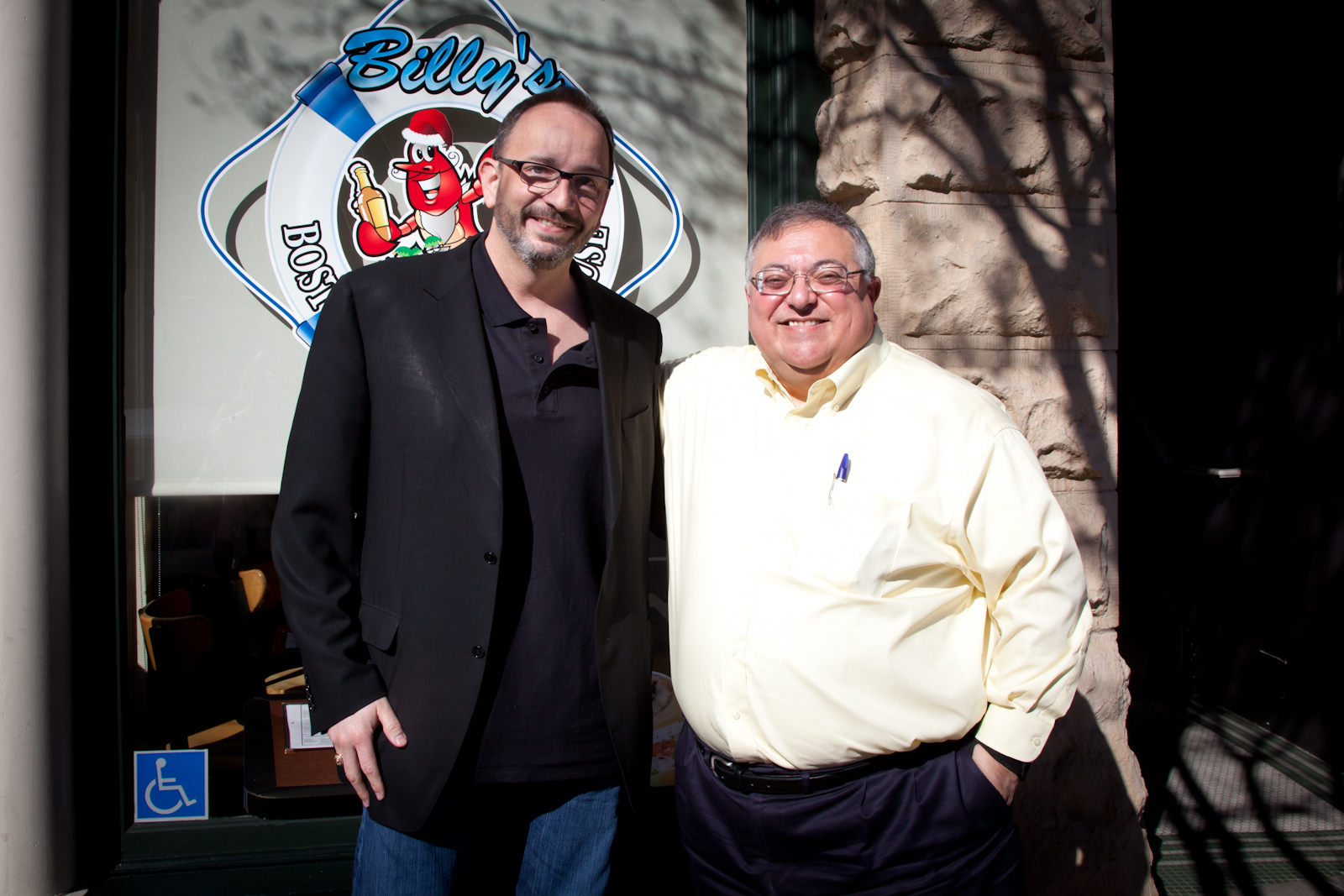
- Ike Nassi (on the right)
- Born: Isaac Nassi; February 24, 1949; Brooklyn, New York City, New York, US

Isaac Robert "Ike" Nassi (born 1949 in Brooklyn, New York) is the founder, and former CTO and chairman at TidalScale, Inc. before its acquisition by HPE, and an adjunct professor of computer science at the University of California, Santa Cruz. He is known for creating (with Ben Shneiderman) the highly influential Nassi–Shneiderman diagram notation. He also helped design the Ada programming language.

Ike is a Life Fellow of the IEEE, and a Senior Life Member of ACM.

== Early life ==
Ike is a graduate of Brooklyn Technical High School. He earned a bachelor's degree in mathematics, a master's degree and doctorate in Computer Science from Stony Brook University, New York, in 1974.

== Career ==
Ike was formerly EVP and Chief Scientist at SAP AG, and the practice lead of the SAP Research Technology Infrastructure practice, which was focused on guiding SAP's technology infrastructure vision, direction, and execution. His group was also responsible for the SAP Sponsored Academic Research Program.

Prior to his work at TidalScale and SAP, Ike helped start three companies: Firetide, InfoGear Technology, and Encore Computer. He co-founded the wireless mesh company Firetide and then served as its EVP, chief technology officer (CTO), and chairman of the board. Ike was the CTO and head of product operations at InfoGear prior to its acquisition by Cisco Systems. He helped start Encore Computer, a pioneer in symmetric multiprocessors and forerunner of today's multicore processors.

In addition to his start-up experience, Ike held an executive position at Cisco Systems following its acquisition of InfoGear Technology. He joined Apple Inc. to run the new Advanced Technology Group research lab in Cambridge, Massachusetts near MIT, work on the Dylan programming language intended for the Apple Newton, become VP of Development Tools in California, become SVP of Software, launch MkLinux, and become a Corporate Officer. He served on the boards of Taligent and the OpenDoc Foundation. He also held executive and senior management roles at Visual Technology (Tewkesbury, Massachusetts), Digital Equipment Corporation, and at SofTech.

Ike serves as an active member of the board of trustees of the Computer History Museum in Mountain View, California, and formerly served on the board of the Anita Borg Institute for Women and Technology. He is a member of the Industry Advisory Board of the IEEE Computer Society, and member of the Advisory Boards of Northwestern University, Stony Brook University, and Peking University. He has been a visiting scholar at Stanford University and U.C. Berkeley, and was most recently a visiting scientist at MIT. Nassi holds several patents and He was a member of the Defense Advanced Research Projects Agency's Information Systems and Technology group and has testified before Congress on the Emerging Telecommunications Act of 1991.

== Awards ==
Ike was awarded a Certificate for Distinguished Service in 1983 from the Department of Defense for his work on the design of the Ada programming language.
