= Jenny Preece =

American computer scientist

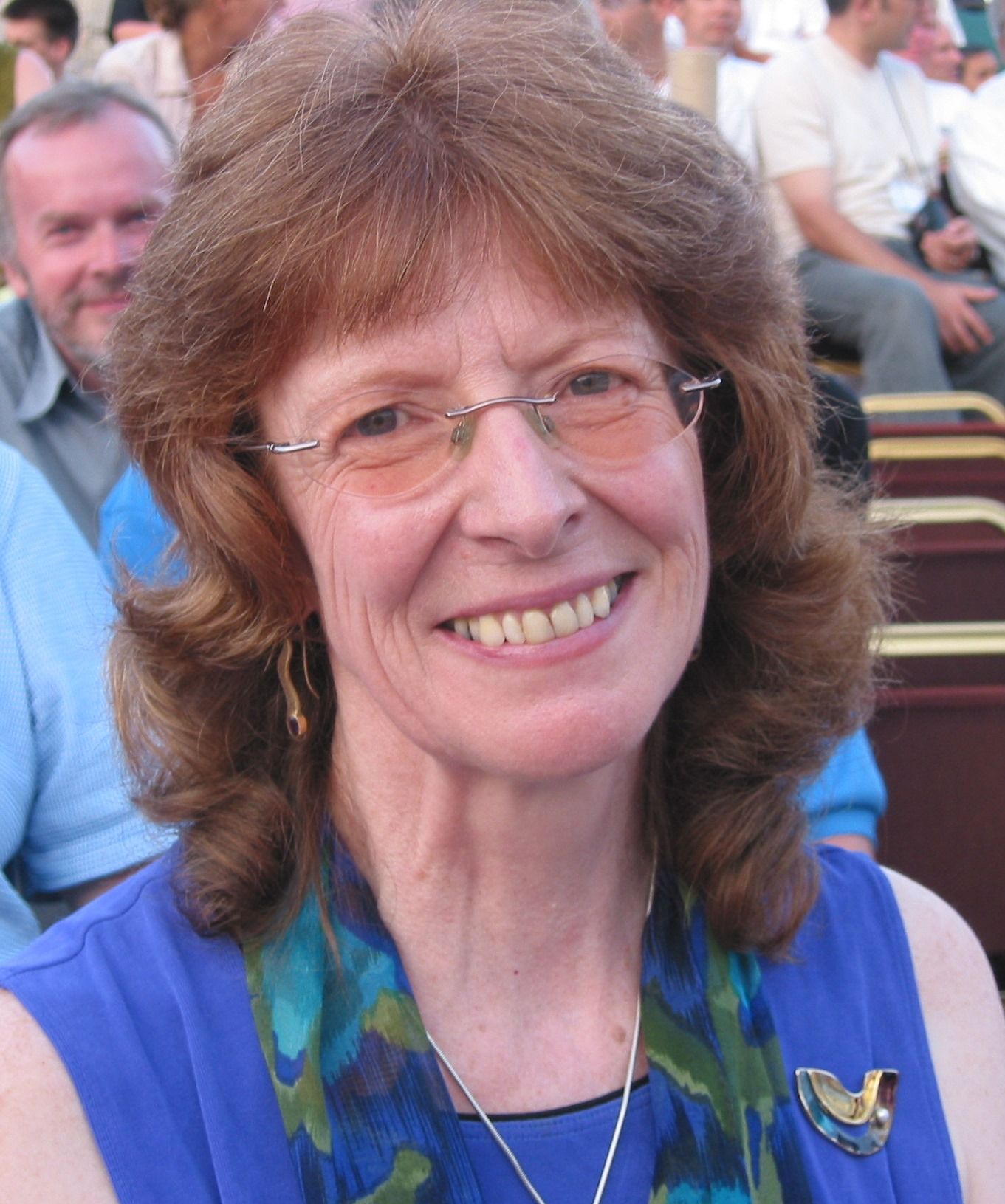
- Education: Open University
- Awards: ACM SIGCHI
- Scientific career
- Fields: Human–computer interaction, Computer-mediated communication, Citizen Science
- Workplaces: University of Maryland, College Park
- Doctoral advisor: Timothy O'Shea

Jenny Preece is an American academic who is the Dean Emerita (2005–2015) of the College of Information Studies, a Professor at the University of Maryland, and a member of the University of Maryland Human-Computer Interaction Lab. She researches online communities and is known for her work on what makes such a community successful, and how usability factors interact with sociability in online communities.

== Life and work ==
Preece gained her Ph.D. at the Open University, later becoming faculty there. She went on to be a Research Professor of Information Systems and founding Director of the Research Center for People and Systems Interaction at London South Bank University in London. At the University of Maryland, she has studied how online communities can stimulate and support social engagement. Her current work is on citizen science and environmental education. Her work is described in Encounters with HCI Pioneers: A Personal History and Photo Journal.

=== Publications ===
- Jennifer Preece, Yvonne Rogers & Helen Sharp: Interaction Design: Beyond Human-Computer Interaction, 2nd Edition (2007), John Wiley & Sons, ISBN 0-470-01866-6. 3rd Edition (2011), John Wiley & Sons, ISBN 9780470665763. 4th Edition (2014), John Wiley & Sons, ISBN 978-1-119-02075-2, 5th Edition (2019), John Wiley & Sons.
- Online Communities: Designing Usability, Supporting Sociability, John Wiley & Sons (2000) ISBN 0-471-80599-8
- Human-Computer Interaction co-author, with Yvonne Rogers, Helen Sharp, David Benyon, Simon Holland, and Tom Carey, (1994) ISBN 0-201-62769-8
- Jenny Preece, Blair Nonnecke, Dorine Andrews: The top five reasons for lurking: improving community experiences for everyone doi:10.1016/j.chb.2003.10.015

Preece has published papers on trust, community, and online etiquette, including the transition of readers and participants to community leaders. In 2011 she was selected to join the CHI Academy.
