= Allison Druin =

American computer scientist

Allison Druin is an American computer scientist who studies human–computer interaction, and digital libraries, particularly focusing on children's use of educational technology. She is a professor emerita at the University of Maryland, College Park and was Associate Provost for Research and Strategic Partnerships at the Pratt Institute. She is currently Head of School at the J. S. Bryant School in Massachusetts, which she co-founded.

== Education and career ==
Druin has a Bachelor of Fine Arts in graphic design from the Rhode Island School of Design (1985). She earned a master's degree in 1987 from the MIT Media Lab at the Massachusetts Institute of Technology, and completed a Ph.D. in 1997 at the College of Education at the University of New Mexico. Her dissertation was A Multidisciplinary Education for Designing Interactive Applications: The MEDIA Program, and was supervised by Priscilla Norton.

She joined the College of Information Studies at the University of Maryland, College Park as a research assistant professor in 1998, and became a regular-rank faculty member in 1999. From 2006 to 2011 she directed the Human-Computer Interaction Lab at the university, from 2010 to 2012 she was Associate Dean for Research, from 2011 to 2013 she was ADVANCE Professor, and from 2013 to 2015 she was chief futurist for the university. She took a leave from Maryland to work for two years as Special Advisor for National Digital Strategy to the US National Park Service, before joining the Pratt Institute as Associate Provost in 2017.

== Books ==
Druin is the author or editor of:

- Children’s Internet Search: Using Roles to Understand Children’s Search Behavior (with Elizabeth Foss, Morgan & Claypool, 2014)
- Methods and Techniques for Involving Children in the Design of New Technology for Children (with Jerry Alan Fails and Mona Leigh Guha, Now Publishers, 2013)
- Mobile Technology for Children: Designing for Interaction and Learning (ed., Morgan Kauffman, 2009)
- Robots for Kids: Exploring New Technologies for Learning (ed. with James Hendler, Morgan Kaufmann, 2000)
- The Design of Children's Technology (ed., Morgan Kaufmann, 1999)
- Designing Multimedia Environments for Children (with Cynthia Solomon, Wiley, 1996)

== Awards and honors ==
Druin and Ben Bederson won the ACM SIGCHI Social Impact Award in 2010, for developing the International Children's Digital Library. In 2014, Druin became an ACM Distinguished Member. Druin was elected as a Fellow of the Association for Computing Machinery in 2016, "for contributions to creating information and computing technologies with and for children". In the same year she was elected to the CHI Academy.
