= Spotfire =

Analytics platform

- Industry: Computer software
- Products: Spotfire
- Website: spotfire.com

TIBCO Spotfire is an American artificial intelligence (AI)-based analytics platform. Before being acquired by TIBCO in 2007, Spotfire was a business intelligence company based in Somerville, Massachusetts.

== History ==
Spotfire was co-founded by Christopher Ahlberg, who later was chief executive officer, in 1996. Ben Shneiderman's work on information visualization, including dynamic queries, also led to the development of Spotfire.

Ahlberg returned to Sweden and developed an enhanced UNIX implementation of his visual data analysis tool, the Information Visualization and Exploration Environment (IVEE).

Spotfire was launched in mid-1996 by IVEE Development, which was renamed Spotfire Inc.

TIBCO bought the company in 2007 for $190 million. In November 2011, TIBCO added business intelligence (BI) and analytics software Spotfire 4.0 with Microsoft SharePoint integration.

Spotfire X was released in 2018 and introduced new AI and natural language processing capabilities. The launch of Spotfire 11 in 2020 featured Hyperconverged Analytics, which has been described as "the confluence of visual analytics, data science and streaming data capture in one environment". Spotfire 12, released in 2022, allowed customers to complete data-driven actions from dashboards and added new cloud-native and model operations functions.

Spotfire became a business unit of Cloud Software Group in 2023. The company has become an AI-powered data analytics and visualization platform. In 2023, TIBO updated Spotfire 12.2 with improved data visualization features and new data functionality. Built on Microsoft Azure's OpenAI service, the AI assistant Spotfire Copilot was introduced to improve data analysis functions.

== See also ==
- Business intelligence software
- Artificial intelligence
- Data science
- Machine learning
