= Idit Keidar =

Israeli electrical engineer

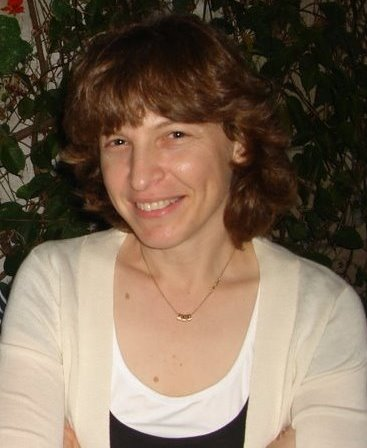
Idit Keidar

Idit Keidar (Hebrew: עדית קידר) is a professor of electrical engineering and an author of more than 180 articles which gave her an h-index of 38 and were cited more than 5,000 times. Some of them were published in such journals as Journal of Parallel and Distributed Computing and SIAM Journal on Computing.
