= Ben Bederson =

American computer scientist

Benjamin B. Bederson
- Education: New York University; Rensselaer Polytechnic Institute
- Known for: Zooming User Interface, Human Computation, Digital Libraries
- Awards: ACM Distinguished Scientist, CHI Academy, SIGCHI Social Impact Award
- Scientific career
- Fields: Computer Science, Human-Computer Interaction
- Workplaces: University of Maryland, College Park (1998–Present); University of New Mexico (1995–1997)
- Doctoral students: Bongshin Lee

Benjamin Bederson is a Computer Science professor at the University of Maryland, College Park, a member of the University of Maryland Human-Computer Interaction Lab, and a co-founder of Zumobi.

His father was Benjamin Bederson, Sr., a Professor of Physics Emeritus, New York University.

== Biography ==
Ben Bederson received a B.S. in Computer Science from Rensselaer Polytechnic Institute in 1986. Bederson received his M.S. and Ph.D. in Computer Science in 1987 and 1992 from New York University where he researched Zooming User Interface.

Bederson became inducted into the Association for Computing Machinery's CHI Academy as a Distinguished Scientist in 2012 and became an ACM Distinguished Scientist in 2011. In 2010 he and Allison Druin won the SIGCHI Social Impact Award for developing the International Children's Digital Library.

Bederson was an expert witness for Samsung in Apple Inc. v. Samsung Electronics Co., Ltd. to discuss prior art.

== Selected publications ==
- 2008. Voting Technology and the Not-So-Simple Act of Casting a Ballot; with Herrnson, P.S., Niemi, R.G., Hanmer, M.J., Conrad, F.G., Traugott, M.; Brookings Institution Press.
