= University of Maryland College of Information =

School within the University of Maryland, College Park, Maryland, US

College of Information
- Other name: INFO College
- Former names: The School of Library and Information Services (1965), College of Library and Information Services (1973), College of Information Studies (2001)
- Motto: Connecting People, Information and Technology for Good
- Type: Public
- Established: 1965
- Founder: Paul Wasserman
- Parent institution: University of Maryland, College Park
- Affiliations: https://www.ischools.org/
- Dean: John Bertot
- Location: College Park, Maryland, 20742, United States; 38°59′17.4″N 76°56′29.4″W
- Campus: suburban
- Language: English
- Website: info.umd.edu

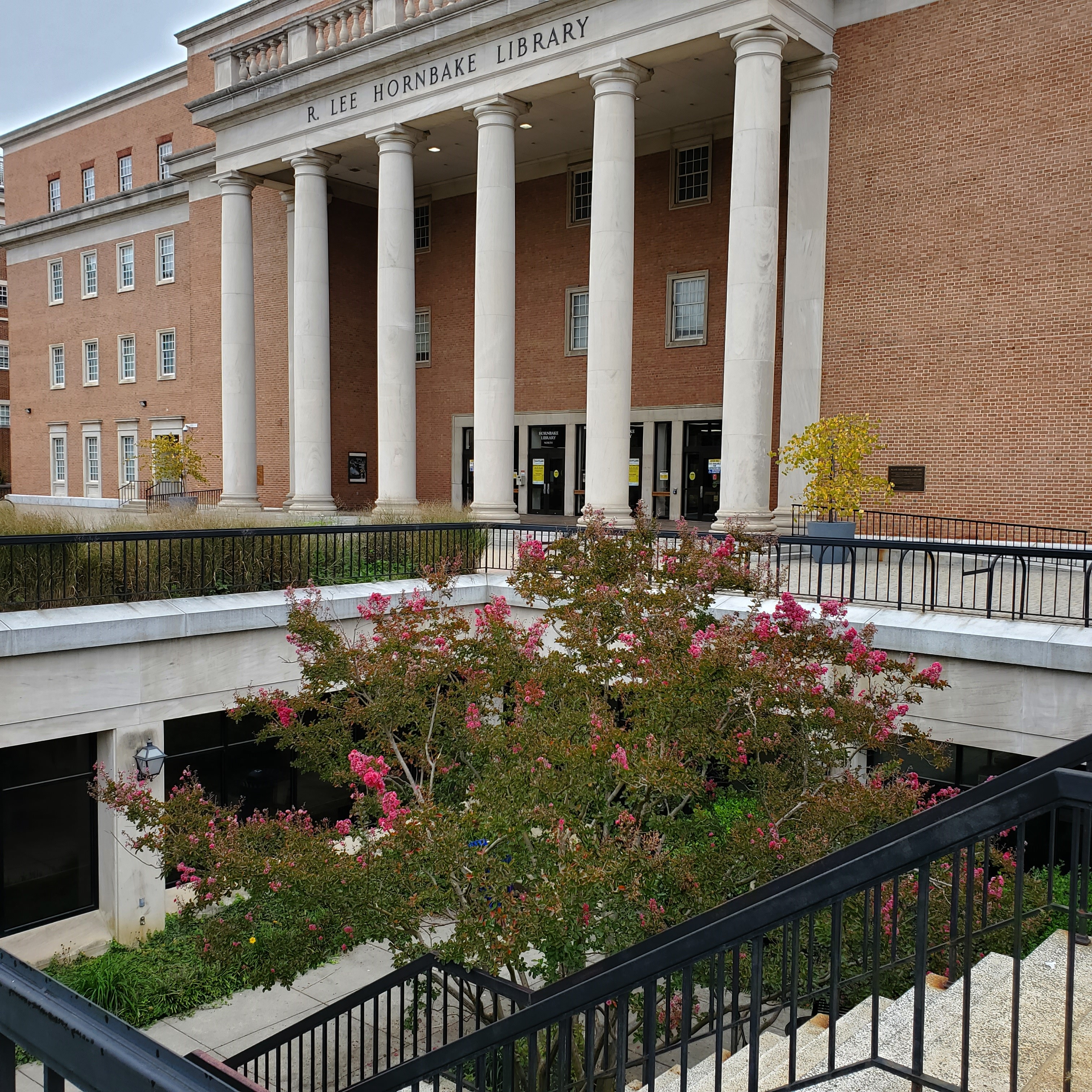
Hornbake Library at the University of Maryland, home to the College of Information

The College of Information is the information school of the University of Maryland, College Park.

== History ==
=== Founding 1965 ===
The College of Information was founded in 1965 at the University of Maryland (UMD) in response to demand for library education in the DC/MD/VA area, which lacked a library school in a public university at that time. Originally named the School of Library and Information Services, the school's first home was in the University's McKeldin Library and it offered a Master of Library Science (MSL) degree program.

Paul Wasserman was the school's first Dean, bringing with him extensive experience as an educator and librarian, with notable appointments at the Brooklyn Public Library, NY 1949-53 and Cornell University, Graduate School of Business and Public Administration 1953-65. Wasserman, who served as Dean for five years, was known for his advocacy of research and innovation in the field of information science. Under his leadership, the school became the first Information School to require a technology course, began recruiting international faculty and students, became accredited by the American Library Association in 1967 (which the college maintains today), established the controversial High John Library in 1967, and launched a PhD in Information Studies program in 1969.

In 1970, the school moved to UMD's new Undergraduate Library, which was later named for R. Lee Hornbake, the University Vice President and VP for Academic Affairs, a strong supporter of library education and services. In 1973, the school was renamed the College of Library and Information Services.

=== Challenge of 1991 ===
In the 1980s there was heated debate over whether Library Schools should be a part of major research-oriented universities. The University of Chicago's Graduate Library School was closed in 1989 and its closing was attributed to "the divorce of the School's research activities from what the profession perceived as its needs for training." Shortly thereafter, in 1990, Columbia University's School of Library Service was closed. There were reports of fierce opposition from tenured faculty to sever ties to all library communities and reorient priorities to support newly emerging information communities as well as deemphasize professionally relevant education and practitioner connections. In 1991, coupled with the economic downturn (the University had implemented furloughs as well) there was a call for the College of Library and Information Services at Maryland to be shut down. It was proposed that the college became a department rather than a self-standing college. There was a public, open meeting where the issue was debated. The college was given support by Representative Steny Hoyer. In addition, past deans, faculty and alumni were on hand to counter the proposal. Former students spoke up in defense of the program, attributing their successes in public service jobs to the college's educational programs. The college was able to avoid being shut down.

=== Transition Phase & Renaming 1993 - 2001 ===
In the 1990s, library schools, including the UMD College of Library and Information Services, began to expand their areas of research and education in response to the rapidly advancing information age. More and more information was being produced and being disseminated from ever-increasing sources. The college was expanding into data science and policy, digital literacy, and how the new world of information and technology could be leveraged to benefit individuals and social challenges.

In 1993, Ann Prentice became dean of the college. During this time period, the University of Maryland's Provost prompted a general review of the college and a reexamination of the goals and mission statement. The Provost wanted to promote more innovation, creation, research, and services. Therefore, the college went through significant changes as the MLS curriculum was revised and the college began to morph into what it is now, the College of Information.

In 2001, to reflect this evolution in its scope of academics and research, the school was renamed the College of Information Studies. Dropping “libraries” and replacing “services” with “studies” was deliberate, and reflected both the broader scope of its research while still respecting its impact on practice and policy in libraries.

=== The 2000s Information Age Prompts Growth of the College ===
Bruce Dearstyne took over as Interim Dean in 2001 after Prentice retired, and the transformation continued under his leadership. His signature initiative was introduction of the Master of Information Management program (MIM) in 2003.

In 2005, Jenny Preece became Dean and served through 2015.

Under Preece, the MIM program grew substantially. In addition, in 2011, the Master of Human-Computer Interaction (HCIM) program was launched. The college was emerging as a leader in research and education in data science and human-computer interaction. In the summer of 2015, Brian Butler took over as interim dean as Jenny Preece stepped down, which coincided with the college's inaugural MLS program being renamed the Master of Library & Information Science (MLIS).

In 2016, Keith Marzullo accepted the position of Dean of the College of Information Studies and served two terms in this role through June 2025. Marzullo, a computer scientist, ACM Fellow, educator, and policy leader. During Marzullo's tenure, the college launched the:

- Bachelor of Science in Information Science degree program (InfoSci) in 2016,
- Dual Master Degree in Information Management and Community Planning (CPIM) in 2019 in collaboration with the UMD School of Architecture, Planning and Preservation,
- Master of Professional Studies in Game, Entertainment, and Media Analytics (GEM) in 2021,
- Master of Professional Studies in Data Journalism (MPDJ) in 2022 in collaboration with the UMD Philip Merrill College of Journalism,
- Bachelor of Science in Social Data Science (SDSC) in 2022 in collaboration with the UMD College of Behavioral and Social Sciences,
- and the Bachelor of Arts in Technology and Information Design (InfoDesign) in 2022.

In 2024, the Bachelor of Science in Information Science (InfoSci) program became the second largest degree program at the University of Maryland College Park.

As Dean, Marzullo continued the college's commitment to its membership in the iSchools Organization, becoming the iSchools Americas Chair in 2018, representing Canada, the United States, Central America, and South America. Under Marzullo, in 2024, the college changed its name to the College of Information.

During this new age of growth, students within the College of Information are encouraged to embody a new motto: "I Am INFO: Technically savvy. Socially aware. Ethically grounded." This is to emphasize the idea that INFO is more than a major at UMD, it is mindset and shared mission.

=== 2025 Growth Amid New Landscapes ===
In July 2025, Douglas W. Oard was appointed the interim dean of the College of Information. As a renowned expert in information retrieval, Oard had been instrumental in advancing the college’s research and academic mission since joining the college in 1996. As interim dean, Oard guided the college through a period of continued rapid growth of the college's student body alongside a quickly shifting landscape of federal and state funding. Oard dedicating his time in this role to innovation and building a strong foundation for the college.

=== 2026 Charting a People-Centered Future ===
In July 2026, John Bertot was appointed dean of the College of Information. A professor, researcher, and university leader with nearly two decades of service to UMD, Bertot returns to the college he first joined in 2008 with a vision rooted in people, impact, and service. His goals for the next decade are ambitious and practical: a well-funded college with deep community partnerships across industry, nonprofits, libraries, cultural institutions, and government, and students who leave prepared not just with technical skills, but with the ability to create meaningful change. As technology reshapes the workforce, Bertot sees INFO’s long-standing focus on people as a source of enduring strength. Technical skills matter, but INFO students also learn to understand data, systems, and the human contexts in which they operate—an approach he sees as increasingly valuable, not less.

== Deans ==
- Paul Wasserman: 1965-1970
- Michael Reynolds (interim): 1970
- James Liesener (interim): 1970-1971
- Margaret Chisholm: 1971-1975
- Henry Duebster (interim)
- Keith Wright: 1977-1980
- Michael Reynolds (interim)
- Anne MacLeod (interim)
- Claude Walston: 1983-1992
- Ann Prentice: 1993-2001
- Bruce Dearstyne (interim): 2001-2005
- Charles Lowry (interim): 2005
- Jenny Preece: 2005-2015
- Brian Butler (interim): 2015-2016
- Keith Marzullo: 2016-2025
- Douglas W. Oard (interim): 2025-2026
- John Bertot: 2026-current

== Degree Programs & Launch Dates ==
- Master of Library & Information Science: 1965
- Doctor of Philosophy in Information Studies: 1969
- Dual Master of Arts in History and Library & Information Science: 1979
- Master of Information Management: 2003
- Master of Science in Human-Computer Interaction: 2011
- Bachelor of Science in Information Science at College Park: 2016
- Bachelor of Science in Information Science at Shady Grove: 2018
- Dual Master Degree in Information Management and Community Planning: 2019
- Master of Professional Studies in Game, Entertainment, and Media Analytics: 2021
- Master of Professional Studies in Data Journalism: 2022
- Bachelor of Arts in Technology and Information Design: 2022
- Bachelor of Science in Social Data Science: 2022
- Doctor of Information Science in Information Science Leadership and Community Engagement: 2026

== Name Changes ==
- The School of Library and Information Services (1965)
- College of Library and Information Services (1973)
- College of Information Studies (2001)
- College of Information (2024)
