= University of Michigan School of Information =

American school of information science

- Former names: University of Michigan Department of Library Science (1926–1969); School of Library Science (1969–1986); School of Information and Library Studies (1986–1996)
- Type: Public
- Established: 1926; 100 years ago
- Parent institution: University of Michigan
- Dean: Andrea Forte
- Faculty: 111
- Students: 1199
- Location: Ann Arbor, Michigan, USA
- Campus: Urban
- Website: si.umich.edu

The University of Michigan School of Information (UMSI or iSchool) is the information school of the University of Michigan, a public research university in Ann Arbor, Michigan. It offers baccalaureate, magisterial, and doctoral degrees.

The School of Information is part of a growing list of i-schools devoted to the study of information as a discipline. These institutions have varied histories, some being newly created, others developing from earlier schools or departments focused on library and information science (as with SI), computer science, communications, or information technology. SI was the first of these institutions to relabel itself as a "school of information." It is currently housed in the Leinweber Computer Science and Information Building on the University of Michigan's Ann Arbor campus.

== History ==
The University of Michigan Department of Library Science was founded in 1926. The first class of 34 students graduated with the degrees of Bachelor of Arts in Library Science (ABLS) in 1927. In 1969, the Department of Library Science became the School of Library Science. In 1986, the school was renamed the School of Information and Library Studies.

In 1992, the then-president of the University of Michigan, James Duderstadt, appointed Daniel E. Atkins III as the dean of the school. Under the direction of dean Atkins and with support from Duderstadt and W.K. Kellogg Foundation, the school became the School of Information in 1996 with the intent to reach beyond traditional library science arena, offering the degree program of Master of Science in Information with multiple specializations (library and information science, archives and record management, human computer interaction, information economics management and policy, and a tailored program).

== Academics ==
=== Undergraduate degree ===
In fall 2008, the University of Michigan started to offer the undergraduate major of informatics. The informatics major was housed in the College of Literature, Science, and the Arts in cooperation with the College of Engineering and the School of Information, offering students a solid grounding in information systems, statistics, mathematics and computer programming. Depending on the track chosen, students were prepared for many career paths, including business, research, government, computer programming, education and non-profit organizations.

In 2014, the School of Information began to offer an undergraduate degree, a Bachelor of Science in Information (BSI). This interdisciplinary degree focuses on the social/behavioral and technological sciences. High school students may apply to this program "preferred admission" when applying to the University of Michigan, or students already enrolled at the university may apply to transfer into the program beginning in their sophomore year.

=== Master's degrees ===
The Master of Science in Information (MSI) degree is a 48-credit hour professional degree built on a core curriculum of "foundations" courses that synthesize content and methodology from library and information science, computer science, the humanities, and the social sciences. Real-world engagement is a hallmark of the master's program: all students are required to complete internships or mentorships in the field. The program is highly interdisciplinary, featuring faculty and students from a wide range of academic fields. The Master of Science in Information degree program is accredited by the American Library Association (ALA) and considered equivalent to the Master of Library and Information Science degree conferred at other universities.

In 2012, the School of Information and the School of Public Health began offering a new join graduate program in Health Informatics.

As of 2019, the School of Information offers a 34-credit, Master of Applied Data Science (MADS) degree. The degree was developed in collaboration with the U-M Office of Academic Innovation to meet the growing demand for people with experience in data science offered by the School of Information.

=== Doctorate ===
The school's doctoral program is a full-time course of study, typically five years post-baccalaureate, leading to the degree of Doctor of Philosophy (PhD) in Information. The program is designed to enable students to engage in advanced study and research in a various information fields such as the economics of information, human-computer interaction, library and information services, organizational studies, archives and records management, new systems architecture, digital libraries, information systems management, and digital documents/digital publishing.

== Faculty and research ==
Faculty at the school are drawn from an unusually wide range of academic backgrounds including linguistics, public policy, computer science, library and information science, management, law, business, economics, psychology, history, communications, and science and technology studies (STS).

The school's faculty and students are active in research, pursuing projects in various areas and methods. Their stated goal is to develop an integrated understanding of human needs in relation to information systems and social structures, searching for unifying principles that illuminate the role of information in computation, cognition, communication, and community.

The school's infrastructure includes a range of research facilities and equipment. Researchers also have access to a number of off-campus research sites. Projects are often collaborations with researchers from other units at the university.
