= List of Arizona State University alumni in science and technology =

Arizona State University (ASU) has graduated a number of notable people in science and technology. This includes graduates and non-graduate former students who are notable for their achievements within science and technology, sometimes before or after their time at ASU. Other alumni can be found in the list of Arizona State University alumni and its partial lists.

== Earth science ==
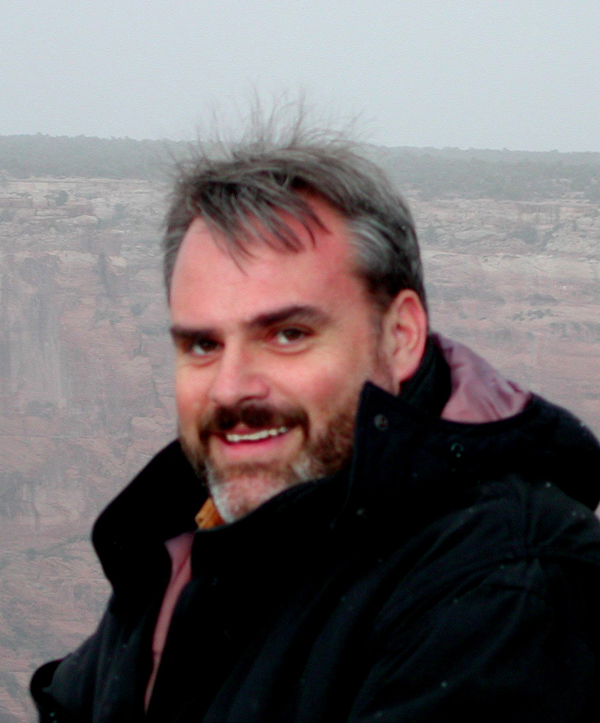
Tom Paradise

Earth science
Name	Class year	Notes	Ref.
Scott G. Borg	(MS, PhD)	Geologist	
Marta Lucía Calvache	1995 (PhD)	Colombian volcanologist	
Christopher Glein		Geochemist	
Kayla Iacovino	2010	Volcanologist	
Craig D. Idso		Geographer	
Penelope L. King	1999 (PhD)	Geochemist	
Larry Lake	1967	Professor of petroleum and geosystems engineering	
Tom Paradise	1993 (PhD)	Geomorphologist	
Nancy L. Ross	1985	Geoscientist	
Emily Stanley	1993 (PhD)	Professor of limnology	
Ellen E. Wohl	1984	Professor of geology	

== Engineering ==
Engineering
Name	Class year	Notes	Ref.
Curtis Ashton	1992	Electrical engineer, IEEE Fellow	
Daniel W. Bliss	1989	Engineer and physicist, professor at ASU	
Diann Brei	1988	Professor of mechanical engineering	
John R. Clymer	1971 (PhD)	Systems engineer and professor of electrical engineering and systems engineering	
Leroy S. Fletcher	1968 (PhD)	Professor of mechanical engineering, president of the American Society of Mechanical Engineers	
Aaron D. Franklin	2008 (PhD)	Professor of electrical engineering	
Peng Lianmao	1988 (PhD)	Chinese nanomaterial scientist	
Philipos C. Loizou		Professor of electrical engineering	
Chandrasekhar Nataraj	1984 (MS)	Professor of mechanical engineering	
Robert Rennaker	1997	Neural engineer	
Anne Silverman		Professor of mechanical engineering	
Jian Tang	2006 (PhD)	Chinese-American electrical engineer	
Dragica Vasileska	1995 (PhD)	Electrical engineer and professor at ASU	

== Life science and ecology ==
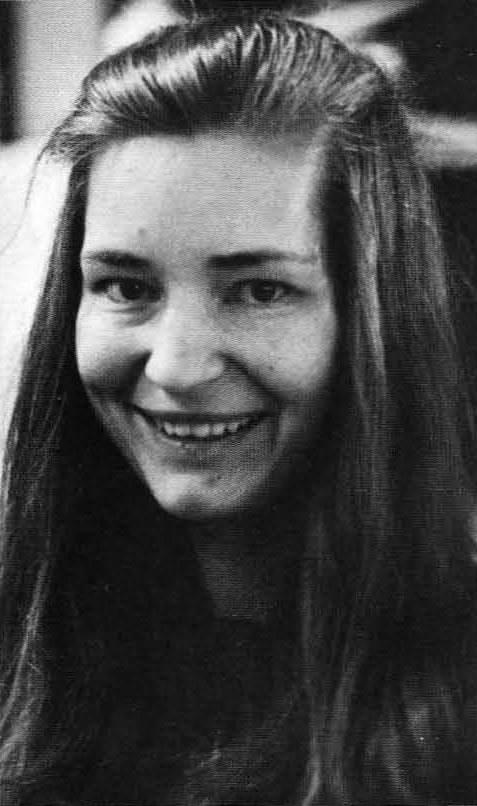
Barbara Wold

Life science and ecology
Name	Class year	Notes	Ref.
David J. Begun	1989 (MS)	Geneticist and evolutionary biologist	
Kansri Boonpragob	(PhD)	Thai lichenologist and climatologist	
Denise Breitburg		Marine ecologist	
Bradley Cardinale	1993	Ecologist, conservation biologist, academic and researcher	
C. Kenneth Dodd Jr.	1972 (PhD)	Herpetologist and conservationist	
Wei-Ta Fang	1994 (MEP)	Taiwanese wetland scientist	
Temple Grandin	1975 (MS)	Animal behavior expert, author, autism advocate	
Carlos V. Grijalva	1974 (MS)	Physiological psychologist	
Nancy Grimm	1985 (PhD)	Ecosystem ecologist	
Shelley Hurwitz	1977	Biostatistician	
Keith E. Idso	(PhD)	Botanist	
Charles Kazilek	1983	Science communicator, founder of Ask a Biologist	
Carolyn Larabell	1981	Structural biologist, X-ray microtomographer	
Christine Lee	1999 (MA)	Bioarchaeologist	
Therese Ann Markow		Professor of ecology and evolutionary biology	
Allen J. Moore		Professor of entomology	
Allan A. Schoenherr	(PhD)	Ecologist	
Chester B. Scrignar		Forensic psychiatrist	
Krystal Tsosie		Geneticist and bioethicist	
Barbara Wold	1973	Professor of molecular biology	
Frank Zalom	1973	Entomologist	

== Mathematics ==
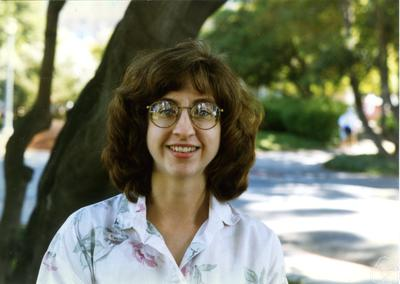
Sarah Witherspoon

Mathematics
Name	Class year	Notes	Ref.
Connie M. Borror	1998 (PhD)	Statistician, first woman to win the Shewhart Medal	
Joaquín Bustoz Jr.	1962	Mathematician and math professor at ASU	
Ricardo Cortez	1986	Professor of mathematics	
Shirley M. Frye		Mathematics educator	
Judith Gersting	1969 (PhD)	Mathematician and professor of computer science	
Trachette Jackson	1994	Professor of mathematics	
Ana Kupresanin	2009 (PhD)	Croatian-American statistician	
Sarah Witherspoon	1988	Mathematician	

== Medicine ==
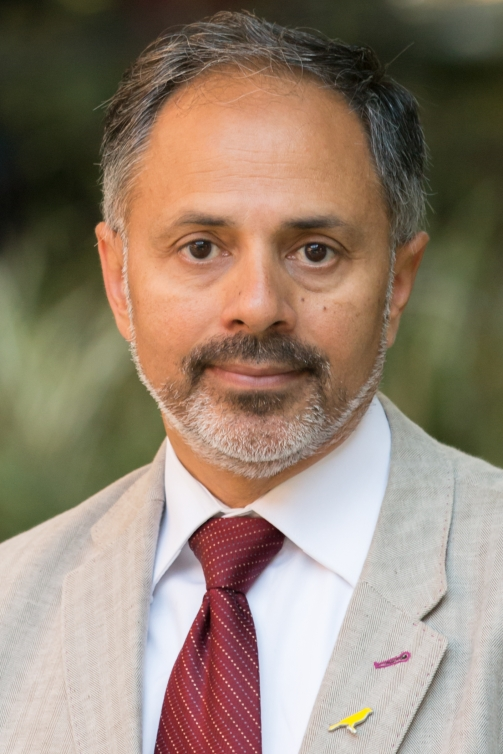
Sanjiv Sam Gambhir

Medicine
Name	Class year	Notes	Ref.
Suzanne Bakken		Nurse, professor of biomedical informatics	
Angela Bryan	1994 (MA)	Professor of psychology and neuroscience	
Linda Burnes Bolton		Nursing researcher, president of the American Academy of Nursing	
Angela Byars-Winston	(PhD)	Professor of internal medicine	
Sanjiv Sam Gambhir	1983	Physician; chair of the Department of Radiology at Stanford University School of Medicine	
Amy Greer		Canadian infectious disease epidemiologist	
Jessica Knurick	2012 (PhD)	Dietitian	
Larry Lemanski	1968 (MS)	Director of the Biomedical Institute for Regenerative Research at East Texas A&M University	
Robert Rey	1983	Plastic surgeon	
Nicole Saphier		Radiologist and medical journalist	
Jorunn Sundgot-Borgen	1985 (MS)	Norwegian professor of sports medicine	
Nicholas Tatonetti		Professor of biomedical informatics	

== Physics and chemistry ==
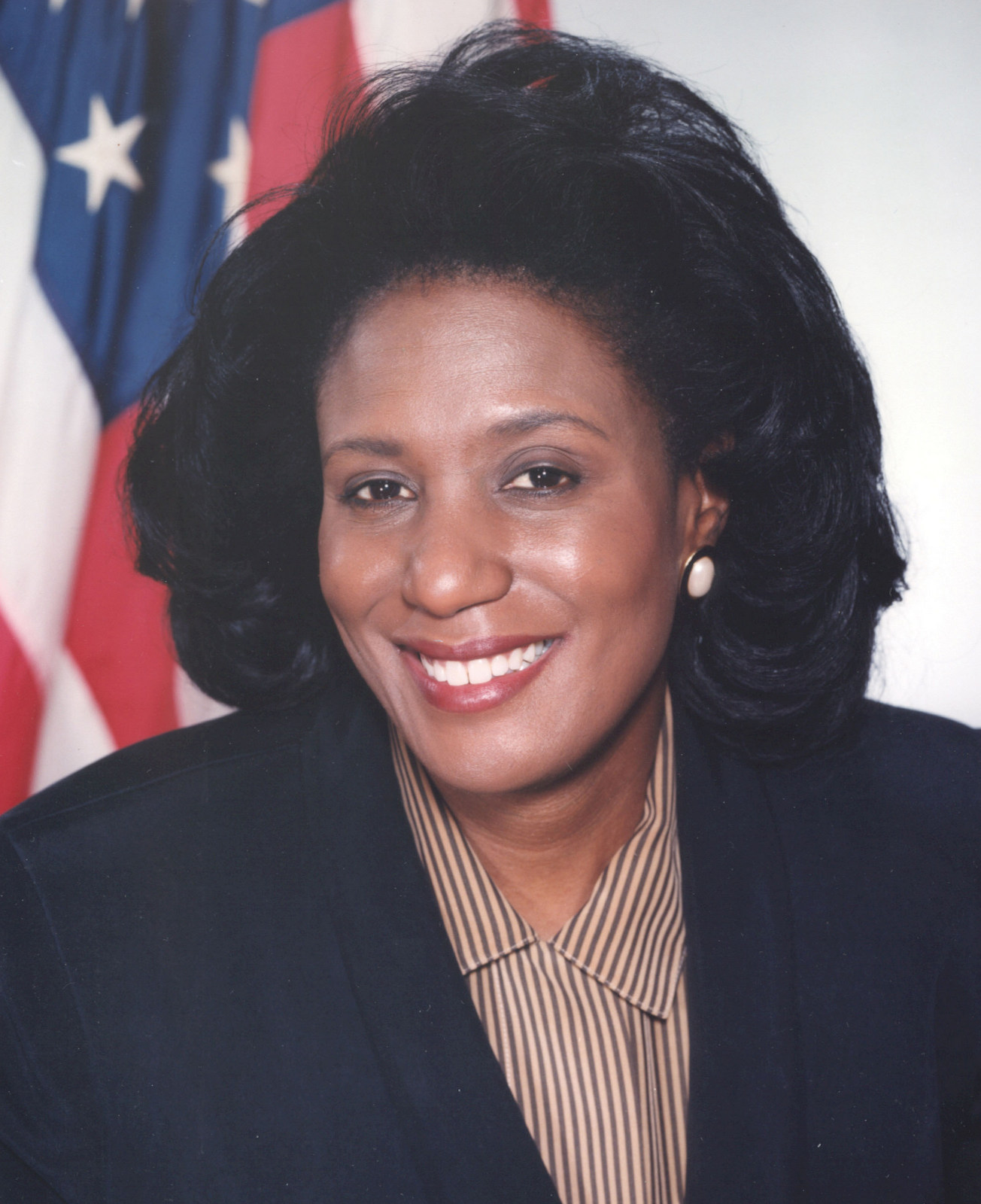
Cheryl L. Shavers

Physics
Name	Class year	Notes	Ref.
Chia-Seng Chang	1988 (PhD)	Taiwanese physicist	
Barbara J. Garrison	1971	Chemist	
Paul F. McMillan	1981	Chemist and high-pressure scientist, professor at ASU and University College London	
Richard C. Powell	(MS, PhD)	Professor of physics, director of the Optical Science Center at the University of Arizona	
Theresa M. Reineke	1998 (MS)	Chemist	
Cheryl L. Shavers	1976	Chemist and engineer; U.S. Under Secretary of Commerce for Technology, 1999–2001	
Spencer Silver	1962	Inventor of the adhesive used in Post-it notes	
Zhong Lin Wang	1987 (PhD)	Physicist, materials scientist and engineer; winner of the Albert Einstein World Award of Science	

== Space science ==
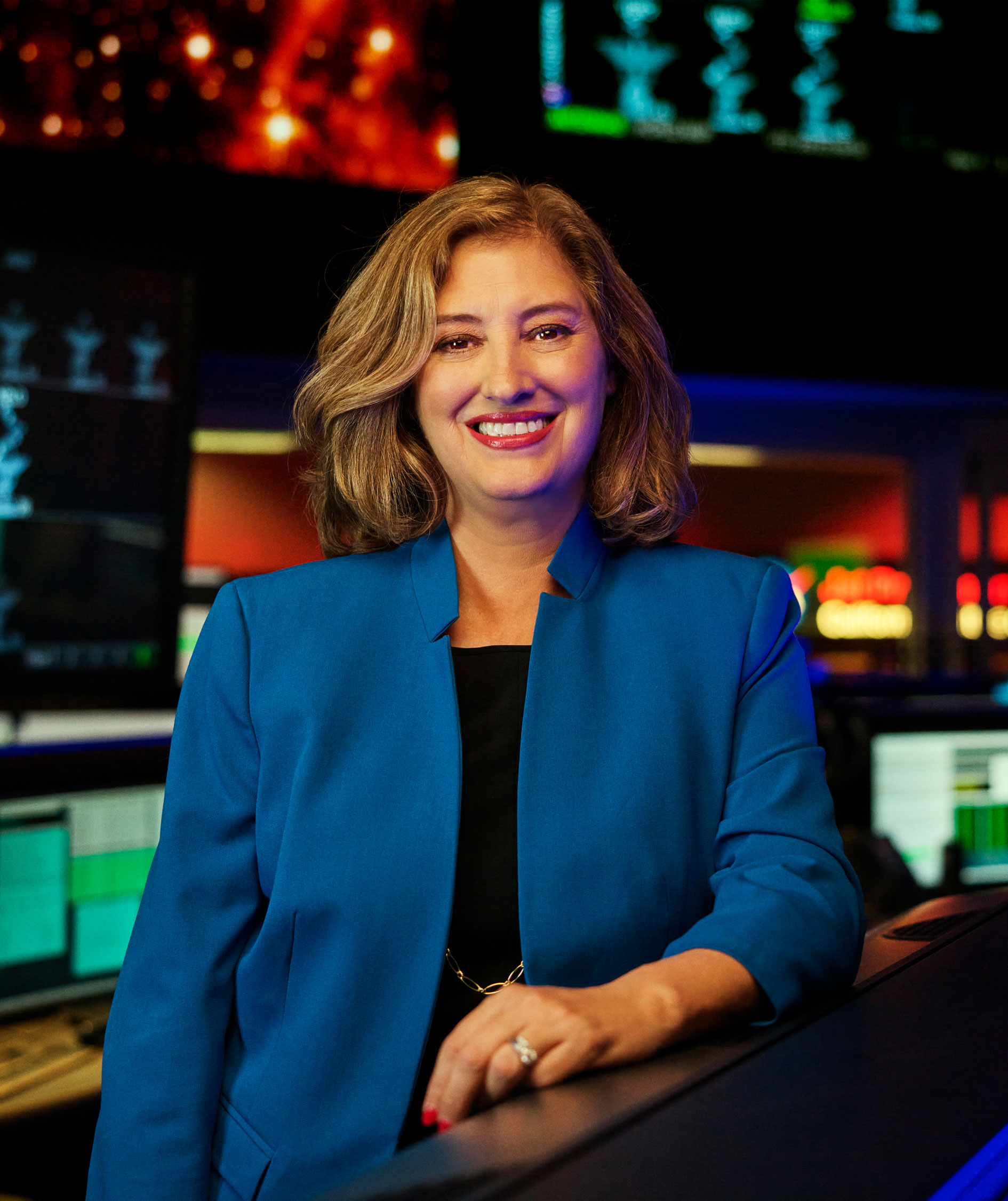
Laurie Leshin

Space science
Name	Class year	Notes	Ref.
Carrie Anderson	2000	Planetary scientist	
Joshua Bandfield	2000 (PhD)	Planetary scientist	
Edward Dwight	1957	First Black astronaut candidate, systems engineer and sculptor	
Scott Jay Kenyon	1978	Astrophysicist	
Laurie Leshin	1987	Director of the Jet Propulsion Laboratory	
Alfred McEwen	1988 (PhD)	Planetary geologist	
Sian Proctor	1998	Commercial astronaut	
Paul Spudis	1976	Geologist and lunar scientist	
Kai Staats		Research director, Space Analog for the Moon and Mars at Biosphere 2	
Amber Straughn	2005 (MS)	Astrophysicist	
Marija Strojnik Scholl	1972	Slovenian astrophysicist	

== Technology and computer science ==
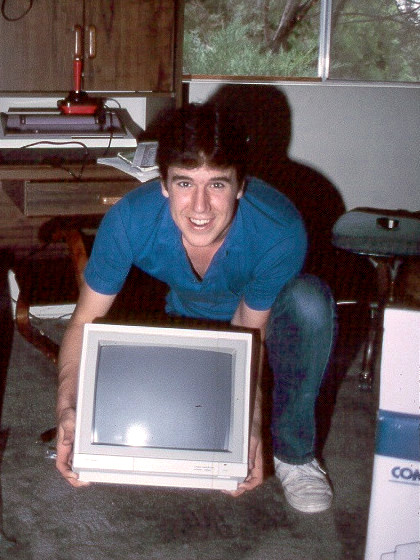
Terry A. Davis

Technology and computer science
Name	Class year	Notes	Ref.
Dennis Austin		Software developer of PowerPoint	
Timothy W. Bickmore	1985 (BSE)	Professor of computer science	
Miles Brundage	2019 (PhD)	Artificial intelligence policy researcher	
Terry A. Davis		Programmer and creator of the TempleOS operating system	
Munmun De Choudhury	2011 (PhD)	Computer scientist	
Dianne Hansford	1988 (MS)	Computer scientist	
Mike Johnson	(MS)	Computer architect and microprocessor designer	
Michael I. Jordan	1980 (MS)	Computer scientist and researcher	
Don Lancaster	1967 (MS)	Author, inventor and microcomputer pioneer	
Cottalango Leon	1996 (MS)	Indian-American computer graphics technician	
Stephanie Ludi	2003 (PhD)	Computer scientist	
Landon Rabern	2013 (PhD)	Computer scientist and mathematician	
Linda Rising	(PhD)	Computing consultant	
Daniel M. Romero		Colombian-American computer scientist	
Kai Shu		Computer scientist	
Jiliang Tang	2015 (PhD)	Chinese computer scientist	
