= Brei =

Brei may refer to:

== Food ==
- Matzah brei, a porridge of Ashkenazi Jewish origin made from matzah fried with eggs
- Schwarzer Brei or Brenntar, a Swabian porridge

== People with the surname ==
- Dieter Brei (born 1950), German footballer and trainer
- Diann Brei, American mechanical engineer
- Douglas Brei (born 1964), American minor league sports executive
- Po Krei Brei, 18th-century ruler of Champa

== Other uses ==
- "Sweet Porridge" (German: Der süße Brei), a German fairy tale
- Brei Holm, a tiny tidal islet in the western Shetland Islands
