= Larry Lake =

Larry Lake is the name of:

- Larry Lake (engineer), American petroleum engineer
- Larry Lake (musician) (1943–2013), Canadian composer, trumpeter, radio broadcaster, and record producer
