= Kuprešanin =

Kuprešanin or (Westernized) Kupresanin is a surname of southern Slavic origin. Notable people with the surname include:

- Ana Kupresanin, Croatian-American statistician
- Dane Kuprešanin (born 1966), Bosnian-Herzegovinian footballer
- Fiona Kupresanin, Australian athlete, winner of 2015 Sunshine Coast Marathon
- Maša Kuprešanin, Serbian contestant on reality TV series Survivor: Dominican Republic
- Nikola Kuprešanin, Bosnian screenwriter of Not So Friendly Neighborhood Affair
