= Kai Shu =

American computer scientist

- Occupations: Computer scientist, academic, and author
- Awards: NSF Career Award

Academic background
- Education: Chongqing University; Arizona State University (ASU)
- Thesis: Understanding Disinformation: Learning with Weak Social Supervision (2020)

Kai Shu is a computer scientist, academic, and author. He is an assistant professor at Emory University.

Shu's research explores big data, social media, and trustworthy AI, focusing on detecting fake news, analyzing social networks, enhancing cybersecurity, and investigating health informatics; he also holds three patents for his contributions. He is the lead author of Detecting Fake News on Social Media, and the lead editor of Disinformation, Misinformation, and Fake News in Social Media. He has received the NSF CAREER Award, the AI 2000 Most Influential Scholar Honorable Mention by Aminer, the Google Cloud Research Credits Award, and the College of Computing Dean's Excellence in Research Award from Illinois Tech.

== Education ==
Shu completed his Bachelor of Engineering in Network Engineering from Chongqing University in 2012 and later obtained a Master of Science in Computer Science and Technology from the same institution in 2015. He then got his PhD in Computer Science at Arizona State University in 2020 under the supervision of Huan Liu, where he completed his dissertation on "Understanding Disinformation: Learning with Weak Social Supervision."

== Career ==
Shu was a research intern at Hewlett-Packard Labs in China, under the mentorship of Ping Luo, from 2012 to 2013. Following this, he served as a Research Visiting scholar at the Chinese Academy of Sciences in China for a year in 2015, then joined Yahoo Research in California as a Research Intern in 2018 and subsequently moved to Microsoft Research as a Research Intern in 2019.

Shu transitioned to his first academic role in September 2015 where he served as a Research Assistant at the Arizona State University, till July 2020. From 2020 to 2024, he held the position of Gladwin Development Chair Assistant Professor at the Illinois Institute of Technology. In 2024, he move to Emory University as an assistant professor.

== Research ==
Shu's research areas include machine learning, data mining, and social computing with applications such as disinformation, education, and healthcare.

=== Social media and misinformation ===
Shu's research on social media focused on the phenomenon of news consumption's popularity despite lower quality and increased fake news, stressing the importance of grasping the correlation between user profiles and fake news for future research. Highlighting social media's dual role as both a gateway to information and a channel for misinformation, he advocated for sophisticated algorithms using user engagement data to combat the spread of false information. In his 2019 book, Detecting Fake News on Social Media, he covered concepts such as detection methods and challenging issues. His subsequent work, Disinformation, Misinformation, and Fake News in Social Media, published in 2020, provided an overview of disinformation, offering insights into user engagements, detection techniques, and emerging ethical and technological considerations. Furthermore, he and his co-authors introduced TriFN, an approach aimed at mitigating the challenge of fake news proliferation on social media, leveraging social context—such as relationships among publishers, news pieces, and users—to enhance fake news detection compared to existing methods.

In related research Shu introduced an explainable fake news detection method that outperformed existing approaches by using a sentence-comment co-attention sub-network, providing better insights into why certain news pieces are deemed fake. To address the prevalent fake news issue, his study presented FakeNewsNet, a repository containing two datasets with diverse features, aiming to facilitate research on fake news detection and analysis on social media platforms.

=== Safe and responsible large language models ===
Shu's research delved into how the public used large language models (LLMs) for healthcare purposes as well, revealing their popularity for medical Q&A and self-diagnosis and highlighting LLMs' role in enhancing information quality, reducing misinformation, and optimizing convenience in accessing healthcare information, especially regarding their use by doctors for diagnosis. He also discussed how instruction-tuned Large Language Models (LLMs) are trained for AI safety alignment but face vulnerability in their alignment, posing potential harm.

== Awards and honors ==
- 2021 – Distinguished Doctoral Dissertation Award, BenchCouncil
- 2021 – Google Cloud Research Credits Award, Google
- 2022 – AI 2000 Most Influential Scholar Honorable Mention, Aminer
- 2023 – AI 2000 Most Influential Scholar Honorable Mention, Aminer
- 2023 – Cisco Faculty Research Award, Cisco
- 2024 – NSF Career Award, U.S. National Science Foundation
- 2024 – College of Computing Dean's Excellence in Research Award, Illinois Tech

== Bibliography ==
=== Books ===
- Detecting Fake News on Social Media (2019) ISBN 978-1681735825
- Disinformation, Misinformation, and Fake News in Social Media: Emerging Research Challenges and Opportunities (2020) ISBN 978-3030426989

=== Selected articles ===
- Shu, K., Sliva, A., Wang, S., Tang, J., & Liu, H. (2017). Fake news detection on social media: A data mining perspective. ACM SIGKDD explorations newsletter, 19(1), 22–36.
- Shu, K., Wang, S., & Liu, H. (2018, April). Understanding user profiles on social media for fake news detection. In 2018 IEEE conference on multimedia information processing and retrieval (MIPR) (pp. 430–435). IEEE.
- Shu, K., Wang, S., & Liu, H. (2019, January). Beyond news contents: The role of social context for fake news detection. In Proceedings of the twelfth ACM international conference on web search and data mining (pp. 312–320).
- Shu, K., Cui, L., Wang, S., Lee, D., & Liu, H. (2019, July). defend: Explainable fake news detection. In Proceedings of the 25th ACM SIGKDD international conference on knowledge discovery & data mining (pp. 395–405).
- Shu, K., Mahudeswaran, D., Wang, S., Lee, D., & Liu, H. (2020). Fakenewsnet: A data repository with news content, social context, and spatiotemporal information for studying fake news on social media. Big data, 8(3), 171–188.
