= Sanjiv Sam Gambhir =

American physician–scientist (1962–2020)

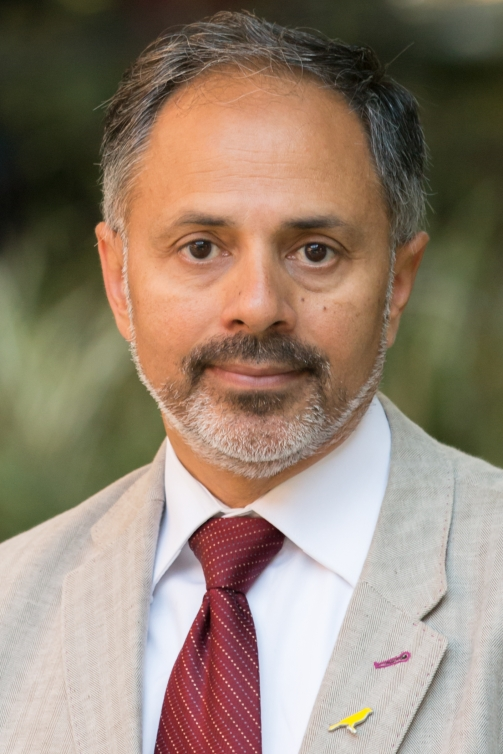
- Born: November 23, 1962; Ambala, Haryana, India
- Died: July 18, 2020 (aged 57)
- Education: Arizona State University (B.S.), University of California, Los Angeles (M.D. & Ph.D.)
- Known for: Molecular Imaging, Nuclear Medicine, PET-CT, and Early Cancer Detection
- Awards: Institute of Medicine (IOM) of the US National Academies (2008) American Association for the Advancement of Science (2014) National Academy of Inventors (2015)
- Scientific career
- Fields: Nuclear Medicine, Radiology, and Bioengineering
- Workplaces: Stanford University
- Academic advisors: M.E. Phelps, S.C. Huang, and H.R. Herschman

Sanjiv Sam Gambhir (November 23, 1962 – July 18, 2020) was an American physician–scientist. He was the Virginia and D.K. Ludwig Professor in Cancer Research, Chairman of the Department of Radiology at Stanford University School of Medicine, and a professor by courtesy in the departments of Bioengineering and Materials Science and Engineering at Stanford University. Additionally, he served as the Director of the Molecular Imaging Program at Stanford (MIPS), Canary Center at Stanford for Cancer Early Detection and the Precision Health and Integrated Diagnostics Center (PHIND). He authored 680 publications and had over 40 patents pending or granted. His work was featured on the cover of over 25 journals including the Nature Series, Science, and Science Translational Medicine. He was on the editorial board of several journals including Nano Letters, Nature Clinical Practice Oncology, and Science Translational Medicine. He was founder/co-founder of several biotechnology companies and also served on the scientific advisory board of multiple companies. He mentored over 150 post-doctoral fellows and graduate students from over a dozen disciplines. He was known for his work in molecular imaging of living subjects and early cancer detection.

== Personal ==
Gambhir was born in Ambala, India, and moved to the US with his parents and sister in 1969. He was raised in Phoenix, Arizona. He was married to Aruna Bodapati Gambhir and lived in the Bay Area. He died July 18, 2020, of cancer of unknown primary. His son, Milan Gambhir, was born in 1998 and died from a glioblastoma in 2015.

== Education and employment ==
Gambhir was a Phi Beta Kappa graduate of Arizona State University where he received his BS in physics. He then entered the combined MD–PhD Medical Scientist Training Program (MSTP) at the University of California Los Angeles (UCLA) and received his MD, and his PhD in biomathematics.

His first academic appointment was in 1994, at UCLA, as an assistant professor of molecular and medical pharmacology. He was a clinical attending in the Nuclear Medicine Department at the Center for Health Sciences at UCLA starting in 1997. He was appointed tenure professorship at UCLA in 2003. In 2003, he moved to Stanford University and was appointed professor of radiology, head of nuclear medicine, director of the Molecular Imaging Program at Stanford (MIPS), director of the Precision Health and Integrated Diagnostics (PHIND) Center, division chief of the Canary Center for Cancer Early Detection, and member of the Bio-X Program. He became the Virginia and D.K. Ludwig Professor for Clinical Investigation in Cancer Research, which is an endowed professorship, in 2009. He was appointed the chair of radiology in August 2011.

== Honors and awards ==
Gambhir received the following:

- Taplin Award
- Holst Medal
- Academy of Molecular Imaging (AMI) Distinguished Basic Scientist of the Year Award
- Society for Molecular Imaging (SMI) Achievement Award
- Distinguished Clinical Scientist Award from the Doris Duke Charitable Foundation
- Hounsfield Medal (Imperial College London)
- Fellowship of the American Institute for Medical and Biological Engineering (AIMBE)
- Paul C. Aebersold Award
- Organizer and co-chair for the Nobel Symposium in Imaging (2008)
- Inducted as a member of the American Society for Clinical Investigation (ASCI)
- Tesla Medal
- Elected to the Institute of Medicine (IOM) of the US National Academies
- Parmley Prize
- Radiological Society of North America (RSNA)
- Outstanding Researcher Award
- Gopal Subramanian Lifetime Achievement Award
- George Charles de Hevesy Nuclear Pioneer Award
- Aunt Minnie Award
- Distinguished Scientist Award for Distinguished Contributions to Nuclear Medicine
- Society of Asian American Scientists in Cancer Research Award
- American Association of Indian Scientists in Cancer Research Lifetime Achievement Award
- American Association for the Advancement of Science (AAAS) Fellow Award
- J. Allyn Taylor International Prize in Medicine
- National Academy of Inventors
- American Association for the Advancement of Science
- Basic Science Teaching Award
- Benedict Cassen Prize for Research in Molecular Imaging
- Institute of Electrical and Electronics Engineers (IEEE) Marie Sklodowska-Curie Award - IEEE Advancing Technology for Humanity

== Research focus ==
His research focused on the development of imaging assays to monitor fundamental cellular/molecular events in living subjects with an emphasis on the detection and management of cancer. A particular interest of his research and lab was early cancer detection including combining in vivo and in vitro diagnostics.

== Major contributions ==
PET reporter gene technology, multimodality reporter genes, imaging of gene/cell therapies, imaging of the immune system, imaging of intracellular events in living subjects (e.g., protein-protein interactions), bioluminescence resonance energy transfer (BRET) in living subjects, nanoparticle based imaging, Raman imaging in vivo and photoacoustic molecular imaging with novel imaging agents in living subjects. Decision Management Models for the use of FDG PET in cancer.

== Selected publications ==
- Park, S. M.; Won, D. D.; Lee, B. J.; Escobedo, D.; Esteva, A.; Aalipour, A.; Ge, T. J.; Kim, J. H.; Suh, S.; Choi, E. H.; Lozano, A. X.; Yao, C.; Bodapati, S.; Achterberg, F. B.; Kim, J.; Park, H.; Choi, Y.; Kim, W. J.; Yu, J. H.; Bhatt, A. M.; Lee, J. K.; Spitler, R.; Wang, S. X.; Gambhir, S. S. (2020). "A mountable toilet system for personalized health monitoring via the analysis of excreta". Nature Biomedical Engineering. 4 (6): 624–635. doi:10.1038/s41551-020-0534-9. PMC 7377213. PMID 32251391.
- Haywood, T.; Beinat, C.; Gowrishankar, G.; Patel, C. B.; Alam, I. S.; Murty, S.; Gambhir, S. S. (2019). "Positron emission tomography reporter gene strategy for use in the central nervous system". Proceedings of the National Academy of Sciences of the United States of America. 116 (23): 11402–11407. Bibcode:2019PNAS..11611402H. doi:10.1073/pnas.1901645116. PMC 6561252. PMID 31123153.
- Aalipour A, Chuang HY, Murty S, D'Souza AL, Park SM, Gulati GS, Patel CB, Beinat C, Simonetta F, Martinić I, Gowrishankar G, Robinson ER, Aalipour E, Zhian Z, Gambhir SS (2019). "Engineered immune cells as highly sensitive cancer diagnostics". Nat Biotechnol. 37 (5): 531–539. doi:10.1038/s41587-019-0064-8. PMC 7295609. PMID 30886438.
- Vermesh O., Aalipour A., Ge J., Saenz Y., Guo Y., Park S., Mitsutake Y., Bachmann M., Ooi C.C., Lyons J.K., Mueller K., Arami H., Green A., Wang S.X., Gambhir S.S. (2018). "An Intravascular Magnetic Wire for High-Throughput In Vivo Enrichment of Rare Circulating Cancer Biomarkers". Nature Biomedical Engineering. 2 (9): 696–705. doi:10.1038/s41551-018-0257-3. PMC 6261517. PMID 30505627.
- Mayer A.T., Gambhir S.S. (2018). "Reply: Optimizing Strategies for Immune Checkpoint Imaging with Immuno-PET in Preclinical Study". Journal of Nuclear Medicine. 59 (4): 711–712. doi:10.2967/jnumed.117.205153. PMC 12079170. PMID 29348318.
- Hoehne, A.; James, M. L.; Alam, I. S.; Ronald, J. A.; Schneider, B.; d'Souza, A.; Witney, T. H.; Andrews, L. E.; Cropper, H. C.; Behera, D.; Gowrishankar, G.; Ding, Z.; Wyss-Coray, T.; Chin, F. T.; Biswal, S.; Gambhir, S. S. (2018). "18FFSPG-PET reveals increased cystine/Glutamate antiporter (Xc-) activity in a mouse model of multiple sclerosis". Journal of Neuroinflammation. 15 (1): 55. doi:10.1186/s12974-018-1080-1. PMC 5822551. PMID 29471880.
- Alam I.S., Mayer A.T., Sagiv-Barfi I, Wang K., Vermesh O., Czerwinski D.K., Johnson E.M., James M.L., Levy R., Gambhir S.S. (2018). "Imaging Activated T Cells Predicts Response To Cancer Vaccines" (PDF). Journal of Clinical Investigation. 128 (6): 2569–2580. doi:10.1172/jci98509. PMC 5983309. PMID 29596062. Archived from the original (PDF) on July 27, 2018.
- Sagiv-Barfi I, Czerwinski D.K., Levy S., Alam I.S., Mayer A.T., Gambhir, Levy R. (2018). "Eradication of Spontaneous Malignancy by Local Immunotherapy". Science Translational Medicine. 10 (426): 426. doi:10.1126/scitranslmed.aan4488. PMC 5997264. PMID 29386357.
- Hori, S.S.; A.M. Lutz; R. Paulmurugan; S.S. Gambhir (March 2017). "A Model-Based Personalized Cancer Screening Strategy for Early Detection". Nature Biomedical Engineering. 1 (62): 1–3.
- Keu, Khun Visith; Witney, Timothy H.; Yaghoubi, Shahriar; Rosenberg, Jarrett; Kurien, Anita; Magnusson, Rachel; Williams, John; Habte, Frezghi; Wagner, Jamie R.; Forman, Stephen; Brown, Christine; Allen-Auerbach, Martin; Czernin, Johannes; Tang, Winson; Jensen, Michael C.; Badie, Behnam; Gambhir, Sanjiv S. (2017). "Reporter gene imaging of targeted T cell immunotherapy in recurrent glioma". Science Translational Medicine. 9 (373). doi:10.1126/scitranslmed.aag2196. PMC 5260938. PMID 28100832.
- Park, Seung-min; Wong, Dawson J.; Ooi, Chin Chun; Kurtz, David M.; Vermesh, Ophir; Aalipour, Amin; Suh, Susie; Pian, Kelsey L.; Chabon, Jacob J.; Lee, Sang Hun; Jamali, Mehran; Say, Carmen; Carter, Justin N.; Lee, Luke P.; Kuschner, Ware G.; Schwartz, Erich J.; Shrager, Joseph B.; Neal, Joel W.; Wakelee, Heather A.; Diehn, Maximilian; Nair, Viswam S.; Wang, Shan X.; Gambhir, Sanjiv S. (2016). "Molecular profiling of single circulating tumor cells from lung cancer patients". Proceedings of the National Academy of Sciences. 113 (52): E8379–E8386. Bibcode:2016PNAS..113E8379P. doi:10.1073/pnas.1608461113. PMC 5206556. PMID 27956614.
- Weissleder R, Schwaiger MC, Gambhir SS, Hricak H. (2016). "[Imaging approaches to optimize molecular therapies]". Science Translational Medicine. 8 (355): 355ps16. doi:10.1126/scitranslmed.aaf3936. PMID 27605550. S2CID 4588770..
- Maute, R. L.; Gordon, S. R.; Mayer, A. T.; McCracken, M. N.; Natarajan, A.; Ring, N. G.; Kimura, R.; Tsai, J. M.; Manglik, A.; Kruse, A. C.; Gambhir, S. S.; Weissman, I. L.; Ring, A. M. (2015). "Engineering high-affinity PD-1 variants for optimized immunotherapy and immuno-PET imaging". Proceedings of the National Academy of Sciences of the United States of America. 112 (47): E6506–E6514. Bibcode:2015PNAS..112E6506M. doi:10.1073/pnas.1519623112. PMC 4664306. PMID 26604307.
- Inci, F.; et al. (2015). "Multitarget, quantitative nanoplasmonic electrical field-enhanced resonating device (NE2RD) for diagnostics". Proceedings of the National Academy of Sciences of the United States of America. 112 (32): E4354–E4363. Bibcode:2015PNAS..112E4354I. doi:10.1073/pnas.1510824112. PMC 4538635. PMID 26195743.
- Witney T.H.; James M.L.; Shen B.; Chang E.; Pohling C.; Arksey N.; Hoehne A.; Shuhendler A.; Park J.H.; Bodapati D.; Weber J.; Gowrishankar G.; Rao J.; Chin F.T.; Gambhir S.S. (October 2015). "PET Imaging of Tumor Glycolysis Downstream of Hexokinase Through Noninvasive Measurement of Pyruvate Kinase M2". Science Translational Medicine. 7 (310): 310. doi:10.1126/scitranslmed.aac6117. PMID 26491079. S2CID 206688547.
- Ronald J.A.; Chuang H.Y.; Dragulescu-Andrasi A.; Hori S.S.; Gambhir S.S. (2015). "Detecting Cancers Through Tumor-Activatable Minicircles That Lead to a Detectable Blood Biomarker". PNAS USA. 112 (10): 3068–73. Bibcode:2015PNAS..112.3068R. doi:10.1073/pnas.1414156112. PMC 4364239. PMID 25713388.
- Pan Y.; Volkmer J.P.; Mach K.E.; Rouse R.V.; Sahoo D.; Chang T.C.; Metzner T.J.; de Rijn M.; Skinner E.C; Gambhir S.S.; Weissman I.L.; Liao J.C. (2014). "Endoscopic Molecular Imaging of Human Bladder Cancer Using a CD47 Antibody". Science Translational Medicine. 6 (260): 260. doi:10.1126/scitranslmed.3009457. PMID 25355698. S2CID 18276055.
- Smith, B.R.; E.E.B Ghosn; H. Rallapalli; J.A. Prescher; T. Larson; L.A. Herzenberg; S.S. Gambhir (2014). "Selective uptake of single-walled carbon nanotubes by circulating monocytes for enhanced tumor delivery". Nature Nanotechnology. 9 (6): 481–487. Bibcode:2014NatNa...9..481S. doi:10.1038/nnano.2014.62. PMC 4236538. PMID 24727688.
- Pu, K.; A.J. Shuhendler; J.V. Jokerst; J. Mei; S.S. Gambhir; Z. Bao; J. Rao (2014). "Semiconducting Polymer Nanoparticles as Photoacoustic Molecular Imaging Probes in Living Mice". Nature Nanotechnology. 9 (3): 233–9. Bibcode:2014NatNa...9..233P. doi:10.1038/nnano.2013.302. PMC 3947658. PMID 24463363.
- Bohndiek, S.E.; A. Wagadarikar; C.L. Zavaleta; D. Van de Sompel; E. Garai; J.V. Jokerst; S. Yazdanfar; S.S. Gambhir (2013). "A Small Animal Raman Instrument for Rapid, Wide-Area, Spectroscopic Imaging". PNAS USA. 110 (30): 12408–13. Bibcode:2013PNAS..11012408B. doi:10.1073/pnas.1301379110. PMC 3725059. PMID 23821752.
- Zavaleta, C.; E. Garai; J.T. Liu; S. Sensam; M.J. Mandella; D. Van de Sompel; S. Friedland; J. Van Dam; C.H. Contag; S.S. Gambhir (2013). "A Raman-Based Endoscopic Strategy for Multiplexed Molecular Imaging". PNAS USA. 110 (25): E2288-97. Bibcode:2013PNAS..110E2288Z. doi:10.1073/pnas.1211309110. PMC 3690865. PMID 23703909.
- Jokerst, J.; C. Khademi; S.S. Gambhir (2013). "Intracellular Aggregation of Multimodal Silica Nanoparticles for Ultrasound-Guided Stem Cell Implantation". Science Translational Medicine. 5 (177): 177ra35. doi:10.1126/scitranslmed.3005228. PMC 3839309. PMID 23515077.
- Ziv, K.; S.S. Gambhir (2013). "Bioengineering and Regenerative Medicine: Keeping Track". Nature Materials. 12 (3): 180–1. Bibcode:2013NatMa..12..180Z. doi:10.1038/nmat3579. PMID 23422714.
- Chan, C.T.; R.E. Reeves; R. Geller; S.S. Yaghoubi; A. Hoehne; D.E. Solow-Cordero; G. Chiosis; T.F. Massoud; R. Paulmurugan; S.S. Gambhir (2012). "Discovery and Validation of Small-Molecule Heat-Shock Protein 90 Inhibitors Through Multimodality Molecular Imaging in Living Subjects". PNAS USA. 109 (37): E2476-85. doi:10.1073/pnas.1205459109. PMC 3443147. PMID 22895790.
- Kircher, M.F.; A. de la Zerda; J.V. Jokerst; C.L. Zavaleta; P.J. Kempson; E. Mittra; R. Huang; C. Campos; F. Habte; R. Sinclair; C.W. Brennan; I.K. Mellinghoff; E.C. Holland; S.S. Gambhir (April 2012). "A Brain Tumor Molecular Imaging Strategy Using a New Triple-Modality MRI-Photoacoustic-Raman Nanoparticle". Nature Medicine. 18 (5): 829–34. doi:10.1038/nm.2721. PMC 3422133. PMID 22504484.
- Dragulescu-Andrasi, A.; Chan, C. T.; De, A.; Massoud, T. F.; Gambhir, S. S. (2011). "Bioluminescence resonance energy transfer (BRET) imaging of protein–protein interactions within deep tissues of living subjects". Proceedings of the National Academy of Sciences of the United States of America. 108 (29): 12060–12065. Bibcode:2011PNAS..10812060D. doi:10.1073/pnas.1100923108. PMC 3141927. PMID 21730157.
- Kircher MF, Gambhir SS, Grimm J (2011). "Noninvasive cell-tracking methods". Nat Rev Clin Oncol. 8 (11): 677–88. doi:10.1038/nrclinonc.2011.141. PMID 21946842. S2CID 24948508.]
- Hori, S.S.; S.S. Gambhir (November 2011). "Mathematical Model Identifies Blood Biomarker-Based Early Cancer Detection Strategies and Limitations". Science Translational Medicine. 3 (109): 109ra116. doi:10.1126/scitranslmed.3003110. PMC 3423335. PMID 22089452.
- Thakor, A.; R. Luong; R. Paulmurugan; F. Lin; P. Kempen; C. Zavaleta; P. Chu; T.F. Massoud; R. Sinclair; S.S. Gambhir (April 2011). "The Fate and Toxicity of Raman-Active Silica-Gold Nanoparticles in Mice. (Cover Article)". Science Translational Medicine. 3 (79): 79ra33. doi:10.1126/scitranslmed.3001963. PMC 3873137. PMID 21508310.
- Dragulescu-Andrasi, A.; C.T. Chan; A. De; T.F. Massoud; S.S. Gambhir (July 2011). "Bioluminescence Resonance Energy Transfer (BRET) Imaging of Protein-Protein Interactions within Deep Tissues of Living Subjects". PNAS. 108 (20): 12060–5. Bibcode:2011PNAS..10812060D. doi:10.1073/pnas.1100923108. PMC 3141927. PMID 21730157.
- Gaster, R.; D. Hall; C. Nielsen; S. Osterfeld; H. Yu; K. Mach; R. Wilson; B. Murmann; J. Liao; S.S. Gambhir; S. Wang (August 2010). "Matrix-insensitive Protein Assays Push the Limits of Biosensors in Medicine". Nature Medicine. 15 (11): 1327–32. doi:10.1038/nm.2032. PMC 4165514. PMID 19820717.
- Fan-Minogue, H.; Cao, Z.; Paulmurugan, R.; Chan, C. T.; Massoud, T. F.; Felsher, D. W.; Gambhir, S. S. (2010). "Noninvasive molecular imaging of c-Myc activation in living mice". Proceedings of the National Academy of Sciences of the United States of America. 107 (36): 15892–15897. Bibcode:2010PNAS..10715892F. doi:10.1073/pnas.1007443107. PMC 2936612. PMID 20713710.
- Liu, H.; Patel, M. R.; Prescher, J. A.; Patsialou, A.; Qian, D.; Lin, J.; Wen, S.; Chang, Y. F.; Bachmann, M. H.; Shimono, Y.; Dalerba, P.; Adorno, M.; Lobo, N.; Bueno, J.; Dirbas, F. M.; Goswami, S.; Somlo, G.; Condeelis, J.; Contag, C. H.; Gambhir, S. S.; Clarke, M. F. (2010). "Cancer stem cells from human breast tumors are involved in spontaneous metastases in orthotopic mouse models". Proceedings of the National Academy of Sciences of the United States of America. 107 (42): 18115–18120. Bibcode:2010PNAS..10718115L. doi:10.1073/pnas.1006732107. PMC 2964232. PMID 20921380.
- Fan-Minogue, H.; Z. Cao; R. Paulmurugan; C.T. Chan; T.F. Massoud; D.W. Felsher; S.S. Gambhir (September 2010). "Noninvasive Molecular Imaging of c-Myc Activation in Living Mice". PNAS. 107 (36): 15892–7. Bibcode:2010PNAS..10715892F. doi:10.1073/pnas.1007443107. PMC 2936612. PMID 20713710.
- Massoud, T.; R. Paulmurugan; S.S. Gambhir (August 2010). "A Molecularly Engineered Split Reporter for Imaging Protein Protein Interactions with Positron Emission Tomography". Nature Medicine. 16 (8): 921–6. doi:10.1038/nm.2185. PMC 2917476. PMID 20639890.
- Loening, A. Dragulescu-Andrasi, S.S. Gambhir. (2010). "A Red-Shifted Renilla Luciferase for Transient Reporter-Gene Expression". Nature Methods. 7 (1): 5–6. doi:10.1038/nmeth0110-05. PMC 4431758. PMID 20038949.
- d'Souza, A. L.; Tseng, J. R.; Pauly, K. B.; Guccione, S.; Rosenberg, J.; Gambhir, S. S.; Glazer, G. M. (2009). "A strategy for blood biomarker amplification and localization using ultrasound". Proceedings of the National Academy of Sciences of the United States of America. 106 (40): 17152–17157. doi:10.1073/pnas.0903437106. PMC 2749842. PMID 19805109.
- Zavaleta, C.; B. Smith; I. Wilton; W. Doering; G. Davis; B. Shojaei; M. Natan; S.S. Gambhir (August 2009). "Multiplexed imaging of surface enhanced Raman scattering nanotags in living mice using noninvasive Raman spectroscopy". PNAS. 106 (32): 13511–6. Bibcode:2009PNAS..10613511Z. doi:10.1073/pnas.0813327106. PMC 2726370. PMID 19666578.
- Yaghoubi, S.; M. Jensen; N. Sastyamurthy; S. Pubhiraja; D. Paik; J. Czernin; S.S. Gambhir (January 2009). "Non-invasive Detection of Therapeutic Cytolytic T-Cells with [18F]-FHBG PET in a Patient with Glioma". Nature Clinical Practice Oncology. 6 (1): 53–8. doi:10.1038/ncponc1278. PMC 3526373. PMID 19015650.
- D'Souza, A.; J. Tseng; K. Pauly; S. Guccione; J. Rosenberg; S.S. Gambhir; G. Glazer (September 2009). "A Strategy for Blood Biomarker Amplification and Localization using Ultrasound". PNAS. 106 (40): 17152–7. doi:10.1073/pnas.0903437106. PMC 2749842. PMID 19805109.
- Keren, S.; C. Zavaleta; Z. Cheng; A. de la Zerda; O. Gheysens; S.S. Gambhir (April 2008). "Non-invasive Molecular Imaging of Small Living Subjects Using Raman Spectroscopy". PNAS. 105 (15): 5844–49. Bibcode:2008PNAS..105.5844K. doi:10.1073/pnas.0710575105. PMC 2299220. PMID 18378895.
- Schipper, M.; N. Nakayama-Ratchford; C. Davis; N. Kam; P. Chu; Z. Liu; X. Sun; J. Dai; S.S. Gambhir (April 2008). "A Pilot Toxicology Study of Single-Walled Carbon Nanotubes in a Small Sample of Mice". Nature Nanotechnology. 3 (4): 216–21. Bibcode:2008NatNa...3..216S. doi:10.1038/nnano.2008.68. PMID 18654506. S2CID 5357814.
- Willmann, J.; N. van Bruggen; L. Dinkelborg; S.S. Gambhir (July 2008). "Molecular Imaging in Drug Development". Nature Reviews Drug Discovery. 7 (7): 591–607. doi:10.1038/nrd2290. PMID 18591980. S2CID 37571813.
- De la Zerda, A.; C. Zavaleta; S. Keren; S. Vaithilingam; S. Bodapati; Z. Liu; J. Levi; B. Smith; T. Ma; O. Oralkan; Z. Cheng; X. Chen; H. Dai; B. Khuri-Yakub; S.S. Gambhir (August 2008). "Carbon Nanotubes as Photoacoustic Molecular Imaging Agents in Living Mice". Nature Nanotechnology. 3 (8): 557–62. Bibcode:2008NatNa...3..557D. doi:10.1038/nnano.2008.231. PMC 2562547. PMID 18772918.
- Lu, Y.; Dang, H.; Middleton, B.; Zhang, Z.; Washburn, L.; Stout, D. B.; Campbell-Thompson, M.; Atkinson, M. A.; Phelps, M.; Gambhir, S. S.; Tian, J.; Kaufman, D. L. (2006). "Noninvasive imaging of islet grafts using positron-emission tomography". Proceedings of the National Academy of Sciences of the United States of America. 103 (30): 11294–11299. Bibcode:2006PNAS..10311294L. doi:10.1073/pnas.0603909103. PMC 1544080. PMID 16868090.
- So MK, Xu C, Loening AM, Gambhir SS, Rao J (2006). "Self-illuminating quantum dot conjugates for in vivo imaging". Nat Biotechnol. 24 (3): 339–43. doi:10.1038/nbt1188. PMID 16501578. S2CID 1366622.]
- Paulmurugan, R.; Gambhir, S. S. (2006). "An intramolecular folding sensor for imaging estrogen receptor–ligand interactions". Proceedings of the National Academy of Sciences of the United States of America. 103 (43): 15883–15888. Bibcode:2006PNAS..10315883P. doi:10.1073/pnas.0607385103. PMC 1635097. PMID 17043219.
- Shu, C. J.; Guo, S.; Kim, Y. J.; Shelly, S. M.; Nijagal, A.; Ray, P.; Gambhir, S. S.; Radu, C. G.; Witte, O. N. (2005). "Visualization of a primary anti-tumor immune response by positron emission tomography". Proceedings of the National Academy of Sciences of the United States of America. 102 (48): 17412–17417. Bibcode:2005PNAS..10217412S. doi:10.1073/pnas.0508698102. PMC 1283986. PMID 16293690.
- Kim SJ, Doudet DJ, Studenov AR, Nian C, Ruth TJ, Gambhir SS, McIntosh CH (2006). "Quantitative micro positron emission tomography (PET) imaging for the in vivo determination of pancreatic islet graft survival". Nat Med. 12 (12): 1423–8. doi:10.1038/nm1458. PMID 17143277. S2CID 33430702.
- Michalet X., Pinaud F.F., Bentolila L.A., Tsay J.M., Doose S., Li J.J., Sundaresan G., Wu A.M., Gambhir S.S., Weiss S. (2005). "Quantum Dots for Live Cells, In Vivo Imaging, and Diagnostics". Science. 307 (5709): 538–544. Bibcode:2005Sci...307..538M. doi:10.1126/science.1104274. PMC 1201471. PMID 15681376.
- Bhaumik, S.; Walls, Z.; Puttaraju, M.; Mitchell, L. G.; Gambhir, S. S. (2004). "Molecular imaging of gene expression in living subjects by spliceosome-mediated RNA trans-splicing". Proceedings of the National Academy of Sciences of the United States of America. 101 (23): 8693–8698. Bibcode:2004PNAS..101.8693B. doi:10.1073/pnas.0402772101. PMC 423257. PMID 15161977.
- Dubey, P.; Su, H.; Adonai, N.; Du, S.; Rosato, A.; Braun, J.; Gambhir, S. S.; Witte, O. N. (2003). "Quantitative imaging of the T cell antitumor response by positron-emission tomography". Proceedings of the National Academy of Sciences of the United States of America. 100 (3): 1232–1237. Bibcode:2003PNAS..100.1232D. doi:10.1073/pnas.0337418100. PMC 298756. PMID 12547911.
- Paulmurugan, R.; Umezawa, Y.; Gambhir, S. S. (2002). "Noninvasive imaging of protein–protein interactions in living subjects by using reporter protein complementation and reconstitution strategies". Proceedings of the National Academy of Sciences of the United States of America. 99 (24): 15608–15613. Bibcode:2002PNAS...9915608P. doi:10.1073/pnas.242594299. PMC 137764. PMID 12438689.
- Ray, P.; Pimenta, H.; Paulmurugan, R.; Berger, F.; Phelps, M. E.; Iyer, M.; Gambhir, S. S. (2002). "Noninvasive quantitative imaging of protein–protein interactions in living subjects". Proceedings of the National Academy of Sciences of the United States of America. 99 (5): 3105–3110. Bibcode:2002PNAS...99.3105R. doi:10.1073/pnas.052710999. PMC 122480. PMID 11854471.
- Adonai, N.; Nguyen, K. N.; Walsh, J.; Iyer, M.; Toyokuni, T.; Phelps, M. E.; McCarthy, T.; McCarthy, D. W.; Gambhir, S. S.; Gambhir, S. S. (2002). "Ex vivo cell labeling with 64Cu–pyruvaldehyde-bis(N4-methylthiosemicarbazone) for imaging cell trafficking in mice with positron-emission tomography". Proceedings of the National Academy of Sciences of the United States of America. 99 (5): 3030–3035. Bibcode:2002PNAS...99.3030A. doi:10.1073/pnas.052709599. PMC 122467. PMID 11867752.
- Bhaumik, S.; Gambhir, S. S. (2001). "Optical imaging of Renilla luciferase reporter gene expression in living mice". Proceedings of the National Academy of Sciences of the United States of America. 99 (1): 377–382. doi:10.1073/pnas.012611099. PMC 117568. PMID 11752410.
- Gambhir SS (2002). "Molecular imaging of cancer with positron emission tomography". Nat Rev Cancer. 2 (9): 683–93. doi:10.1038/nrc882. PMID 12209157. S2CID 136093076.
- Adams JY, Johnson M, Sato M, Berger F, Gambhir SS, Carey M, Iruela-Arispe ML, Wu L (2002). "Visualization of advanced human prostate cancer lesions in living mice by a targeted gene transfer vector and optical imaging". Nat Med. 8 (8): 891–7. doi:10.1038/nm743. PMID 12134144. S2CID 8378089.
- Iyer, M.; Wu, L.; Carey, M.; Wang, Y.; Smallwood, A.; Gambhir, S. S. (2001). "Two-step transcriptional amplification as a method for imaging reporter gene expression using weak promoters". Proceedings of the National Academy of Sciences of the United States of America. 98 (25): 14595–14600. Bibcode:2001PNAS...9814595I. doi:10.1073/pnas.251551098. PMC 64727. PMID 11734653.
- Gambhir, S. S.; Bauer, E.; Black, M. E.; Liang, Q.; Kokoris, M. S.; Barrio, J. R.; Iyer, M.; Namavari, M.; Phelps, M. E.; Herschman, H. R. (2000). "A mutant herpes simplex virus type 1 thymidine kinase reporter gene shows improved sensitivity for imaging reporter gene expression with positron emission tomography". Proceedings of the National Academy of Sciences of the United States of America. 97 (6): 2785–2790. Bibcode:2000PNAS...97.2785G. doi:10.1073/pnas.97.6.2785. PMC 16007. PMID 10716999.
- Wu, A. M.; Yazaki, P. J.; Tsai, S. W.; Nguyen, K.; Anderson, A. L.; McCarthy, D. W.; Welch, M. J.; Shively, J. E.; Williams, L. E.; Raubitschek, A. A.; Wong, J. Y.; Toyokuni, T.; Phelps, M. E.; Gambhir, S. S. (2000). "High-resolution microPET imaging of carcinoembryonic antigen-positive xenografts by using a copper-64-labeled engineered antibody fragment". Proceedings of the National Academy of Sciences of the United States of America. 97 (15): 8495–8500. Bibcode:2000PNAS...97.8495W. doi:10.1073/pnas.150228297. PMC 26976. PMID 10880576.
- Yu Y, Annala AJ, Barrio JR, Toyokuni T, Satyamurthy N, Namavari M, Cherry SR, Phelps ME, Herschman HR, Gambhir SS (2000). "Quantification of target gene expression by imaging reporter gene expression in living animals". Nat Med. 6 (8): 933–7. doi:10.1038/78704. PMID 10932234. S2CID 42839932.
  - Gambhir, S. S.; Barrio, J. R.; Phelps, M. E.; Iyer, M.; Namavari, M.; Satyamurthy, N.; Wu, L.; Green, L. A.; Bauer, E.; MacLaren, D. C.; Nguyen, K.; Berk, A. J.; Cherry, S. R.; Herschman, H. R. (1999). "Imaging adenoviral-directed reporter gene expression in living animals with positron emission tomography". Proceedings of the National Academy of Sciences of the United States of America. 96 (5): 2333–2338. Bibcode:1999PNAS...96.2333G. doi:10.1073/pnas.96.5.2333. PMC 26784. PMID 10051642.
