= Wei-Ta Fang =

Taiwanese wetland scientist

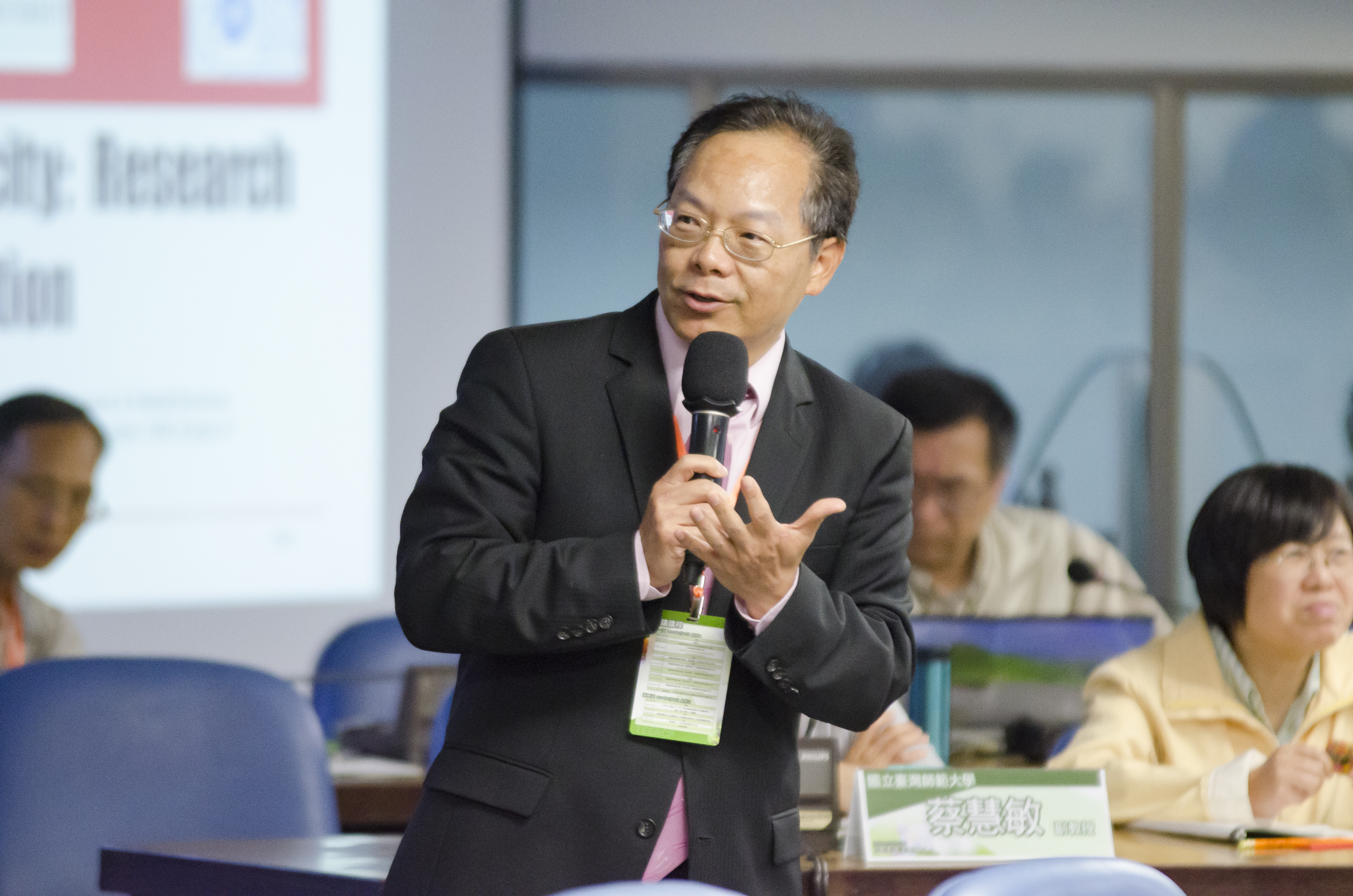
- Born: Fang Wei-ta; February 14, 1966 (age 60); Kaohsiung, Taiwan
- Education: Harvard University, Arizona State University, Texas A&M University
- Occupations: Professor and Director
- Years active: 2012–present
- Children: 2

Wei-Ta Fang (Chinese: 方偉達; pinyin: Fāng Wěidá) is a Taiwanese wetland scientist and environmental educator, a distinguished professor, vice dean of the College of Science, and the director of the Graduate Institute of Sustainability Management and Environmental Education, National Taiwan Normal University. President of the Society of Wetland Scientists (SWS) Asia Chapter.

== Early life and education ==
Fang was born in Kaohsiung, Taiwan on 14 February 1966. He earned a Bachelor of Arts in land economics and administration from National Taipei University in 1989. He completed a master's degree in environmental planning (MEP) from Arizona State University, in 1994, followed by a second master's degree in landscape architecture in design studies (MDes.S.) from the Harvard Graduate School of Design in 2001. He obtained a Ph.D. from the Department of Ecosystem Science and Management, Texas A&M University in 2005.

== Career ==
He served as a specialist in the Taipei Land Management Bureau in 1991 and 1992 and a senior specialist in charge of environmental education and environmental impact assessments (EIAs) at Taiwan's Environmental Protection Administration(EPA) Headquarters from 1994 to 2006. He was also co-principal investigator (co-PI) for the National Environmental Literacy Survey in Taiwan during 2012 and 2020. He is currently serving as distinguished professor, vice dean of the College of Science, and as director of the Graduate Institute of Sustainability Management and Environmental Education, National Taiwan Normal University, and is president of the Society of Wetland Scientists (SWS) Asia Chapter. and the president of Taiwan Wetland Society. He was awarded the designation of visiting research fellow from the director, Dr. Xingyuan He at the Northeast Institute of Geography and Agroecology, Chinese Academy of Sciences in Changchun, China in March 2016 His currently studies focus on the psychological, social, and physical environmental characteristics to predict pro-environmental behavioral changes, such as smartphone usage children during COVID-19 periods.

== Publications ==
- 《The Living Environmental Education: Sound Science toward a Cleaner, Safer, and Healthier Future》
- 《Tourism in Emerging Economies: The Way We Green, Sustainable, and Healthy》
- 《Envisioning Environmental Literacy: Action and Outreach》
- 《Determinants of pro-environmental behavior among excessive smartphone usage children and moderate smartphone usage children in Taiwan》
- 《Ecotourism: Environment, Health, and Education》
