= Mike Johnson (technologist) =

American electrical engineer and chip designer

William Michael Johnson is a technologist, and pioneer in superscalar microprocessor design in the United States.

Johnson holds bachelor's and master's degrees in electrical engineering, both from Arizona State University. Johnson was an architect and designer of early reduced instruction set computing (RISC) processors at IBM known as ROMP, in Austin, Texas. Johnson joined Advanced Micro Devices (AMD) in 1985 as the chief architect of the AMD Am29000 family (commonly known as "29K") of microprocessors. He graduated with a Ph.D. in electrical engineering from Stanford University in 1989, working with Professor Mark Horowitz.

He held various management and leadership positions on the AMD K5 and K7 processor teams. He was vice president of the Advanced Architecture Labs, responsible for technology development in the areas of processor, multimedia, networking, telecommunications, and personal computer system products. He was vice president of the AMD Personal Connectivity Solutions Group in 2002. By 2004 he was a senior AMD fellow.

Later he headed Texas Instruments' Austin Microprocessor Design Center. He helped organize a 2005 conference on revitalizing computer architecture research. He served on the electrical engineering advisory council for Arizona State.

Johnson wrote a seminal book on microprocessor superscalar architecture in 1991. The first book on the subject, it was an expanded version of his dissertation, and included an appendix on applying the techniques to the Intel Corporation x86 architecture. He was quoted as saying: "The x86 really isn't all that complex—it just doesn't make a lot of sense."

== Selected works ==
- Mike Johnson, Superscalar Microprocessor Design, Prentice-Hall, 1991, ISBN 0-13-875634-1
- William M. Johnson (June 1989). Super-Scalar Processor Design (PDF). Stanford University Computer Systems Laboratory. Technical Report No. CSL-TR-89-383
- M. D. Smith; M. Johnson; M. Horowitz (April 1989). Limits on multiple instruction issue. 3rd International Conference on Architectural Support for Programming Languages and Operating Systems. Vol. 17. pp. 290–302. doi:10.1145/70082.68209. ISBN 0-89791-300-0.
- M. Johnson (February 26, 1990). RISC performance pushes back: A perspective on performance limits in general-purpose applications. Thirty-Fifth IEEE Computer Society International Conference (Compcon): Intellectual Leverage. Vol. 53. pp. 241–245. doi:10.1109/CMPCON.1990.63683. ISBN 0-8186-2028-5.
- Mike Johnson (November 1995). "RISC-like Design Fares Well for x86 CPUs". Microprocessor Report: 26–27.
- D. Draper; M. Crowley; J. Holst; G. Favor; A. Schoy; J. Trull; A. Ben-Meir; R. Khanna; D. Wendell; R. Krishna; J. Nolan; D. Mallick; H. Partovi; M. Roberts; M. Johnson; T. Lee (November 1997). "Circuit techniques in a 266-MHz MMX-enabled processor". IEEE Journal of Solid-State Circuits. 32 (11): 1650–1664. Bibcode:1997IJSSC..32.1650D. doi:10.1109/4.641685. ISSN 0018-9200.
