= Ellen E. Wohl =

American aquatic scientist (born 1962)

Ellen Eva Wohl
- Born: 1962 (age 63–64)
- Education: Arizona State University (BS); University of Arizona (PhD)
- Scientific career
- Fields: Geology
- Institutions: Colorado State University
- Thesis: Northern Australian paleofloods as paleoclimatic indicators (1988)
- Doctoral advisor: Vic Baker

Ellen E. Wohl (born 1962) is an American fluvial geomorphologist. She is professor of geology with the Warner College of Natural Resources at Colorado State University.

== Education ==
Wohl earned a Bachelor of Science degree in geology from Arizona State University in 1984 and a PhD in geosciences from the University of Arizona in 1988. In 2019, she received a Doctor Honoris Causa from the University of Lausanne, Switzerland.

== Career ==
Wohl has contributed many scholarly articles to academic journals, including Geomorphology, Journal of Geology, Ecological Applications, Water Resources Bulletin, and Geological Society of America Bulletin. She has served as associate editor for Journal of Hydrology, Geological Society of America Bulletin, and Water Research. In 2009, she received the Kirk Bryan Award for research excellence.

Wohl has earned praise for writing for general readers, in prose that "stands with the best of contemporary nature writing." Among her numerous books written for broad audiences are Virtual Rivers: Lessons from the Mountain Rivers of the Colorado Front Range (2001), which documents the history of land-use patterns on the Front Range and their wide-ranging effects on river ecosystems; Disconnected Rivers: Linking Rivers to Landscapes (2004), which offers a primer on the physical, chemical, and biological processes of rivers and a discussion of historical changes to rivers and efforts to rehabilitate them; Of Rock and Rivers: Seeking a Sense of Place in the American West (2009), a memoir of her life in the American West and a lyrical natural history; Transient Landscapes: Insights on a Changing Planet (2015), which reveals the constantly metamorphosing global landscape; Rhythms of Change in Rocky Mountain National Park (2016), which traces environmental changes in the park over the course of a year; and Saving the Dammed: Why We Need Beaver-Modified Ecosystems (2019), which takes readers through twelve months at a beaver meadow in Colorado's Rocky Mountain National Park, exploring how beavers change river valleys and how the decline in beaver populations has altered river ecosystems.

== Selected bibliography ==
- Virtual Rivers: Lessons from the Mountain Rivers of the Colorado Front Range (Yale University Press, 2001) ISBN 978-0300183108
- Disconnected Rivers: Linking Rivers to Landscapes (Yale University Press, 2004) ISBN 978-0300103328
- Of Rock and Rivers: Seeking a Sense of Place in the American West (University of California Press, 2009) ISBN 978-0520257030
- Transient Landscapes: Insights on a Changing Planet (University Press of Colorado, 2015) ISBN 978-1607323686
- Rhythms of Change in Rocky Mountain National Park (University Press of Kansas, 2016) ISBN 978-0700623365
- Saving the Dammed: Why We Need Beaver-Modified Ecosystems (Oxford University Press, 2019) ISBN 978-0190943523
- Following the Bend: How to Read a River and Understand Its Nature (Princeton University Press, 2025) ISBN 978-0691272474

== Awards and honors ==
- Kirk Bryan Award, Geological Society of America (2009)
- Fellow, American Geophysical Union (2013)
- Fellow, Geological Society of America
- Ralph Alger Bagnold Medal, European Geosciences Union (2017)
- G.K. Gilbert Award, American Geophysical Union (2018)
- Distinguished Career Award, Geological Society of America (2018)
- Mel Marcus Distinguished Career Award, American Association Geographers (2020)
- David Linton Award, British Society for Geomorphology (2020)
- G. K. Warren Prize (2024)
