= Judith Gersting =

American mathematician, computer scientist, and textbook author

Judith Lee MacKenzie Gersting (born August 20, 1940) is an American mathematician, computer scientist, and textbook author. She is a professor emerita of computer science at Indiana University–Purdue University Indianapolis and at the University of Hawaiʻi at Hilo.

== Education and career ==
Gersting graduated from Stetson University in 1962, and completed a Ph.D. in mathematics in 1969 at Arizona State University. Her dissertation, Some Results on $t$-Regressive Isols, concerned recursive function theory and was supervised by Matt Hassett.

After holding a faculty position in the department of mathematical sciences at Indiana University–Purdue University Indianapolis (IUPUI) for ten years, and becoming a full professor there, she spent a year at the University of Central Florida before returning to IUPUI in 1981 as professor of mathematics and acting chair of the department of computer and information science. She came to the University of Hawaiʻi at Hilo in 1990, and chaired the computer science department there for many years. After retiring from the University of Hawaiʻi, she became a part-time faculty member at IUPUI.

== Books ==
Gersting's books include:

- Abstract Algebra: A First Look (with Joseph E. Kuczkowski, Marcel Dekker, 1977)
- The Metric System (with Elaine V. Alton, Cummings, 1977)
- Yes–No; Stop–Go: Some Patterns in Mathematical Logic (with Joseph E. Kuczkowski and Don Madden, Crowell, 1977)
- Mathematical Structures for Computer Science (W. H. Freeman, 1982; 7th ed., 2014)
- Technical Calculus with Analytic Geometry (Wadsworth, 1984; Dover, 1992)
- The Computer: History, Workings, Uses & Limitations (with Michael C. Gemignani, Ardsley House, 1988)
- The Programming Process with Pascal (West Publishing, 1989)
- Invitation to Computer Science (with G. Michael Schneider, West Publishing, 1995; 8th ed., Cengage, 2018)
- Visual Basic Programming: A Laboratory Approach (Computer Science Press, 1996)

With Henry M. Walker, she was co-chair and co-editor of the annual symposium on computer science education of SIGCSE in 2002.

== Recognition ==
The University of Hawaii system awarded Gersting the Regents’ Excellence in Teaching Award in 2006.
