= Chester B. Scrignar =

American forensic psychiatrist

- Born: c. 1935; Villa Park, Illinois, U.S.
- Died: May 24, 2007
- Education: Arizona State University; Tulane University School of Medicine
- Occupation: Forensic psychiatrist

Chester B. Scrignar (died May 24, 2007) was an American forensic psychiatrist. He was a Clinical Professor of Psychiatry and Neurology at the Tulane University School of Medicine, and the author of four books. According to his obituary, he was "a pioneer in behavior therapy and post-traumatic stress disorder."

== Selected works ==
- Scrignar, Chester B. (1983). Stress Strategies: The Treatment of the Anxiety Disorders. Basel: Karger. ISBN 9783805536059. OCLC 925206940.
- Scrignar, Chester B. (1996). Posttraumatic Stress Disorder: Diagnosis, Treatment, and Legal Issues. New Orleans, Louisiana: Bruno Press. ISBN 9780945032069. OCLC 36291339.
- Scrignar, Chester B. (2000). From Panic to Peace of Mind: Overcoming Panic and Agoraphobia. Gretna, Louisiana: Wellness Institute. ISBN 9781587410598. OCLC 47281873.
