= Jessica Knurick =

American dietitian and influencer

- Born: July 23, 1987 (age 39)
- Education: Florida Atlantic University (Bachelor's); East Stroudsburg University of Pennsylvania (Master's); Arizona State University (PhD)
- Website: jessicaknurick.com

Jessica Knurick (born July 23, 1987) is an American nutrition scientist, registered dietitian, science communicator, and social media personality. She is most well known for her content debunking claims associated with the Make America Healthy Again (MAHA) movement.

== Health advocacy ==
Knurick began creating content to combat misinformation regarding prenatal and postpartum care. She said that the concerns of the MAHA movement are based on well-founded concerns about health and chronic illnesses, but their explanations for these issues and proposed solutions are not scientific. Knurick criticized Robert F. Kennedy Jr. for making exaggerated claims about the rate of childhood diabetes and in other topics. Knurick also commented on his misunderstandings of dietary guidelines.

She said she tries to be respectful to people who believe in the MAHA movement, because they may not have thought of the issues outside of the MAHA rhetoric they have heard. Knurick said that she had no sympathy for the leaders of the movement, because they "are spreading this misinformation and are making tons of money off of it". She also added that easier access to healthcare and nutrition improved health outcomes, but that programs expanding their access had been cut. Knurick said that MAHA influencers misdirected people on health issues "while enacting policies that are actually making the problem even worse".

She supports the practice of water fluoridation. Knurick said that the MAHA movement ignores health disparities, and that water fluoridation helps low-income people who can not afford fluoride treatments or fluoride toothpastes. She said that changes to COVID-19 vaccine recommendations would leave many without insurance coverage for the vaccination, and said that the policy change was "removing access from people". Knurick has said that artificial food dyes are safe, but that they were used in foods she recommends consuming less of, like candies and junk food. She said they are a marketing tool aimed at children, and that using less food dye could lower consumption of junk foods by children. Knurick said that Robert F. Kennedy Jr.'s announcement that food companies would voluntarily end the use of artificial food dyes was performative and not attached to any regulatory action.

== Personal life ==
Knurick is a first-generation college student. Her paternal grandmother taught her to eat nutritious food and to practice self-care, and served as her inspiration to become a registered dietitian. She attended Arizona State University in 2012 for her PhD. Knurick began teaching nutrition science in 2015 at the University of Nevada, Las Vegas, but does not appear to be listed as a current faculty member. She has children, and some of her earlier content was focused on advice for pregnant women and mothers. Knurick works as a consultant.
