= Amy Greer =

American epidemiologist

- Education: Arizona State University
- Known for: Understanding the dynamics of health emergencies
- Scientific career
- Fields: Epidemiology
- Workplaces: University of Toronto, Trent University, University of Guelph

Amy Greer is a Canadian infectious disease epidemiologist. She joined the Department of Biology at Trent University as an associate professor in January 2024. She also holds an adjunct appointment in the Department of Population Medicine at the University of Guelph where she was a Canada Research Chair (Tier 2) in Population Disease Modeling from 2014-2024. She was elected to the College of the Royal Society of Canada in 2023.

== Biography ==
Greer completed her PhD in infectious disease ecology at Arizona State University, and postdoctoral training at the Hospital for Sick Children. She also holds an Executive Certificate in Public Leadership from the Harvard Kennedy School. Previously, she was an assistant professor at the University of Toronto's Dalla Lana School Of Public Health, and held a Senior Scientist role in the Centre for Communicable Diseases and Infection Control at the Public Health Agency of Canada.

Greer's research focuses on understanding the dynamics of health emergencies with a specific focus on understanding the dynamics of introduction, spread, prevention and control in the context of infectious disease outbreaks in both humans and animals. During the COVID-19 pandemic, Greer led various research efforts, including a survey of 4,981 Canadians in May 2020 to understand attitudes and behaviours towards the Canadian COVID-19 public health response, which found that more than half were unable to self-isolate and stay home from work when necessary. Greer has spoken about different aspects of the COVID-19 pandemic, including COVID-19 testing, in-person learning in schools, and public health practices, for multiple media outlets.

In October 2020, Greer received a Minister of Colleges and Universities Award of Excellence by Minister Ross Romano. This award recognizes Greer's dedication to the local community, post-secondary students and the post-secondary sector during the pandemic.

Greer has published over 120 academic publications, which have been cited over 4,000 times, resulting in an h-index and i10-index of 33 and 68 respectively.

== Select academic publications ==
- Mathematical modelling of COVID-19 transmission and mitigation strategies in the population of Ontario, Canada. Ashleigh R Tuite, David N Fisman, Amy L Greer. Canadian Medical Association Journal. 2020.
- Estimated epidemiologic parameters and morbidity associated with pandemic H1N1 influenza. Ashleigh R Tuite, Amy L Greer, Michael Whelan, Anne-Luise Winter, Brenda Lee, Ping Yan, Jianhong Wu, Seyed Moghadas, David Buckeridge, Babak Pourbohloul, David N Fisman. Canadian Medical Association Journal. 2010.
- Climate change and infectious diseases in North America: the road ahead. Amy Greer, Victoria Ng, David Fisman. Canadian Medical Association Journal. 2008.
