= Tom Paradise =

American geomorphologist and professor of geosciences

Thomas R. Paradise
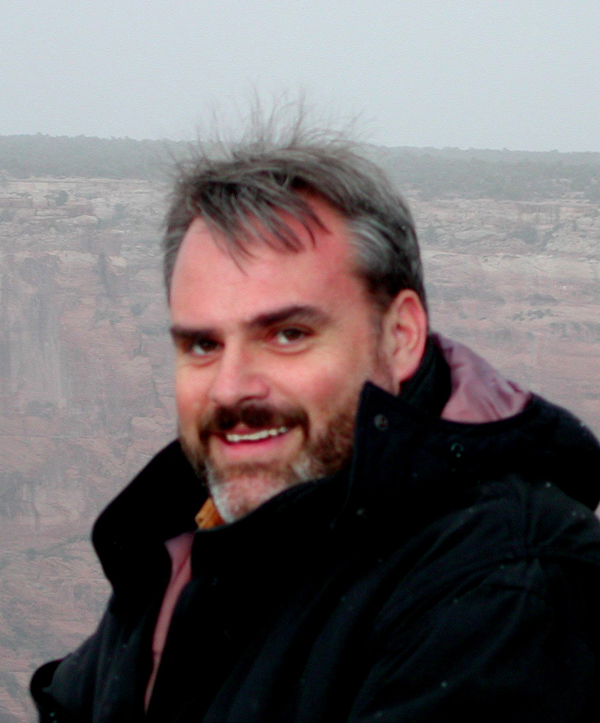
- Born: 15 de febrero de 1957
- Title: Distinguished professor

Academic background
- Education: Arizona State University

Academic work
- Discipline: Geomorphology
- Institutions: University of Arkansas

Thomas R. Paradise (15 de Febrero de 1957) is an American geomorphologist and professor of geosciences at the J. William Fulbright College of Arts and Sciences of the University of Arkansas.

He is known for his work on the Nabatean city of Petra in Jordan, which he has studied since the late 1980s, and has published work on the deterioration of architectural stone. He was the lead researcher and presenter on Petra: Lost City of Stone, broadcast by PBS in 2015.

== Early life and education ==
Paradise grew up in North Beach and Telegraph Hill, San Francisco. He obtained his BS in geosciences and mining in 1979 from the Mackay School of Mines of the University of Nevada. After graduation, he spent 1980 with the Gemological Institute of America, and in 1983 he worked with the Gemological Institute in London.

In 1990 he completed his MS in physical geography and cartography at Georgia State University, and in 1993 he obtained his PhD in geomorphology and cultural heritage management from Arizona State University.

== Career ==
Beginning in 1993 Paradise served as a professor in environmental studies and geography at the University of Hawaii at Hilo. He has been a professor of geosciences at the University of Arkansas since 2000.

== Selected books ==
- (2011). Arkansas: An Illustrated Atlas. Little Rock: The Butler Center and Arkansas Studies Institute.
- (1996). with J. Juvik and S. Juvik. Atlas of Hawaii. Honolulu: University of Hawaii Press.

== Most cited journal articles ==
- Turkington, Alice V., and Thomas R. Paradise. "Sandstone weathering: a century of research and innovation." Geomorphology 67.1-2 (2005): 229-253. (Cited 222 times, according to Google Scholar. 6 June 2022)
- Pope GA, Meierding TC, Paradise TR. Geomorphology's role in the study of weathering of cultural stone. Geomorphology. 2002 Oct 1;47(2-4):211-25. (Cited 152 times, according to Google Scholar. 6 June 2022)
