= Miles Brundage =

AI policy researcher

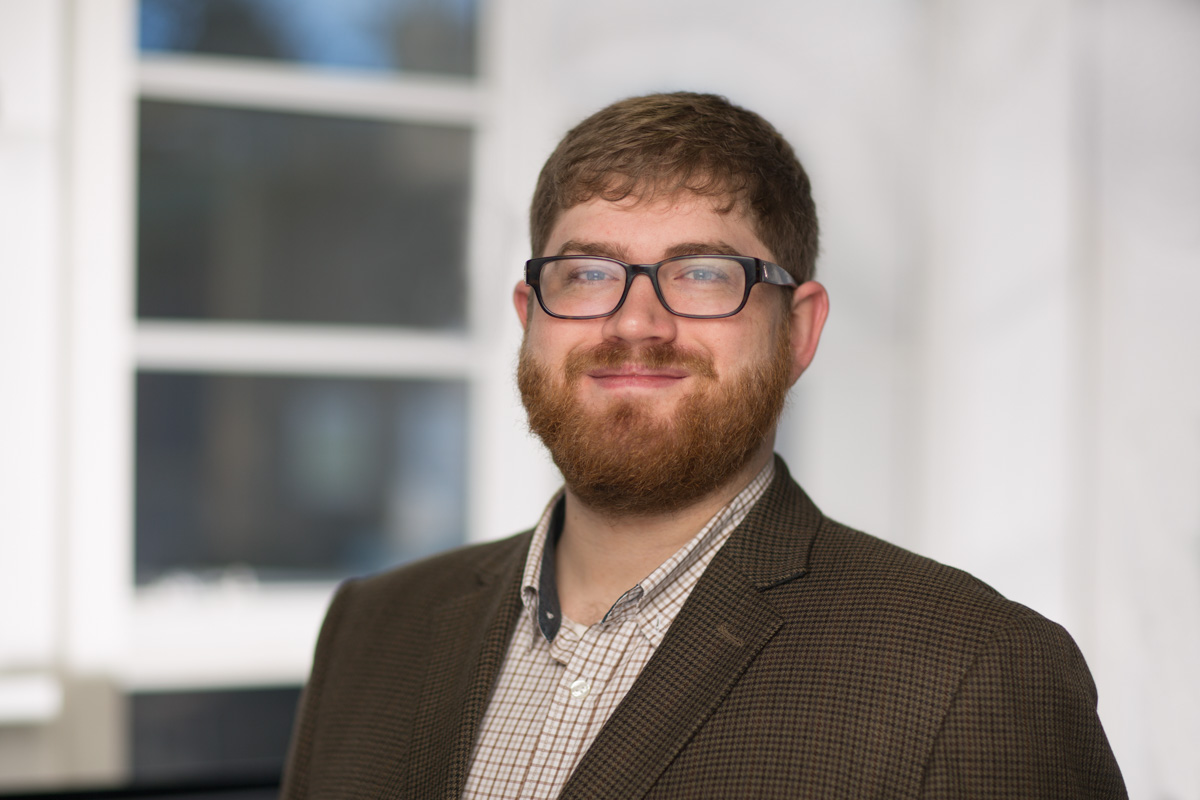
- Brundage in 2017
- Scientific career
- Fields: AI policy
- Institutions: Future of Humanity Institute (2016-2018); OpenAI (2018-2024)
- Thesis: Human and Social Dimensions of Science and Technology (2019)
- Website: milesbrundage.com

Miles Brundage is an artificial intelligence policy researcher.

== Career ==
Brundage received a B.A. degree in political science from George Washington University in 2010. After graduation, he worked at ARPA-E for two years and interned at the Institute for Human and Machine Cognition (IHMC). He earned a PhD in Human and Social Dimensions of Science and Technology from Arizona State University in 2019.

Brundage worked at the University of Oxford's Future of Humanity Institute from 2016 to 2018. He is a member of the Center for a New American Security. He was also a member of Axon's AI and Policing Technology Ethics Board from 2018 to 2022.

=== OpenAI ===
In 2018, Brundage joined OpenAI as a policy researcher, later becoming Head of Policy Research and then Senior Advisor for AGI Readiness. In 2024, he left OpenAI, notably to have more independence and freedom in his research. He said that AI companies and the rest of the world were not ready for artificial general intelligence. His departure attracted widespread media attention, in a context where many prominent AI safety employees or senior managers were progressively leaving OpenAI. In March 2025, Brundage reacted to a blog post by OpenAI, praising it overall but expressing concern about it "rewriting the history" of its deployment approach to put the burden of proof on safety concerns.

=== AI Verification and Evaluation Research Institute ===
In January 2026, Brundage announced the launch of the AI Verification and Evaluation Research Institute (AVERI), a nonprofit organization promoting external auditing of frontier AI models and working to establish AI auditing standards.
