= Sarah Witherspoon =

American mathematician

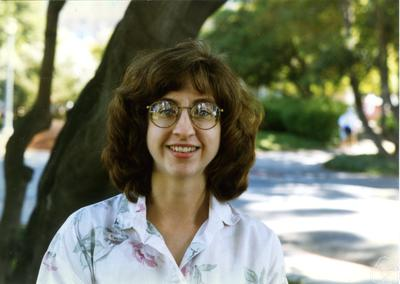
- Born: Sarah Jane Witherspoon
- Education: Arizona State University; University of Chicago
- Scientific career
- Fields: Mathematics
- Workplaces: University of Toronto; Mills College; University of Wisconsin–Madison; Mount Holyoke College; University of Massachusetts Amherst; Amherst College; Texas A&M University

Sarah Jane Witherspoon is an American mathematician interested in topics in abstract algebra, including Hochschild cohomology^{[SW99]} and quantum groups.^{[W96]}^{[BW04]} She is a professor of mathematics at Texas A&M University.

== Education ==
Witherspoon graduated from Arizona State University in 1988, where she earned the Charles Wexler Mathematics Prize as the best mathematics student at ASU that year. She went on to graduate study in mathematics at the University of Chicago, and completed her Ph.D. in 1994. Her dissertation, supervised by Jonathan Lazare Alperin, was The Representation Ring of the Quantum Double of a Finite Group.

== Career ==
Witherspoon taught at the University of Toronto from 1994 to 1998. After holding visiting assistant professorships at Mills College, the University of Wisconsin–Madison, Mount Holyoke College, the University of Massachusetts Amherst, and Amherst College, she joined the Texas A&M faculty in 2004.

== Honors and awards ==
She was elected to the 2018 class of fellows of the American Mathematical Society, "for contributions to representation theory and cohomology of Hopf algebras, quantum groups, and related objects, and for service to the profession and mentoring".

== Selected publications ==
W96.	Witherspoon, S. J. (1996), "The representation ring of the quantum double of a finite group", Journal of Algebra, 179 (1): 305–329, doi:10.1006/jabr.1996.0014, hdl:10338.dmlcz/140609, MR 1367852

SW99.	Siegel, Stephen F.; Witherspoon, Sarah J. (1999), "The Hochschild cohomology ring of a group algebra", Proceedings of the London Mathematical Society, Third Series, 79 (1): 131–157, doi:10.1112/S0024611599011958, MR 1687539, S2CID 53465181

BW04.	Benkart, Georgia; Witherspoon, Sarah (2004), "Two-parameter quantum groups and Drinfel'd doubles", Algebras and Representation Theory, 7 (3): 261–286, arXiv:math/0011064, doi:10.1023/B:ALGE.0000031151.86090.2e, MR 2070408, S2CID 2102411

W19.	Witherspoon, Sarah J. (2019), Hochschild Cohomology for Algebras, Graduate Studies in Mathematics, vol. 204, American Mathematical Society, ISBN 978-1-4704-4931-5
