= Chia-Seng Chang =

Taiwanese physicist

Jason Chia-Seng Chang (Chinese: 張嘉升) is a Taiwanese physicist.

Chang earned a bachelor's degree in physics from National Tsing Hua University in 1978. He subsequently obtained a master's degree in the subject from Marquette University in 1983, followed by a doctorate at Arizona State University (ASU) in 1988. Chang remained at ASU as a postdoctoral researcher before joining Institute of Physics, Academia Sinica in 1991. He later served as director of the Institute of Physics. Chang holds a joint appointment as a professor within National Taiwan University's department of physics.

In 2012, Chang was elected a fellow of the American Physical Society, "[f]or long lasting contribution in surface sciences and nanotechnology research, and innovative developments on scanning probe microscopy, UHV TEM-STM combined system for in-situ nanoscale observation and measurements, and the development of phase plate and wet cell for TEM for biological imaging."
