= C. Nataraj =

American-Indian scientist (born 1959)

Chandrasekhar Nataraj (ಚಂ. ನಟರಾಜ.) (born 1959) is an American-Indian scientist and professor in the Mechanical Engineering Department at Villanova University, where he holds the Mr. and Mrs. Robert F. Moritz, Sr. Endowed Chair position in Engineered Systems. His research includes nonlinear dynamic systems with applications to machinery diagnostics, rotor dynamics, vibration, control, electromagnetic bearings, mobile robotics, unmanned vehicles and biomedical diagnostics. He is currently the editor-in-chief of the Journal of Vibration Engineering & Technologies and associate editor of Nonlinear Dynamics.

== Education ==
Nataraj received a Bachelor of Science degree in mechanical engineering from Indian Institute of Technology in 1982. He then received his Master of Science degree in mechanical engineering from Arizona State University in 1984 for his research on “The Simulation of Cracked Shaft Dynamics” followed by a PhD in 1987 from the same institution. He worked for a year as a research engineer at Trumpler Associates, Inc., after earning his PhD.

== Career ==
Nataraj was hired at the College of Engineering at Villanova in 1988. He founded the Center for Nonlinear Dynamics and Control (CENDAC) in 2002 and served as its first chair. In 2007, Nataraj was elected chair of the department of mechanical engineering.

== Research ==
Nataraj has founded and established two major research centers in the college of engineering at Villanova University. He served as founding director of CENDAC, an interdisciplinary research center which was founded in 2003. In 2015, Nataraj founded the Villanova Center for Analytics of Dynamic Systems (VCADS), which focuses on interdisciplinary research in data analytics, diagnostics and predictive modeling.

Nataraj's research in unmanned boats and surface vehicles has been recognized nationally and internationally. He was leading one of only three teams from the U.S. that participated in the highly selective international maritime RobotX challenge. In 2020, amid the COVID-19 pandemic, Nataraj led the team that designed NovaVent, a low-cost ventilator with open-source schematics.

Nataraj is an author of two textbooks, 60+ articles in peer-reviewed technical journals and books, and 100+ conference proceedings.

== Awards and recognition ==
Nataraj was elected member of the Bower Medal Preselection Committee of the Franklin Institute in 2007. Villanova University awarded him the 2013 Outstanding Faculty Research Award, the third engineering faculty member so honored. He has served on several international committees, including ASME's Technical Committee on Vibration & Sound, the International Federation for the Promotion of Mechanism and Machine Science (IFToMM) Committee, and the Committee for Science and the Arts at the Franklin Institute.
