= Carlos V. Grijalva =

American psychology professor

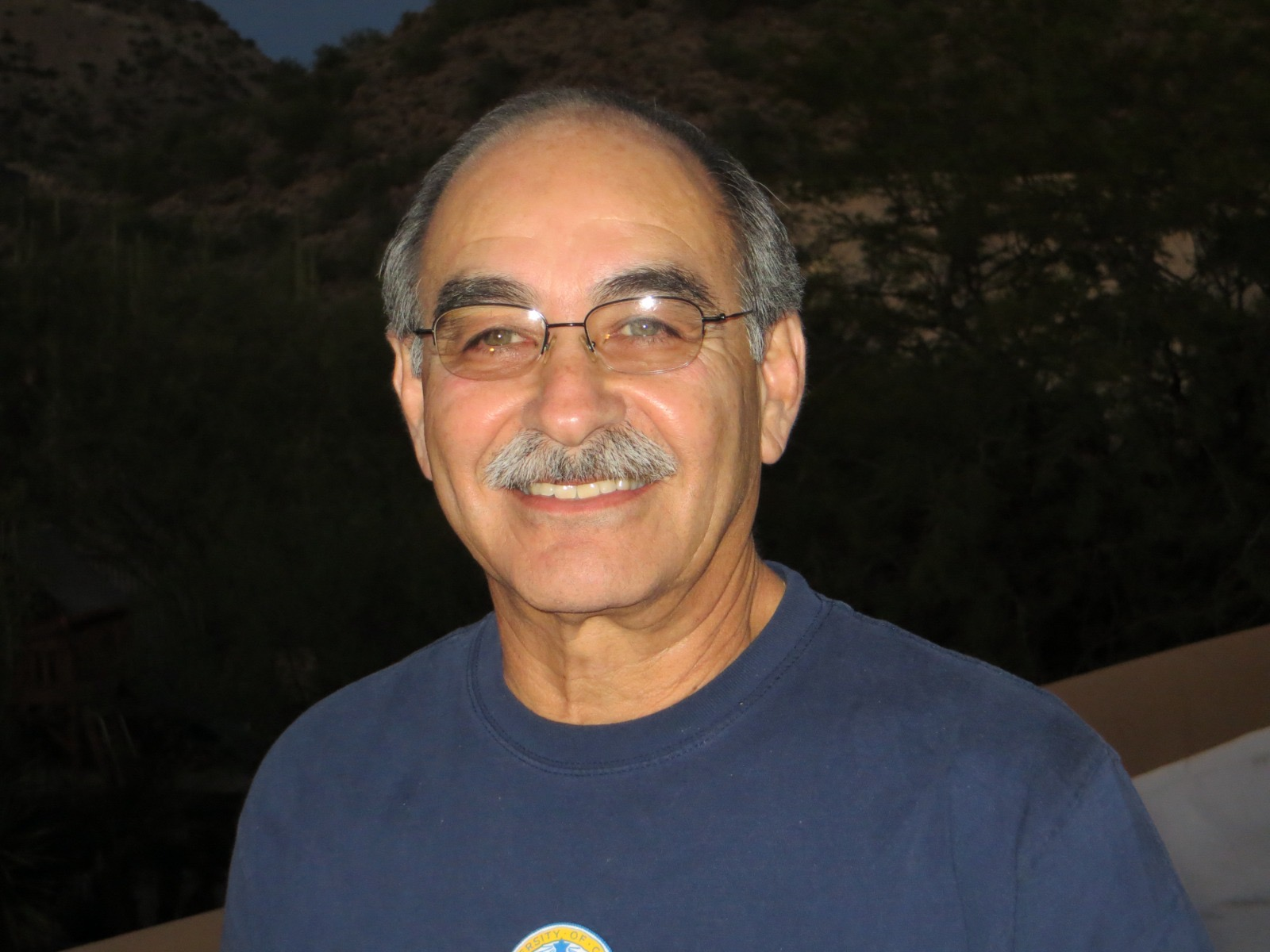
- Occupations: Physiological psychologist and academic

Academic background
- Education: B.A. M.A. Ph.D.
- Alma mater: University of Arizona; Arizona State University

Carlos V. Grijalva is a physiological psychologist and academic. He is an emeritus professor of Psychology and Neuroscience and a member of the Brain Research Institute at the University of California, Los Angeles. His work has conducted research on the psychobiology of stress, behavior, and disease in animal models, with a focus on neural and behavioral mechanisms of feeding and gastrointestinal function.

== Education ==
Grijalva received a B.A. degree from the University of Arizona in 1972. Later, he completed his M.A. from Arizona State University in 1974 and his Ph.D. from the same university in 1977.

== Career ==
Grijalva joined the University of California, Los Angeles (UCLA) as a research associate from 1980 to 1981. He assumed the role of assistant professor in 1982 and later became an associate professor in 1986. In 1993, he was appointed professor at UCLA, a position he held until his retirement in 2017. His administrative roles at UCLA included working as interim chair of the César Chávez Center for Interdisciplinary Instruction in Chicana and Chicano Studies in 1994 and as associate dean in the Division of Honors and Undergraduate Programs from 1991 to 1996. Additionally, from 2007 to 2017 and again from 2019 to 2020, he was associate dean of the UCLA Graduate Division. He is an emeritus professor of Psychology and Neuroscience at UCLA, and is a member of the university's Brain Research Institute.

== Research ==
Grijalva's research has examined the neural mechanisms connecting feeding behavior, stress, and digestive function, with a focus on the hypothalamus and related brain regions. Through animal studies, he showed that damage to specific areas of the hypothalamus could cause gastric ulcers and other disturbances in digestion, demonstrating a link between brain activity and gastrointestinal processes. His experiments indicated that factors such as diet and insulin levels influence the development of gastric lesions. He identified the ventromedial hypothalamus as an inhibitory center for gastric activity, while the medial amygdala appeared to enhance acid secretion.

Grijalva also found that hormone responses, such as gastrin release, were centrally mediated and that the hypothalamus and limbic system contribute to the cephalic phase of digestion, which is activated by sensory cues. In addition to his work on gastric function, he investigated dopaminergic pathways and observed changes in neurotransmitter levels following neural stimulation or damage. In studies related to stress and eating disorders, he demonstrated that thermal treatment increased survival in animal models of activity-based anorexia, showing that exposure to heat shortly before a moribund state improved both the likelihood and duration of survival.

== Awards ==
- 2005 – Distinguished Teaching Award, UCLA
- 2012 – Diversity, Equity and Inclusion Award, UCLA Academic Senate

== Selected articles ==
- Lindholm, Ernest; Shumway, Gary S.; Grijalva, Carlos V.; Schallert, Timothy; Ruppel, Michael (1975). "Gastric pathology produced by hypothalamic lesions in rats". Physiology & Behavior. 14 (2): 165–169. doi:10.1016/0031-9384(75)90161-4.
- Grijalva, Carlos V.; Lindholm, Ernest; Novin, Donald (1980). "Physiological and morphological changes in the gastrointestinal tract induced by hypothalamic intervention: An overview". Brain Research Bulletin. 5 (Supplement 1): 19–31. doi:10.1016/0361-9230(80)90299-3. PMID 6992945.
- Shimizu, Nobuaki; Oomura, Yutaka; Novin, Donald; Grijalva, Carlos V.; Cooper, Peter H. (1983). "Functional correlations between lateral hypothalamic glucose-sensitive neurons and hepatic portal glucose-sensitive units in rat". Brain Research. 265 (1): 49–54. doi:10.1016/0006-8993(83)91332-X.
- Bermúdez-Rattoni, Federico; Grijalva, Carlos V.; Kiefer, Stephen W.; Garcia, John (1986). "Flavor-illness aversions: The role of the amygdala in the acquisition of taste-potentiated odor aversions". Physiology & Behavior. 38 (4): 503–508. doi:10.1016/0031-9384(86)90417-8. PMID 3823162.
- Grijalva, Carlos V; Novin, Donald (1990). "The role of the hypothalamus and dorsal vagal complex in gastrointestinal function and pathophysiology". Annals of the New York Academy of Sciences. 597 (1): 207–222. Bibcode:1990NYASA.597..207G. doi:10.1111/j.1749-6632.1990.tb16169.x. PMID 2167033.
