= Anne Silverman =

American biomechanical engineer

Anne Katherine Silverman is an American biomechanical engineer whose research focuses on the mechanics of walking, and the design and analysis of prosthetics for prosthetics for amputees. She is Rowlinson Associate Professor of Mechanical Engineering at the Colorado School of Mines, where she heads the Functional Biomechanics Laboratory, and is a co-PI of the NSF Integrative Movement Sciences Institute.

== Education and career ==
Silverman is originally from Des Moines, Iowa, but moved to Ahwatukee, Arizona as a child, and graduated from Mountain Pointe High School in Ahwatukee in 2001. She majored in mechanical engineering as an undergraduate at Arizona State University, graduating summa cum laude in 2005. She continued her studies at the University of Texas at Austin, earning a master's degree in 2007 before completing her Ph.D. there. Her 2010 doctoral dissertation, Compensatory Mechanisms in Below-Knee Amputee Walking and Their Effects on Knee Joint Loading, Metabolic Cost and Angular Momentum, was supervised by Rick Neptune.

She joined the Colorado School of Mines in 2011.

== Recognition ==
Silverman was named an ASME Fellow in 2020.
