= Angela Bryan =

Social psychologist

- Occupations: Professor of Psychology and Neuroscience
- Awards: 2006 APA Award for Distinguished Scientific Early Career Contribution to Psychology (Health Psychology)

Academic background
- Education: UCLA (BA) Arizona State University (MA, PhD)

Angela Denise Bryan is a social psychologist known for her research on HIV/STD prevention, healthy eating habits, and use of legalized cannabis. She is Professor of Psychology and Neuroscience at the University of Colorado Boulder where she co-directs the Center for Health and Neuroscience, Genes, and Environment.

Bryan received the 2006 American Psychological Association Award for Distinguished Scientific Early Career Contribution to Psychology for her studies in health psychology that used "social psychology theory to understand dynamics of unhealthy behavior and [ ] used that knowledge to design, implement, and evaluate effective, theory-based interventions to change unhealthy behavior."

== Biography ==
Bryan was born at Emory University Hospital in Atlanta, Georgia in 1970. She completed her bachelor's degree at the University of California, Los Angeles in 1992, graduating with highest honors in psychology. At UCLA, Bryan's Interests in the social psychology of health behavior and the social implications of condom use, in particular, were sparked by her honors advisor, Barry Collins.

Bryan continued her education at Arizona State University where she completed her PhD in social psychology with a quantitative emphasis in 1997. Bryan's doctoral research on the design, implementation, and evaluation of an intervention aimed at promoting condom use among college women was funded by a National Science Foundation fellowship. Her dissertation was titled "Psychosocial and contextual determinants of condom use among incarcerated adolescents" and completed under the supervision of Leona Aiken. Bryan continued her training as a postdoctoral research associate at Center for HIV/Health Intervention and Promotion (CHIP) in the Department of Psychology at the University of Connecticut.

Bryan joined the faculty of the University of Colorado at Boulder in 1999, where she expanded her research program to include studies of physical exercise. She is a member of the University of Colorado Cancer Center, a faculty fellow in the Institute of Cognitive Science at University of Colorado at Boulder and a member of the faculty of the Anschutz School of Medicine at the University of Colorado Denver.

Bryan's work on alcohol use and HIV risk has been funded through grants from the National Institute on Alcohol Abuse and Alcoholism. Her work on exercise, DNA methylation, and cancer risk has been funded by the National Cancer Institute. Her work on anti-inflammatory properties of cannabis is funded by the National Institute on Drug Abuse.

== Research ==
Bryan's research applies a biopsychosocial model of health behavior to a variety of topics including HIV/STD prevention, cannabis use, and exercise. In her HIV and STD prevention work, she has examined the influence of a situational variable—alcohol use during sexual activity—as a factor impacting condom use among at-risk young people. In an initial study, Bryan and her colleagues found that alcohol use was unrelated to condom use in males but was strongly and negatively associated with condom use among females. Bryan was interested in testing a higher risk population and decided to focus on criminally involved adolescents. In comparison to other adolescents in the general population, adolescents involved with the criminal justice system tend to be younger at the age of first sexual intercourse, and have more sex partners, lower rates of condom use, and higher rates of unintended pregnancy, HIV, and STDs. In this high-risk population, Bryan and her colleagues failed to find evidence that alcohol use influenced adolescents' intentions, attitudes, and behaviors around condom use.

Another line of work has explored effects of cannabis on motor functions. Legalization of cannabis has led to increased rates of driving under the influence. Although numerous studies indicate that cannabis impairs psychomotor and neurocognitive functions that can affect driving ability, determination of driving risk is complicated by the extent to which cannabis users develop tolerance to THC. In her study, Bryan and her colleagues used a mobile app to assess the psychomotor and cognitive functioning of frequent cannabis users immediately and one hour after engaging in cannabis use. They found clear evidence of psychomotor impairments immediately after cannabis use, but found that the impairments decreased significantly one hour after use.

Bryan's research on cannabis is not easily obtainable because Marijuana remains fully illegal at the federal level, and strict federal access policies tie the hands of researchers Bryan hopes to start filling the research gap on the topic as it gains popularity. In order for Bryan to get much needed data on the topic, she is not able to be present during participants consumption. The only way she can study effects is by using a mobile lab and asking participants to come outside to the van for tests of how its active ingredients, called cannabinoids, have affected them. The van is helping to facilitate several studies; among them are the effects of various cannabis products on anxiety, pain, inflammation, sleep, health and mood. Bryan hopes to study cannabis and metabolism, including its effects on the body's response to insulin.

In other notable work, Bryan and her collaborators surveyed cannabis users living in states with full legal access to find out whether cannabis use shortly before and/or after exercise affects enjoyment of and motivation to exercise. The researchers were specifically interested in comparing users who consumed cannabis shortly before or after exercise (co-users) with those who did not. They designed a simple questionnaire that asked people general questions about themselves, their marijuana use, and working out. Almost 82% of participants reported that they used cannabis around the time of their workouts. These individuals tended to be younger and more often male than those who did not use marijuana in conjunction with exercise. After controlling for these differences, co-users reported engaging in more minutes of exercise per week than non-users, while also reporting greater enjoyment of exercise and increased motivation to exercise. The study did not look at which kind of cannabis (edibles, smoked flower, etc.) people use alongside exercise, however, more research is already in the works at CU Boulder, comparing the activity levels of older adults who use cannabis with those who do not.

Bryan's interest in life-style research led her into studies of the effects incentives might have on healthy eating. Her team had participants record their stress levels and the number of fruit and vegetable servings they ate each day for three weeks. One group received a dollar each time they ate a serving of fruit or vegetables, the other did not. On days when subjects reported feeling stressed, those who were being paid maintained their intake while those who weren't ate fewer servings of fruits and vegetables. Participants who received cash incentives maintained their daily fruit and vegetable consumption, even when stressed. Her studies suggest that incentives may be a novel method for buffering against the negative effect of daily stress on eating a healthy diet.

== Representative publications ==
- Bryan, A. D., Aiken, L. S., & West, S. G. (1996). Increasing condom use: evaluation of a theory-based intervention to prevent sexually transmitted diseases in young women. Health Psychology, 15 (5), 371–382.
- Bryan, A. D., Aiken, L. S., & West, S. G. (1997). Young women's condom use: The influence of acceptance of sexuality, control over the sexual encounter, and perceived susceptibility to common STDs. Health Psychology, 16 (5), 468–479.
- Bryan, A., Rocheleau, C. A., Robbins, R. N., & Hutchinson, K. E. (2005). Condom use among high-risk adolescents: testing the influence of alcohol use on the relationship of cognitive correlates of behavior. Health Psychology, 24(2), 133–142.
- Kwan, B. M., & Bryan, A. D. (2010). Affective response to exercise as a component of exercise motivation: Attitudes, norms, self-efficacy, and temporal stability of intentions. Psychology of Sport and Exercise, 11 (1), 71–79.
- Robbins, R. N., & Bryan, A. (2004). Relationships between future orientation, impulsive sensation seeking, and risk behavior among adjudicated adolescents. Journal of Adolescent Research, 19(4), 428–445.
