= Robert Rennaker =

American neural engineer

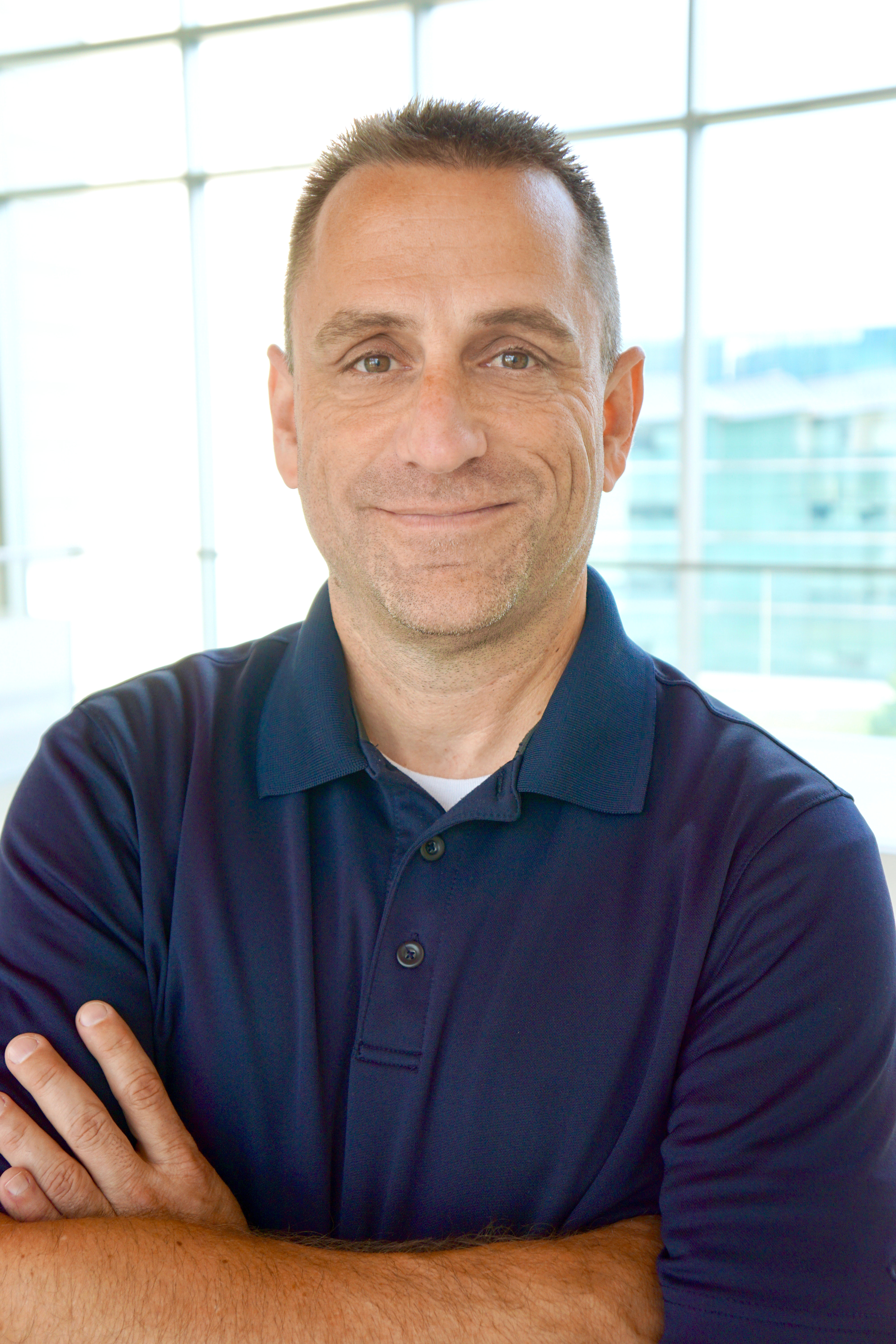
- Education: University of Central Florida; Arizona State University
- Scientific career
- Fields: Neural engineering
- Workplaces: University of Texas at Dallas

Robert LeMoine Rennaker II is an American neural engineer. He is a full professor of neuroscience and holds the Texas Instruments distinguished chair in bioengineering University of Texas at Dallas as of January 2015.

Rennaker served in the United States Marine Corps from 1988 to 1993 at the Marine Corps Air Station New River. He completed an A.A. in electrical engineering at the University of Central Florida in 1995. Rennaker earned a B.S.E. (1997), M.S. (2001) and Ph.D. (2002) in bioengineering from Arizona State University. His dissertation was titled Learning-induced auditory cortical plasticity. His doctoral advisor was Daryl R. Kipke.

He was the head of the Department of Bioengineering from 2013-October 2018 at the University of Texas at Dallas. He is the founding director of the Texas Biomedical Device Center, which specializes in the development of Targeted Plasticity Therapy (vagus nerve stimulation paired with rehabilitation) to improve neurological impairments such as spinal cord injury, tinnitus, and stroke.
