= Huan Liu =

Chinese computer scientist

Huan Liu (Chinese: 刘欢; born 1 June 1958) is a Shanghai-born Chinese computer scientist.

== Education and teaching career ==
Liu studied computer science and engineering at Shanghai Jiao Tong University in 1983, and specialized in computer science while completing his master's and doctoral degrees at the University of Southern California in 1985 and 1989, respectively. Liu began his teaching career in the 1990s at the National University of Singapore, and joined the Arizona State University faculty in 2000.

== Honors ==
Liu was named a fellow of the Institute of Electrical and Electronics Engineers (IEEE) in 2012 for his contributions to feature selection in data mining and knowledge discovery. He was elected as an ACM Fellow in 2018 for "contributions in feature selection for data mining and knowledge discovery and in social computing" and AAAI Fellow in 2019. In 2022, Huan Liu was named as a Regents Professor, the highest faculty honor awarded at Arizona State University.

== Publications ==
=== Books ===
- Liu H, Motoda H. Feature selection for knowledge discovery and data mining. Springer Science & Business Media; 1998
- Liu H, Motoda H, editors. Computational methods of feature selection. CRC Press; 2007
- Liu, Huan, and Hiroshi Motoda. Instance Selection and Construction for Data Mining. New York: Springer, 2011.
- Liu, Huan, John J. Salerno, and Michael J. Young.eds. Social Computing, Behavioral Modeling, and Prediction. New York: Springer, 2011.
- Liu, Huan, and Zheng Alan Zhao. Spectral Feature Selection for Data Mining. Taylor & Francis. 2020.

=== Most cited articles ===
- Liu H, Yu L. Toward integrating feature selection algorithms for classification and clustering. IEEE Transactions on knowledge and data engineering. 2005 Mar 7;17(4):491-502. (Cited 3157 times, according to Google Scholar)
- Yu L, Liu H. Feature selection for high-dimensional data: A fast correlation-based filter solution. In Proceedings of the 20th international conference on machine learning (ICML-03) 2003 (pp. 856–863) (Cited 2796 times, according to Google Scholar.)
- Dash, Manoranjan, and Huan Liu. "Feature selection for classification." Intelligent data analysis 1, no. 1-4 (1997): 131-156. (Cited 4224 times, according to Google Scholar.)
- Yu L, Liu H. Efficient feature selection via analysis of relevance and redundancy. The Journal of Machine Learning Research. 2004 Dec 1;5:1205-24. (Cited 2344 times, according to Google Scholar.)
- Shu K, Sliva A, Wang S, Tang J, Liu H. Fake news detection on social media: A data mining perspective. ACM SIGKDD explorations newsletter. 2017 Sep 1;19(1):22-36. (Cited 1486 times, according to Google Scholar.)
