= Larry Lake (engineer) =

American engineer

Larry W. Lake is the Shahid and Sharon Ullah Endowed Chair in petroleum engineering at the University of Texas at Austin. He has served on the faculty of the Hildebrand Department of Petroleum and Geosystems Engineering since 1978. He obtained a B.S.E. from Arizona State University and a Ph.D. from Rice University, both in chemical engineering. He is a world-famous expert in reservoir engineering, geochemistry, fluid flow in porous media and enhanced oil recovery.

Larry was elected a member of the National Academy of Engineering in 1997 for contributions to quantitative reservoir description and enhanced oil recovery.

== Honors ==
- SPE Honorary Member, 2006-present.
- University of Texas Joe J. King Award for professional service, 2004.
- SPE DeGoyer Award for distinguished service, 2003.
- SPE Distinguished Lecturer, 1994, 2003.
- Texas Society of Professional Engineers Dream Team, 2001.
- SPE Distinguished Member, 1996, 2000.
- SPE Distinguished Service Award, 2000.
- Society of Petroleum Engineering/Department of Energy Improved Oil Recovery Symposium, IOR Pioneer, 2000.
- Claude and Billie Hocott Award, College of Engineering, 1999.
- National Academy of Engineering, 1997.

== Books ==
Lake is the author of the handbook Petroleum Engineering Handbook

Lake is the coauthor of the textbooks Statistics for Petroleum Engineers and Geoscientists, Geochemistry and Fluid Flow and A Generalized Approach to Primary Hydrocarbon Recovery.

Lake is an editor with M. Walsh of the handbook A Generalized Approach To Primary Hydrocarbon Recovery Of Petroleum Exploration & Production, Volume 4 and with T. C. Wesson of Reservoir Characterization II: Conference Proceedings.
