= Ana Kupresanin =

Croatian-American statistician

- Born: Ana Maria Kuprešanin; Croatia
- Citizenship: Croatian, American
- Education: University of Zagreb (BS); University of Pittsburgh (MS); Arizona State University (PhD)
- Notable work: Statistical Computing in C++ and R (2011)
- Awards: Fellow of the American Statistical Association (2024); Distinguished Achievement Award (ASA SDNS, 2025)
- Scientific career
- Fields: Statistics, Data Science
- Workplaces: Lawrence Berkeley National Laboratory; Lawrence Livermore National Laboratory

Ana Maria Kuprešanin is a Croatian-American statistician, the division director for scientific data at the Lawrence Berkeley National Laboratory.

== Education and career ==
After a bachelor's degree in mathematics at the University of Zagreb in Croatia, Kupresanin moved to the US for graduate study in statistics. She earned a master's degree at the University of Pittsburgh, and completed a Ph.D. in 2009 at Arizona State University.

After completing her Ph.D., she became a statistician at the Lawrence Livermore National Laboratory, modeling "problems in diverse fields such as climate modeling, nuclear forensics, stockpile stewardship, and uncertainty quantification". At Lawrence Livermore, she became associate director of the Center for Applied Scientific Computing before moving to the Lawrence Berkeley National Laboratory in 2023 as division director for the Scientific Data Division.

== Book ==
Kupresanin is a coauthor, with Randall L. Eubank, of the book Statistical Computing in C++ and R (CRC Press, 2011).

== Recognition ==
Kupresanin was elected as a Fellow of the American Statistical Association in 2024.
