= Diann Brei =

American mechanical engineer

Diann Erbschloe Brei is an American mechanical engineer whose research focuses on smart materials and piezoelectric actuators. She is a professor of mechanical engineering at the University of Michigan.

== Education and career ==
Brei is the daughter of Richard "Ross" Erbschloe (1925–2005), an aircraft pilot for the US Air Force who later became a founding faculty member of the statistics department at the United States Air Force Academy and the Arizona Commissioner for Postsecondary Education. She majored in computer systems engineering at Arizona State University, graduating in 1988, and continued at Arizona State for a Ph.D. in mechanical engineering, which she completed in 1993. Her dissertation, The Development of a Polymeric Piezoelectric Bimorph Microactuator Based Macroactuator for an Artificial Hand, was primarily advised by James Blechschmidt, but lists Joseph Davidson as its official doctoral supervisor.

She joined the University of Michigan faculty in 1994, and in 2018 was named chair of the university's program in Integrative Systems + Design. She also co-directs the Collaborative Research Laboratories, a joint research program of the university with General Motors.

== Recognition ==
Brei was named as an ASME Fellow in 2011, "for her pioneering work and impact in the field of adaptive materials-based actuators and systems". She was the 2018 winner of the ASME Adaptive Structures and Material Systems Award, the 2019 winner of the SPIE Smart Structures and Materials Lifetime Achievement Award, and the 2022 winner of the ASME Machine Design Award, "for outstanding contributions in novel device design and for supporting engineering science, as well as for mentoring and building communities in the field of smart materials and structures". She became the first woman to win the award since it was founded in 1958.
