= Tsong Yueh Chen =

Most prolific author in metamorphic testing

- Occupation: Professor of Software Engineering
- Known for: Metamorphic testing
- Awards: ACM SIGSOFT outstanding research award IEEE Fellow

Academic background
- Education: The University of Hong Kong (BSc, MPhil); Imperial College London (MSc); University of Melbourne
- Doctoral advisor: Jean-Louis Lassez

Academic work
- Discipline: Software Engineering
- Institutions: Swinburne University of Technology, Melbourne, Australia

Tsong Yueh Chen (Chinese: 陳宗岳) is an Australian academic at the Swinburne University of Technology who is a professor and researcher in program testing and debugging. He is ranked internationally as the most prolific author in metamorphic testing.

Chen received the B.Sc and M.Phil from The University of Hong Kong, the M.Sc and DIC from Imperial College London, and the PhD from The University of Melbourne under the supervision of Jean-Louis Lassez. He has an h-index of 64.

In 2021, Chen et al. were selected as the Grand Champion of the Most Influential Paper Award by the Journal of Systems and Software for their 2010 paper.

In January 2024, Chen was selected for the ACM SIGSOFT Outstanding Research Award 2024 “for contributions to software testing through the invention and development of metamorphic testing”. This award is presented to individual(s) who have made significant and lasting research contributions to the theory or practice of software engineering. As tokens of recognition, Chen was invited to give a keynote speech at the International Conference on Software Engineering in April 2024, and was interviewed by ACM SIGSOFT Software Engineering Notes after his presentation.

In December 2024, IEEE announced the election of Tsong Yueh Chen as an IEEE Fellow in the class of 2025 “for contributions to software testing through the invention of metamorphic testing and adaptive random testing”. Only three software engineers were elected as IEEE Fellows in the same year.

In July 2026, Chen was honoured by ACM SIGSOFT as one of the “eighty members recognized for lasting contributions to software engineering”. He was inducted into the “Inaugural Class of the ACM SIGSOFT Software Engineering Academy”. Selected members in this first cohort include Lionel Briand, Lori Clarke, Erich Gamma, David Garlan, Carlo Ghezzi, David Harel, Gerard Holzmann, Daniel Jackson, Jeff Kramer, Nancy Leveson, Gail Murphy, Leon J. Osterweil, David Parnas, Mary Shaw, Axel van Lamsweerde, John Vlissides, Elaine J. Weyuker, Jeannette Wing, and Alexander Wolf.

== Selected publications ==
- Tsong Yueh Chen; T.H. Tse (2021). "New visions on metamorphic testing after a quarter of a century of inception". Ideas, Visions and Reflections Track, Proceedings of the ACM Joint European Software Engineering Conference and Symposium on Foundations of Software Engineering (ESEC/FSE '21). ACM, New York, NY, USA. pp. 1487–1490. doi:10.1145/3468264.3473136. ISBN 978-1-4503-8562-6.
- Tsong Yueh Chen; Fei-Ching Kuo; Huai Liu; Pak-Lok Poon; Dave Towey; T.H. Tse; Zhi Quan Zhou (2018). "Metamorphic testing: A review of challenges and opportunities" (PDF). ACM Computing Surveys. 51 (1): 1–27. doi:10.1145/3143561.
- Zhi Quan Zhou; Shaowen Xiang; Tsong Yueh Chen (2015). "Metamorphic testing for software quality assessment: A study of search engines". IEEE Transactions on Software Engineering. 42 (3): 264–284. doi:10.1109/TSE.2015.2478001.
- Huai Liu; Fei-Ching Kuo; Dave Towey; Tsong Yueh Chen (2013). "How effectively does metamorphic testing alleviate the oracle problem?" (PDF). IEEE Transactions on Software Engineering. 40 (1): 4–22. doi:10.1109/TSE.2013.46.
- Xiaoyuan Xie; Tsong Yueh Chen; Fei-Ching Kuo; Baowen Xu (2013). "A theoretical analysis of the risk evaluation formulas for spectrum-based fault localization". ACM Transactions on Software Engineering and Methodology. 22 (4): 1–40. doi:10.1145/2522920.2522924. hdl:1959.3/367111.
- Tsong Yueh Chen; T.H. Tse; Zhi Quan Zhou (2010). "Semi-proving: An integrated method for program proving, testing, and debugging". IEEE Transactions on Software Engineering. 37 (1): 109–125. doi:10.1109/TSE.2010.23. hdl:1959.3/84879..
- Tsong Yueh Chen; Fei-Ching Kuo; Robert G. Merkel; T.H. Tse (2010). "Adaptive random testing: The ART of test case diversity". Journal of Systems and Software. 83 (1): 60–66. doi:10.1016/j.jss.2009.02.022. hdl:1959.3/53402.
- Tsong Yueh Chen; Robert Merkel (2008). "An upper bound on software testing effectiveness". ACM Transactions on Software Engineering and Methodology. 17 (3): 16:1–16:27. doi:10.1145/1363102.1363107.
- Huo Yan Chen; T.H. Tse; Tsong Yueh Chen (2001). "TACCLE: a methodology for object-oriented software testing at the class and cluster levels". ACM Transactions on Software Engineering and Methodology. 10 (1): 56–109. doi:10.1145/366378.366380. hdl:1959.3/1735.
- Tsong Yueh Chen; Yuen-Tak Yu (1996). "On the expected number of failures detected by subdomain testing and random testing". IEEE Transactions on Software Engineering. 22 (2): 109–119. doi:10.1109/32.485221.
