= SIGSOFT =

ACM's Special Interest Group on Software Engineering

ACM SIGSOFT
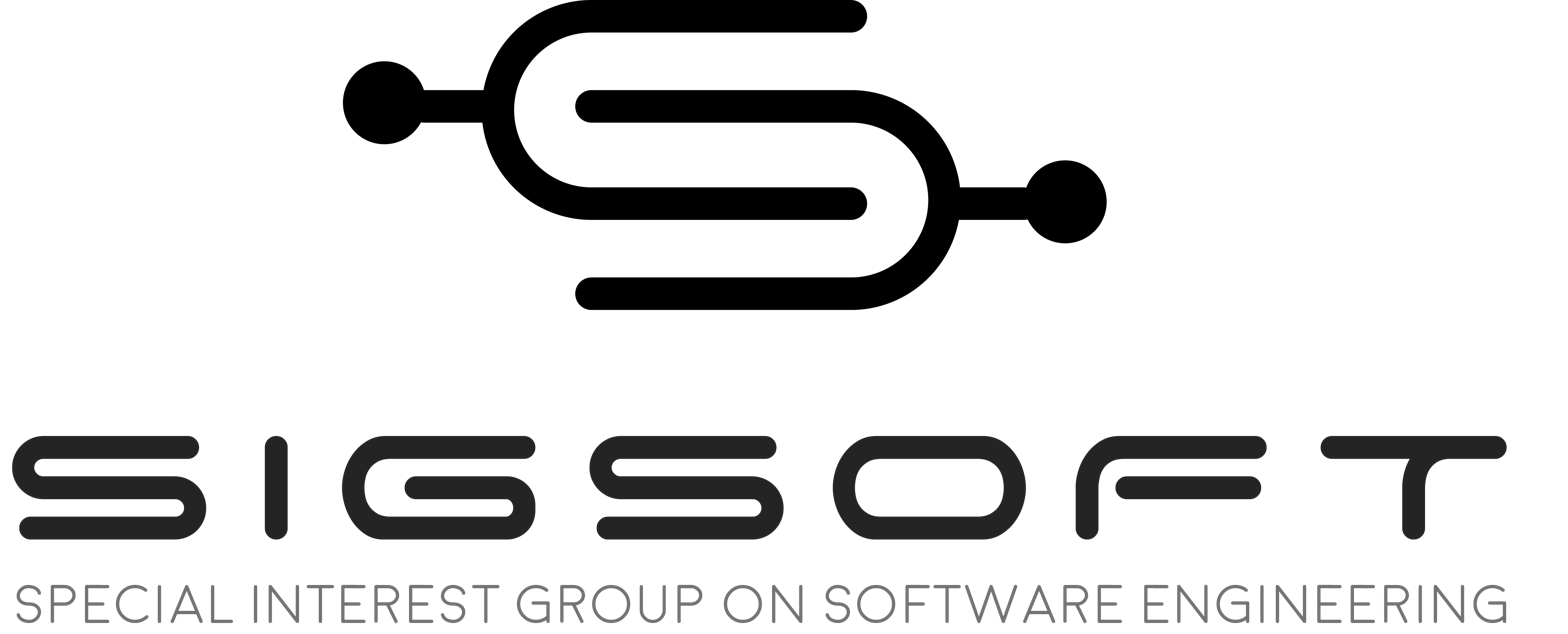
- Formation: 1976
- Products: Software development
- Key people: Executive Committee
- Website: www.sigsoft.org

The Special Interest Group on Software Engineering (SIGSOFT) is a special interest group organized by the Association for Computing Machinery (ACM) that provides a forum for computing professionals from industry, government, and academia to examine principles, practices, and new research results in software engineering.

SIGSOFT was officially formed in 1976 as the Special Interest Committee on Software Engineering (SICSOFT) by Tony Wasserman and R. Stockton Gaines, and converted to SIGSOFT in 1977.

SIGSOFT focuses on issues related to all aspects of software development and maintenance, with emphasis on requirements, specification and design, software architecture, validation, verification, debugging, software safety, mining software repositories, software processes, software management, measurement, user interfaces, configuration management, software engineering environments, AI for software engineering, and CASE tools.

SIGSOFT (co-)sponsors conferences and symposia including the International Conference on Software Engineering (ICSE), the ACM International Conference on the Foundations of Software Engineering (FSE) and other events.

SIGSOFT publishes the informal bimonthly newsletter Software Engineering Notes (SEN) newsletter with papers, reports and other material related to the cost-effective, timely development and maintenance of high-quality software.

== SIGSOFT History ==
The term "Software Engineering" was used as the theme of the first NATO Software Engineering Conference in 1968, recognizing the need for systematic approaches to software development. SIGSOFT was officially established in 1976, evolving from advocacy efforts beginning in 1973. The organization has been instrumental in establishing the academic discipline of software engineering and fostering the growth of the software engineering research community worldwide.

=== Founding and early years (1975–1979) ===
- 1973: Tony Wasserman wrote to Peter J. Denning (then ACM President) advocating the formation of a dedicated ACM special interest group (initially framed around programming / programming methodology).
- 1975: Tony Wasserman and Stockton Gaines drafted a petition supporting an ACM Special Interest Committee on Software Engineering; an organizational meeting was held at the International Conference on Reliable Software in April in Los Angeles (≈80 attendees). This conference is often referred to as ICSE-0. Jean Sammet (ACM President) supported the formation of SICSOFT.
- 1976: SICSOFT was officially approved (often cited as SIGSOFT’s birth). Initial officers included Thomas B. Steel, Jr. (initial chair), Tony Wasserman (chair), Susan L. Gerhart (vice chair), Peter A. Freeman (secretary/treasurer), and Peter G. Neumann (newsletter editor). Major publications launched included SIGSOFT Software Engineering Notes (newsletter editor: Peter G. Neumann).
- 1977: Successful conversion from SICSOFT to SIGSOFT (effective July 1, 1977), approved by the ACM SIG/SIC Board.
- 1979: ICSE 1979 is noted as the first ICSE co-sponsored by SIGSOFT, chaired by Friedrich (Fritz) L. Bauer with program chairs Manny M. Lehman and Leon G. Stucki.

=== Building a conference ecosystem (1980s–1990s) ===
- 1980: SIGSOFT established formal guidelines for organizing both SIGSOFT symposia and ICSE conferences.
- 1981: The first SIGSOFT Software Engineering Symposium (Tool and Methodology Evaluation) was held (general chair William Riddle, program chair Victor Basili).
- 1986–1988: A testing-focused meeting lineage developed (including early workshops such as the 1978 testing workshop chaired by Ed Miller), and SIGSOFT expanded its conference footprint; TOSEM was approved by ACM in 1988.
- 1992: ACM Transactions on Software Engineering and Methodology (TOSEM) published its first issue (first Editor-in-Chief: W. Richards Adrion).
- 1993: The first SIGSOFT FSE symposium was held (general chair Barry Boehm, program chair David Notkin), cementing FSE as a flagship SIGSOFT venue. It has been established as a continuation of the series of ACM SIGSOFT Symposia on Software Development Environments (SDE), which were held from 1984-1992 and were co-sponsored with SIGPLAN initially.
- 1995: SIGSOFT established the Conference Attendance Program for Students (CAPS) to support student travel and participation.
- 1999: Alexander L. Wolf (ACM SIGSOFT Chair), Mehdi Jazayeri (ESEC Steering Committee Chair), Patricia Ryan (ACM Chief Operating Officer), and Roger Johnson (President of Council of European Professional Informatics Societies) signed a Joint Sponsorship Agreement that established the ESEC-FSE series.

=== Modernization and growth (2000s–2020s) ===
- 2001: The SIGSOFT Impact Project started during the 2001–2005 executive committee led by Alexander L. Wolf (chair) and Mary Jean Harrold (vice chair).

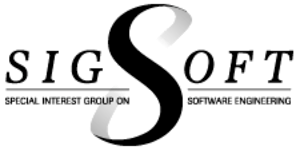
The original SIGSOFT logo first appeared in 2008.

- 2008: The original SIGSOFT logo first appeared in 2008. It was replaced in January 2019 with the current logo.

- 2009: Revised SIGSOFT bylaws were approved (including longer leadership terms and increased at-large representation). Leadership at the time included David S. Rosenblum (chair) and Matthew B. Dwyer (vice chair), with Will Tracz as newsletter editor and Tao Xie as history liaison.
- 2015: Matt Dwyer (EiC of IEEE TSE) and David S. Rosenblum (EiC of ACM TOSEM) launched the journal-first initiative for software engineering at ICSE 2015 in May in Florence.
- 2010s–2020s: SIGSOFT continued stewarding and co-sponsoring major venues such as ICSE, FSE/ESEC-FSE, and ISSTA, reflecting the field’s global growth (e.g., ICSE leadership included chairs such as Martin Glinz for ICSE 2012 in Zürich and David Notkin for ICSE 2013).

== SIGSOFT Executive Committee ==
=== Officers ===
- Chair: Marsha Chechik — University of Toronto (Canada)
- Vice Chair: Massimiliano Di Penta — University of Sannio (Italy)
- Most Recent Past Chair: Thomas Zimmermann — Donald Bren School of Information and Computer Science, University of California, Irvine (USA)

=== At-Large Members ===
- Claire Le Goues (SIGSOFT Awards) — Carnegie Mellon University (USA)
- David Lo (Student Mentorships and Support; Secretary–Treasurer) — Singapore Management University (Singapore)
- Emerson Murphy-Hill (Director of Communication)
- Kelly Blincoe (Memberships and Community) — University of Auckland (New Zealand)

=== Liaison Members ===
- International Liaison: S.C. Cheung — Department of Computer Science and Engineering, Hong Kong University of Science and Technology (Hong Kong)
- iSoft Liaison: Atul Kumar — IBM Research India
- cSoft Liaison: Minghui Zhou — Peking University (China)
- Special Projects Liaison: Will Tracz — Lockheed Martin Fellow Emeritus (retired), Owego, NY (USA)
- Industry Co-Liaison: Nachi Nagappan — Meta (USA)
- Industry Co-Liaison: Xin Xia — Huawei Technologies (China)
- Climate Change Liaison: Rick Kazman — University of Hawaii (USA)

=== Diversity, Equity, and Inclusion Liaisons ===
- Jo Atlee — University of Waterloo (Canada)
- Kelly Blincoe — University of Auckland (New Zealand)
- Alexander Serebrenik — Eindhoven University of Technology (Netherlands)

=== Program and Communications Roles ===
- Research Highlight Chair: Martin Robillard — McGill University (Canada)
- Social Media Chair: Judith Michael — RWTH Aachen University (Germany)
- Digital Learning Chair: Sridhar Chimalakonda — Indian Institute of Technology Tirupati (India)
- Digital Learning Co-Chair: Andrew Begel — Carnegie Mellon University (USA)

=== Student Support Programs ===
- CAPS Co-Chair: Istvan David — McMaster University (Canada)
- CAPS Co-Chair: Zhiyuan Wan — Zhejiang University (China)
- CAPS Co-Chair: Fabio Palomba — University of Salerno (Italy)

=== CARES Program ===
- CARES Co-Chair: Joanne Atlee — University of Waterloo (Canada)
- CARES Co-Chair: Alexander Serebrenik — Eindhoven University of Technology (Netherlands)
- CARES Co-Chair: Kelly Blincoe — University of Auckland (New Zealand)
- CARES Co-Chair: Federica Sarro — University College London (United Kingdom)

=== Publications ===
- Newsletter Editor: Jacopo Soldani

=== Past SIGSOFT Executive Committee ===
Years	Chair	Vice Chair	Secretary/Treasurer	At-Large Members	Notes
1976–1978 (SICSOFT)	Tony Wasserman (after Thomas B. Steel resigned)	Susan L. Gerhart	Peter A. Freeman	–	SICSOFT officially approved (birth of SIGSOFT).
1978–1979	Tony Wasserman	Susan Owicki	Norman F. Schneidewind	Richard Fairley, Seymour Jeffery, Anita Jones, John B. Goodenough	Newsletter Editor: Peter G. Neumann
1979–1981	Marvin Zelkowitz	William Riddle	Norman F. Schneidewind	Richard Fairley, Seymour Jeffery, Anita Jones, John B. Goodenough	
1981–1983	William Riddle	W. Richards Adrion	John D. Gannon	Herb Chang, Nico Habermann, Tony Wasserman	
1983–1985	William Riddle	W. Richards Adrion	Pamela Zave	Larry Druffel, John Musa, Tony Wasserman	
1985–1987	W. Richards Adrion	Pamela Zave	Lori Clarke	John Musa, Tony Wasserman, Marvin Zelkowitz	
1987–1989	W. Richards Adrion	Richard N. Taylor	Lori Clarke	Peter Henderson, Nancy Leveson, Tony Wasserman	
1989–1993	Richard N. Taylor	Lori Clarke	Elaine Weyuker (1989–92), David Notkin (1992–93)	Nancy Leveson, Dewayne Perry, Tony Wasserman	
1993–1997	Lori Clarke	David Notkin	–	–	Newsletter Editor: Will Tracz
1997–2001	David Notkin	Alexander L. Wolf	Mary Jean Harrold	Wilhelm Schäfer, David Garlan, Martin Griss, Tony Wasserman, Kokichi Futatsugi	
2001–2005	Alexander L. Wolf	Mary Jean Harrold	William G. Griswold	Laura Dillon, David Rosenblum, Jeff Magee	
2005–2009	William G. Griswold	David S. Rosenblum	Matthew Dwyer	Paola Inverardi, Andreas Zeller, Laura Dillon	
2009–2012	David S. Rosenblum	Matthew B. Dwyer	Laura Dillon	Laura Dillon, Jo Atlee, Gail Murphy, Bashar Nuseibeh (resigned, replaced by Mark Grechanik)	
2012–2015	Will Tracz	Laura Dillon	Gail C. Murphy	Frank Tip, Frances Paulisch, Willem C. Visser	Newsletter Editor: Mike Wing
2015–2018	Nenad Medvidovic	Jane Cleland-Huang	Elisabetta Di Nitto	Harald C. Gall, Mark Grechanik, Willem C. Visser	Newsletter Editor: John Georas
2018–2021	Thomas Zimmermann	Elisabetta Di Nitto	Robert Dyer	Marija Mikic, Gregg E. Rothermel, Sebastian Uchitel	Newsletter Editor: Dietmar Pfahl
2021–2024	Thomas Zimmermann	Marsha Chechik	Lin Tan	Cristian Cadar, David Lo, Martin Robillard	2022 Newsletter Editor: Jacopo Soldani

== SIGSOFT Publication Venues ==
=== Journals ===
Software Engineering Journals
Acronym	Name	Started	Status	Within SIGSOFT
SEN	Software Engineering Notes	1976	Active	1976
TOSEM	ACM Transactions on Software Engineering and Methodology	1992	Active	1992
PACMSE	Proceedings of the ACM on Software Engineering	2024	Active	2024

=== Conferences ===
Software Engineering Conferences
Acronym	Name	Started	Status	Within SIGSOFT
AIWare	ACM International Conference on AI-Powered Software	2024	Active	2024
Internetware	Asia-Pacific Symposium on Internetware	2009	Active	2009
ISSTA	International Symposium on Software Testing and Analysis	1986	Active	1989
AST	International Conference on Automation of Software Test	2006	Active	2006
CAIN	International Conference on AI Engineering – Software Engineering for AI	2022	Active	2022
FORGE	International Conference on AI Foundation Models and Software Engineering	2024	Active	2024
FormaliSE	International Conference on Formal Methods in Software Engineering	2013	Active	2013
ICPC	International Conference on Program Comprehension	1992	Active	2019
MOBILESoft	International Conference on Mobile Software Engineering and Systems	2014	Active	2014
MSR	International Conference on Mining Software Repositories	2004	Active	2004
SEAMS	International Symposium on Software Engineering for Adaptive and Self-Managing Systems	2006	Active	2006
Techdebt	International Conference on Technical Debt	2018	Active	2018
SAM	System Analysis and Modelling Conference	1998	Active	1998
ASE	International Conference on Automated Software Engineering	1986	Active	1997
DEBS	International Conference on Distributed and Event-based Systems	2007	Active	2007
EDTconf	International Conference on Engineering Digital Twins	2024	Active	2024
ESEM	International Symposium on Empirical Software Engineering and Measurement	2007	Active	2007
ESEC	European Software Engineering Conference	1987	Merged with FSE between 1997 and 2023	1997
FSE	International Conference on the Foundations of Software Engineering	1993	Active	1993
ICGSE	International Conference on Global Software Engineering	2006	Ended (Merged w/ ICSSP)	2006
ICPE	International Conference on Performance Engineering	2010	Active	2010
ICSE	International Conference on Software Engineering	1975	Active	1976
ICSSP	International Conference on Software and System Processes	2007	Active	2007
MODELS	International Conference on Model Driven Engineering Languages and Systems	1998	Active	1998
SPLC	International Systems and Software Product Line Conference	2000	Active	2000

== SIGSOFT Awards ==
=== SIGSOFT Outstanding Research Award ===
The SIGSOFT Outstanding Research Award is presented annually to an individual or individuals who have made significant and lasting research contributions to the theory or practice of software engineering.

- 1997 – Barry Boehm
- 1998 – David Parnas
- 1999 – Harlan Mills
- 1999 – Niklaus Wirth
- 2000 – Victor Basili
- 2001 – Michael Jackson
- 2002 – Gerard Holzmann
- 2003 – Leon J. Osterweil
- 2004 – Nancy Leveson
- 2005 – Jeff Kramer and Jeff Magee
- 2006 – David Harel
- 2007 – Elaine J. Weyuker
- 2008 – Axel van Lamsweerde
- 2009 – Richard N. Taylor
- 2010 – Erich Gamma, Richard Helm, Ralph Johnson, and John Vlissides
- 2011 – David Garlan and Mary Shaw
- 2012 – Lori Clarke
- 2013 – David Notkin
- 2014 – Alexander Wolf
- 2015 – Carlo Ghezzi
- 2016 – James Herbsleb
- 2017 – Daniel Jackson
- 2018 – Andreas Zeller
- 2019 – Mark Harman (computer scientist)
- 2020 – Michael D. Ernst
- 2021 – Prem Devanbu
- 2022 – Lionel Briand
- 2023 – Gail Murphy
- 2024 – Tsong Yueh Chen
- 2025 – Martin Rinard
- 2026 – Tao Xie

=== SIGSOFT Distinguished Service Award ===
The SIGSOFT Distinguished Service Award is presented annually to individuals who have contributed dedicated and important service to the software engineering community.

- 1995 – Tony Wasserman
- 1996 – W. Richards Adrion
- 1997 – Peter G. Neumann
- 1998 – Bruce Barnes
- 1999 – Bill Riddle
- 2000 – Marvin Zelkowitz
- 2001 – Kouichi Kishida
- 2002 – Lori Clarke
- 2003 – Axel van Lamsweerde
- 2004 – Will Tracz
- 2005 – Richard N. Taylor
- 2006 – Carlo Ghezzi
- 2007 – David Notkin
- 2008 – John C. Knight
- 2009 – Stuart Zweben
- 2010 – Mary Lou Soffa
- 2011 – Jeff Kramer
- 2012 – Alexander Wolf
- 2013 – Wilhelm Schäfer
- 2014 – Leon J. Osterweil
- 2015 – Bashar Nuseibeh
- 2016 – Martin Glinz
- 2017 – Laura Dillon
- 2018 – David S. Rosenblum
- 2019 – Matt Dwyer
- 2020 – Nenad Medvidović
- 2021 – Tao Xie
- 2022 – Joanne M. Atlee
- 2023 – John Grundy
- 2024 – Massimiliano Di Penta
- 2025 – Mauro Pezzé
- 2026 – Thomas Zimmermann

=== SIGSOFT Influential Educator Award ===
The SIGSOFT Influential Educator Award is presented annually to an educator or educators who have made significant contributions to, and impact on, the field of software engineering with his or her accomplishments as a teacher, mentor, researcher (in education or learning), author, and/or policy maker.

- 2009 – Laurie Williams (software engineer)
- 2009 – Nico Habermann
- 2010 – Leon J. Osterweil
- 2011 – Ian Sommerville (software engineer)
- 2012 – Mehdi Jazayeri
- 2012 – David Notkin
- 2013 – Tony Wasserman
- 2014 – Mary Lou Soffa
- 2015 – Barbara Ryder
- 2016 – Lori Pollock
- 2017 – Bertrand Meyer
- 2018 – Shriram Krishnamurthi
- 2019 – Ahmed E. Hassan
- 2020 – Greg Wilson
- 2021 – Katsuro Inoue
- 2022 – Miryung Kim
- 2023 – Tao Xie
- 2024 – Martin Robillard
- 2025 – Andreas Zeller
- 2026 – Daniela Damian

=== SIGSOFT Early Career Award ===
The SIGSOFT Early Career Award is presented to an individual or individuals who have made outstanding contributions in the area of software engineering as an early career investigator.

- 2017 – Christian Bird
- 2018 – Gabriele Bavota
- 2019 – Jeff Huang
- 2020 – Claire Le Goues
- 2021 – Lingming Zhang
- 2022 – Xin Xia
- 2023 – Chunyang Chen
- 2024 – Kevin Moran
- 2025 – Jie Zhang
- 2026 – Eunsuk Kang
- 2026 – Sen Chen

=== SIGSOFT Outstanding Doctoral Dissertation Award ===
The SIGSOFT Outstanding Doctoral Dissertation Award is presented annually to the authors of outstanding doctoral dissertations in the area of Software Engineering.

- 2012 – Mark Gabel
- 2013 – Jeff Huang
- 2014 – Nicolas Mangano
- 2015 – Muath Alkhalaf
- 2016 – Milos Gligoric
- 2017 – Srdan Krstic
- 2018 – Fan Long
- 2019 – Sergey Mechtaev
- 2020 – Rachel Tzoref-Brill
- 2021 – August Shi
- 2022 – Wing Lam
- 2023 – David Shriver
- 2024 – Bianca Trinkenreich
- 2025 – Elizabeth Dinella
- 2025 – Jialun Cao
- 2026 – Zhou Yang

=== SIGSOFT Impact Paper Award ===
The SIGSOFT Impact Paper Award is presented annually to the author(s) of a paper presented at a SIGSOFT-sponsored or co-sponsored conference held at least 11 years prior to the award year.

- 2008 – Rosenblum, D. S. and Wolf, A. L. A design framework for Internet-scale event observation and notification.
- 2009 – Andreas Zeller. Yesterday, my program worked. Today, it does not. Why?.
- 2010 – James C. Corbett, Matthew B. Dwyer, John Hatcliff, Shawn Laubach, Corina S. Pasareanu, Robby, and Hongjun Zheng. Bandera: Extracting finite-state models from Java source code.
- 2011 – Luca de Alfaro and Thomas A. Henzinger. Interface automata.
- 2012 – Chandrasekhar Boyapati, Sarfraz Khurshid, and Darko Marinov. Korat: Automated testing based on Java predicates.
- 2013 – Michael Ernst, Jake Cockrell, Bill Griswold, and David Notkin. Dynamically discovering likely program invariants to support program evolution.
- 2014 – Barbara Kitchenham, Tore Dybå, and Magne Jørgensen. Evidence-based software engineering.
- 2015 – James A. Jones, Mary Jean Harrold, and John Stasko. Visualization of test information to assist fault localization.
- 2016 – Daniel Jackson and Mandana Vaziri. Finding bugs with a constraint solver.
- 2017 – Roy T. Fielding and Richard N. Taylor. Principled design of the modern web architecture.
- 2018 – Lingxiao Jiang, Ghassan Misherghi, Zhendong Su, and Stéphane Glondu. DECKARD: Scalable and accurate tree-based detection of code clones.
- 2019 – Koushik Sen, Darko Marinov, and Gul Agha. CUTE: A concolic unit testing engine for C.
- 2020 – Willem Visser, Klaus Havelund, Guillaume Brat, and SeungJoon Park. Model checking programs.
- 2021 – Matthew B. Dwyer, George S. Avrunin, and James C. Corbett. Patterns of property specifications for finite-state verification.
- 2022 – Mik Kersten and Gail Murphy. Using task context to improve programmer productivity.
- 2023 – Gordon Fraser and Andrea Arcuri. EvoSuite: Automatic test suite generation for object-oriented software.
- 2024 – Marcel Bruch, Martin Monperrus, and Mira Mezini. Learning from examples to improve code completion systems.
- 2025 – Alberto Bacchelli and Christian Bird. Expectations, outcomes, and challenges of modern code review.
- 2026 – Jacek Śliwerski, Thomas Zimmermann, and Andreas Zeller. When do changes induce fixes?.

=== SIGSOFT - SIGBED Frank Anger Award ===
In the spirit of Frank’s work and legacy, the Executive Committees of SIGBED and SIGSOFT, with support from the US National Science Foundation, have established a student travel award in his name. The award provides $2000 stipends for two students, one named by each SIG, to cover travel expenses to attend the flagship conference of the other SIG. The award is meant to improve the mutual awareness of the two research communities to the opportunities and challenges emerging in complementary research areas.

- 2006 – Cesar Sanchez and Bernhard Egger (SIGBED)
- 2007 – Stefan Henkler and Chunyang Ye (SIGSOFT)
- 2008 – Basil Becker (SIGSOFT)
- 2008 – Georgios Fainekos (SIGBED)
- 2011 – Aldeida Aleti (SIGSOFT)
- 2011 – Miroslav Pajic (SIGBED)
- 2012 – Indranil Saha (SIGBED)
- 2013 – Reinhard Schneider (SIGSOFT)
- 2017 – Ivan Ruchkin (SIGSOFT)
- 2019 – Jacob Krüger (SIGSOFT)
- 2020 – Sumaya Almanee (SIGSOFT)
- 2020 – Adeola Bannis (SIGBED)
- 2021 – Sumaya Almanee (SIGSOFT)
- 2021 – Akshay Gadre (SIGBED)
- 2022 – Claudio Mandrioli (SIGBED)
- 2024 – Max Camillo Eisele (SIGSOFT)
- 2025 – Liu Wang (SIGSOFT)
- 2026 – Federico Formica (SIGSOFT)

=== SIGSOFT Software Engineering Academy ===
In 2026 this award was introduced and it honors and recognizes individuals who have made significant, cumulative contributions to the development of the field of software engineering. Inductees to the SIGSOFT Software Engineering Academy are the principal leaders in software engineering, whose efforts have shaped the discipline and/or industry through significant research, innovation, and/or service.

Each year, a small cohort is elected to the SIGSOFT Software Engineering Academy. Inductees is celebrated at the ICSE conference in their year of induction. The award is appropriate for ACM because it will be an opportunity to recognize the software engineering community and its leaders who have shaped the field.

The SIGSOFT Software Engineering Academy is modelled after the SIGCHI, SIGIR, and SIGGRAPH Academies and will follow a similar structure; however, it is focussed on a different research field with relatively little overlap to the SIGCHI, SIGIR, or SIGGRAPH communities.
