= Massimiliano Di Penta =

Italian computer scientist

- Education: University of Sannio
- Scientific career
- Fields: Software engineering
- Workplaces: University of Sannio

Massimiliano Di Penta is an Italian computer scientist and full professor of engineering at the University of Sannio. He is known for his work in empirical software engineering, software maintenance, and mining software repositories, and received the 2024 ACM SIGSOFT Distinguished Service Award.

== Education and career ==
Di Penta studied computer engineering at the University of Sannio, earning his laurea (master's degree) in 1999 and his Ph.D. in 2003. Remaining at Sannio, he joined the faculty as an assistant professor in 2004, became an associate professor in 2011, and was appointed full professor in 2019.

Outside his university role, Di Penta has been active in organizing major software engineering conferences and editing academic journals. He co-chaired the program committees for the International Conference on Automated Software Engineering (ASE) in 2017, the ACM Joint European Software Engineering Conference and Symposium on the Foundations of Software Engineering (ESEC/FSE) in 2021, and the International Conference on Software Engineering (ICSE) in 2023. He also serves as a co-editor-in-chief of Wiley's Journal of Software: Evolution and Process and has served as vice chair of the ACM SIGSOFT Executive Committee.

== Research and recognition ==
Di Penta's research focuses on empirical studies of software evolution, search-based software engineering, and software testing, particularly through the analysis of data from version control systems and issue trackers. Among his works is a 2020 replication study with Fiorella Zampetti and Gabriele Bavota examining how source-code refactoring correlates with the introduction of software bugs. A 2019 bibliometric study in the Journal of Systems and Software ranked him as the second most prolific experienced software engineering researcher between 2010 and 2017.

In 2019, Di Penta received the Most Influential Paper Award at the IEEE International Conference on Software Analysis, Evolution and Reengineering (SANER). He has also received multiple ACM SIGSOFT Distinguished Paper Awards, and in 2024 was awarded the ACM SIGSOFT Distinguished Service Award.
