= Carnegie Mellon University Masters in Software Engineering =

The Master of Software Engineering (MSE) at Carnegie Mellon University is a master's program founded in 1989 focusing on software engineering practice as a joint effort between Carnegie Mellon's School of Computer Science and the Software Engineering Institute. Its studio project was a capstone project that accounts for 40 percent of the course units.

== History ==
Centered around software engineering workshops conducted at the Software Engineering Institute, the degree program's original concepts and curriculum were developed.

=== Program directors ===
- 1989–1991, Software Engineering Institute
- 1992–1999, Mary Shaw
- 1996–2001, James E. Tomayko
- 1999–2001, James E. Tomayko
- 2001–2008, Mel Rosso-Llopart
- 2002–2016, David Garlan
- 2016–2019, Anthony Lattanze
- 2019–present, Travis Breaux

== Curriculum ==
The MSE program began as a joint effort of the School of Computer Science and the Software Engineering Institute. The degree program has a 16-month curriculum. Applicants to the program must have no less than two years of relevant industry experience, with an average of five years of experience.

The MSE curriculum has three basic components:

1. Core Courses – emphasis on design, analysis, and the management of large-scale software systems.
2. Studio Project – a capstone project that spans the duration of the program for students to implement a software project for an external client. Students work as members of a team under the guidance of faculty advisors (mentors).
3. Electives – to study in selected areas.

== Notable faculty ==
- David Garlan
- Mary Shaw
- Nancy Mead
