= Andreas Zeller =

German computer scientist

- Born: 28 October 1965 (age 60); Hanau
- Education: TU Braunschweig
- Awards: ACM Fellow; IEEE Fellow; IFIP Fellow; ACM SIGSOFT Outstanding Research Award; IEEE Harlan D. Mills Award; ACM SIGSOFT Influential Educator Award
- Scientific career
- Fields: Software engineering, debugging, software testing
- Workplaces: Saarland University; CISPA Helmholtz Center for Information Security

Andreas Zeller is a German computer scientist, faculty at the CISPA Helmholtz Center for Information Security, and Professor of Software Engineering at Saarland University.

Zeller works on automatic approaches to find, explain, and fix defects in software. Specifically, he is known for foundational contributions to software testing, debugging and mining software repositories.

== Life and career ==
Zeller was born in Hanau, Germany on 28 October 1965. After earning his diploma in Computer Science from TU Darmstadt, he moved to Braunschweig to work as a research and teaching assistant where he received his PhD in Computer Science from TU Braunschweig in 1997. The title of his PhD thesis was "Configuration Management with Version Sets". He continued as Postdoctoral Research Fellow at TU Braunschweig until 1999 when he moved to Passau University. In 2001, he accepted an offer as Professor at Saarland University where he held the Chair of Software Engineering between 2003 and 2018. Since 2019 he is also a faculty at the CISPA Helmholtz Center for Information Security. Meanwhile, he has held visiting appointments at Microsoft Research (2011, 2009, 2005), ETH Zurich (2007), and the University of Washington (2005).

Andreas Zeller has held various leadership positions in the international software engineering research community. He chaired the program committees of the most important international conferences in software engineering: the ACM/IEEE International Conference on Software Engineering (ICSE) in 2022, the IEEE International Conference on Software Testing and Verification (ICST) in 2020, the ACM/IEEE International Conference on Automated Software Engineering (ASE) in 2013, the European Conference on Software Engineering / ACM SIGSOFT Foundations of Software Engineering (ESEC/FSE) in 2011, and the ACM SIGSOFT International Symposium on Software Testing and Analysis (ISSTA) in 2008. Moreover, Zeller was the General Chair for the IEEE European Symposium on Security and Privacy (EuroS&P) and the ACM SIGSOFT International Symposium on Software Testing and Analysis (ISSTA), both in 2016.

== Awards and recognition ==
Andreas Zeller has received multiple lifetime achievement awards. In 2010, he was inducted as ACM Fellow for "contributions to automated debugging and mining software archives". In 2018, he received the ACM SIGSOFT Outstanding Research Award for "outstanding seminal contributions in automated debugging and mining software repositories". In 2024, he was inducted into the Academia Europaea. In 2025, he received the ACM SIGSOFT Influential Educator Award for "significant contributions and important innovations in automated software engineering education". In 2026, he was inducted as IEEE Fellow for "contributions to analyzing software and its development process". In 2026, he received the IEEE Harlan D. Mills Award for "sustained contributions to software debugging, program analysis, mining software repositories, and automated test generation".

In 2011, Zeller was awarded an ERC Advanced Grant of 2.3 million euros, the European Union's highest endowed grant, for the project "SPECMATE: Specification Mining and Testing". In 2023, he was awarded a second ERC Advanced Grant of 2.5 million euros for his project "S3 - Semantics of Software Systems".

Andreas Zeller has received several ten-year impact awards, where a conference chooses the most influential paper from the conference instance ten years prior. In 2009, he received ACM SIGSOFT 10-Year Impact Award for his single-author paper "Yesterday, my program worked. Today, it does not. Why?" which introduced the concept of Delta Debugging. In 2014, he won the 10-Year Most Influential Paper Award at the ACM/IEEE International Conference of Software Engineering (ICSE) jointly with Thomas Zimmermann, Peter Weißgerber, and Stephan Diehl for their paper on "Mining Software Histories to Guide Software Changes" which introduced the concept of mining software repositories.

In 2015, Zeller won the 10-Year Most Influential Paper Award at the IEEE/ACM International Conference on Mining Software Repositories (MSR) jointly with his co-authors Jacek Sliwerski and Thomas Zimmermann for the paper "When do Changes induce Fixes?" which introduced an algorithm to identify the bug-inducing commit that is now widely known as the SZZ algorithm. In 2017, he won another MSR 10-Year Most Influential Paper Award jointly with Cathrin Weiß, Rahul Premraj, and Thomas Zimmermann for their paper on "How Long Will It Take to Fix This Bug?" which introduced the first highly accurate bug fixing effort estimation method. In 2020, he won the Impact Paper Award at the International Symposium of Software Testing and Analysis (ISSTA) for their paper on "Mutation-Driven Generation of Unit Tests and Oracles" jointly with Gordon Fraser.
