= RISKS Digest =

Periodical published by a Committee of the ACM

The RISKS Digest or Forum On Risks to the Public in Computers and Related Systems is an online periodical published from 1985 to April 2026 by the Committee on Computers and Public Policy of the Association for Computing Machinery (ACM). The editor and moderator, prior to his death in May 2026, was Peter G. Neumann.

== Topics ==
It is a moderated forum concerned with the security and safety of computers, software, and technological systems. Security, and risk, here are taken broadly; RISKS is concerned not merely with so-called security holes in software, but with unintended consequences and hazards stemming from the design (or lack thereof) of automated systems. Other recurring subjects include cryptography and the effects of technically ill-considered public policies. RISKS also publishes announcements and Calls for Papers from various technical conferences, and technical book reviews (usually by Rob Slade, though occasionally by others).

Although RISKS is a forum of a computer science association, most contributions are readable and informative to anyone with an interest in the subject. It is heavily read by system administrators, and computer security managers, as well as computer scientists and engineers. It was an especially important source of news about computer security in the 1990s. As the largest and oldest collection of information security risks available online, researchers have analyzed the archives as a data set.

== Publication ==
Neumann established the Forum On Risks to the Public in Computers and Related Systems in 1985 at the request of the president of the ACM at the time, Adele Goldberg.

The RISKS Digest was published on a frequent but irregular schedule through the moderated Usenet newsgroup comp.risks, which exists solely to carry the Digest. It is also available via email. Summaries of the forum appear as columns edited by Neumann in the ACM SIGSOFT Software Engineering Notes (SEN) and the Communications of the ACM (CACM).

As of June 2026, the Risks Digest web archive said "I'm sad to have to tell you that Peter Neumann died on the 17th May. This website will be here as long as I am able to maintain it, but whether or not there is any future RISKS content anywhere, I cannot say."
