= ACM International Conference on the Foundations of Software Engineering =

Software engineering research conference

- Status: Active
- Genre: Academic conference
- Frequency: Annual
- Years active: 1993–present
- Inaugurated: 1993
- Organiser: ACM SIGSOFT
- Website: www.esec-fse.org

The ACM International Conference on the Foundations of Software Engineering (FSE) is an annual academic conference in software engineering. The conference has also been held under the name ACM Joint European Software Engineering Conference and Symposium on the Foundations of Software Engineering (ESEC/FSE) when organized jointly with the European Software Engineering Conference (ESEC).

According to the official conference website, FSE and ESEC/FSE were formally merged in 2017 into a single annual conference series with one steering committee. Since 2024, the official name of the series has been ACM International Conference on the Foundations of Software Engineering. Conference proceedings are published by ACM and indexed by DBLP.

== History ==
The FSE series began with FSE-1 in Los Angeles, United States, in 1993. The related European Software Engineering Conference began earlier, with ESEC 1987 in Strasbourg, France.

=== Relationship between FSE and ESEC ===
FSE and ESEC originated as related but distinct conference series in software engineering. FSE was associated with the ACM SIGSOFT Symposium on the Foundations of Software Engineering, while ESEC was the European Software Engineering Conference. In several years, the two communities organized a joint event under the name ESEC/FSE, formally the ACM Joint European Software Engineering Conference and Symposium on the Foundations of Software Engineering.

Before 2017, ESEC/FSE was held every two years and alternated with SIGSOFT FSE. According to ACM SIGSOFT, FSE and ESEC/FSE officially merged in 2017 into a single annual conference with one steering committee. The official FSE website similarly states that the merger formalized a practice that had already been informally adopted in previous years.

From 2017 to 2023, the annual conference was generally held under the ESEC/FSE name. Since 2024, the official name of the annual conference series has been the ACM International Conference on the Foundations of Software Engineering, abbreviated FSE. DBLP lists the European Software Engineering Conference as discontinued as of 2023, with FSE as its successor from 2024 onward.

== Organization ==
The FSE Steering Committee is responsible for guiding the conference series, including long-term policies, conference scope, selection of officers, location policies, reviewing standards, and scientific criteria.

== Awards ==
In 2018, the FSE Steering Committee introduced a Test of Time Award. The award is given annually to recognize influential papers published ten years earlier in the conference series.

== Rankings and indexing ==
FSE is indexed by DBLP as a software engineering conference series. In the ICORE/CORE conference rankings, FSE is listed as an A* conference in the software engineering field.

== Editions ==
The following table lists previous FSE, ESEC/FSE, and ESEC editions according to the official FSE past-events page and DBLP records.

Previous editions
Year	Edition	Location	Series
2028	FSE 2028	Milan, Italy	FSE
2027	FSE 2027	Shenzhen, China	FSE
2026	FSE 2026	Montreal, Canada	FSE
2025	FSE 2025	Trondheim, Norway	FSE
2024	FSE 2024	Porto de Galinhas, Brazil	FSE
2023	ESEC/FSE 2023	San Francisco, United States	ESEC/FSE
2022	ESEC/FSE 2022	Singapore	ESEC/FSE
2021	ESEC/FSE 2021	Athens, Greece	ESEC/FSE
2020	ESEC/FSE 2020	Sacramento, California, United States	ESEC/FSE
2019	ESEC/FSE 2019	Tallinn, Estonia	ESEC/FSE
2018	ESEC/FSE 2018	Lake Buena Vista, Florida, United States	ESEC/FSE
2017	ESEC 2017 / FSE-25	Paderborn, Germany	ESEC/FSE
2016	FSE-24	Seattle, Washington, United States	FSE
2015	ESEC 2015 / FSE-23	Bergamo, Italy	ESEC/FSE
2014	FSE-22	Hong Kong, China	FSE
2013	ESEC 2013 / FSE-21	Saint Petersburg, Russia	ESEC/FSE
2012	FSE-20	Research Triangle Park, North Carolina, United States	FSE
2011	ESEC 2011 / FSE-19	Szeged, Hungary	ESEC/FSE
2010	FSE-18	Santa Fe, New Mexico, United States	FSE
2009	ESEC 2009 / FSE-17	Amsterdam, Netherlands	ESEC/FSE
2008	FSE-16	Atlanta, Georgia, United States	FSE
2007	ESEC 2007 / FSE-15	Dubrovnik, Croatia	ESEC/FSE
2006	FSE-14	Portland, Oregon, United States	FSE
2005	ESEC 2005 / FSE-13	Lisbon, Portugal	ESEC/FSE
2004	FSE-12	Newport Beach, California, United States	FSE
2003	ESEC 2003 / FSE-11	Helsinki, Finland	ESEC/FSE
2002	FSE-10	Charleston, South Carolina, United States	FSE
2001	ESEC 2001 / FSE-9	Vienna, Austria	ESEC/FSE
2000	FSE-8	San Diego, California, United States	FSE
1999	ESEC 1999 / FSE-7	Toulouse, France	ESEC/FSE
1998	FSE-6 / ISAW-3	Lake Buena Vista, Florida, United States	FSE
1997	ESEC 1997 / FSE-5	Zurich, Switzerland	ESEC/FSE
1996	FSE-4 / ISAW-2	San Francisco, California, United States	FSE
1995	FSE-3	Washington, D.C., United States	FSE
1995	ESEC 1995	Sitges, Spain	ESEC
1994	FSE-2	New Orleans, Louisiana, United States	FSE
1993	FSE-1	Los Angeles, California, United States	FSE
1993	ESEC 1993	Garmisch-Partenkirchen, Germany	ESEC
1991	ESEC 1991	Milan, Italy	ESEC
1989	ESEC 1989	Warwick, Coventry, United Kingdom	ESEC
1987	ESEC 1987	Strasbourg, France	ESEC

== See also ==
- Software engineering
- Association for Computing Machinery
- ACM SIGSOFT
- International Conference on Software Engineering
- International Conference on Automated Software Engineering
