= Will Tracz =

American computer scientist and software engineer

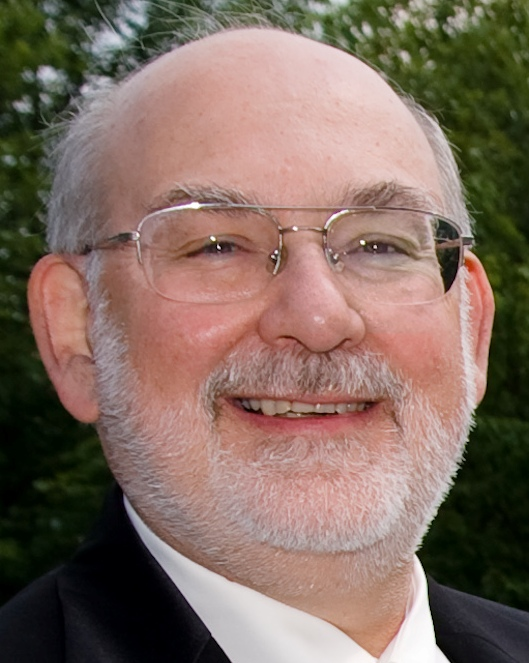
- Education: Stanford University
- Known for: Confessions of a Used Program Salesman, software reuse, domain-specific software architecture
- Awards: ACM Distinguished Member (2009), ACM SIGSOFT Distinguished Service Award (2004)
- Scientific career
- Fields: Software engineering, Software architecture, Software reuse
- Workplaces: Lockheed Martin
- Thesis: Parameterized Programming in LILEANNA (1997)
- Website: www.tracz.org

Will Tracz is an American computer scientist and software engineer known for his work in software reuse, software architecture, and software engineering professional service. He is a retired Lockheed Martin Fellow Emeritus, a former chair of ACM SIGSOFT, and a recipient of the ACM SIGSOFT Distinguished Service Award.

== Education ==
Tracz completed a Ph.D. in electrical engineering at Stanford University in 1997. His dissertation was titled Parameterized Programming in LILEANNA.

== Career ==
Tracz worked at Lockheed Martin, where he became a Lockheed Martin Fellow Emeritus. In 2009, the Association for Computing Machinery named him an ACM Distinguished Engineer, a category of ACM Distinguished Member, while he was affiliated with Lockheed Martin IS&GS.

He has authored and edited publications on software reuse and software engineering. His 1995 book, Confessions of a Used Program Salesman: Institutionalizing Software Reuse, was published by Addison-Wesley. He also edited Software Reuse: Emerging Technology, published by the IEEE Computer Society Press.

In 1997, Tracz was granted a United States patent for a “System for identifying and linking domain information”.

== Professional service ==
Tracz served as chair of ACM SIGSOFT from 2012 to 2015. He has also served as Special Projects Liaison on the ACM SIGSOFT Executive Committee.

He was the general chair of the 24th International Conference on Software Engineering in 2002, held in Orlando, Florida.

Tracz was also general chair of the 20th ACM SIGSOFT International Symposium on the Foundations of Software Engineering in 2012.

ACM SIGSOFT annual reports identify Tracz as editor of Software Engineering Notes.

== Awards and recognition ==
In 2004, Tracz received the ACM SIGSOFT Distinguished Service Award.

In 2009, ACM named Tracz an ACM Distinguished Engineer. His ACM awards profile lists him as an ACM Distinguished Member in 2009 and an ACM Senior Member in 2008.

== Selected bibliography ==
- Tracz, Will. Software Reuse: Emerging Technology. IEEE Computer Society Press, 1990. ISBN 978-0818608469.
- Tracz, Will. Confessions of a Used Program Salesman: Institutionalizing Software Reuse. Addison-Wesley, 1995. ISBN 978-0201633696.
