= Chechik =

Chechik is a surname. Notable people with the surname include:

- Adriana Chechik (born 1991), American pornographic actress and streamer
- Jeremiah S. Chechik, Canadian film director and actor
- Marsha Chechik, Canadian computer scientist
