= Tao Xie =

Computer scientist

Tao Xie is a computer scientist specializing in software engineering, with a focus on software testing, program analysis, software analytics, software security, and intelligent software engineering.

== Academic background ==
Tao Xie earned his Ph.D. in Computer Science from the University of Washington in 2005, under the supervision of Professor David Notkin. He served as an Associate Professor in the Department of Computer Science at North Carolina State University until July 2013. He then joined the Department of Computer Science at the University of Illinois at Urbana-Champaign (UIUC) as a Professor and Willett Faculty Scholar. Currently, he is a Chair Professor and Chair of the Department of Software Science and Engineering in the School of Computer Science at Peking University.

== Research contributions ==
Xie's work at the intersection of software engineering and artificial intelligence has led to advancements in intelligent software tools and educational platforms. He developed techniques to automate software testing, including test input generation, test oracles, and debugging assistance. Xie has also worked on systematic testing approaches like symbolic execution and concolic testing, which improve the thoroughness of testing processes.

== Awards and honors ==
Xie has received awards from conferences including ACM SIGSOFT and IEEE. He is an IEEE Fellow and an ACM Fellow.

- ACM Distinguished Member (2015)
- IEEE Fellow (2018)
- AAAS Fellow (2019)
- ACM Fellow (2021)

Xie has authored papers presented at premier conferences including the International Conference on Software Engineering (ICSE), the ACM SIGSOFT Symposium on the Foundations of Software Engineering (ESEC/FSE), and the International Symposium on Software Testing and Analysis (ISSTA). His work encompasses various aspects of software engineering, including automated testing, program analysis, and software security.

In addition to his research publications, Xie has held key leadership roles in organizing major conferences. He served as the Program Chair for the 2015 ACM SIGSOFT ISSTA and as the Program Co-Chair for the 2021 IEEE/ACM ICSE. Xie has served on the Steering Committee of the International Workshop on Cloud Intelligence / AIOps since 2020 in conjunction with the ICSE, ASPLOS, MLSys, and AAAI annual conferences.

Xie's contributions extend beyond conference organization to include active participation in editorial boards including Co-Editor-in-Chief of the Wiley journal of Software Testing, Verification and Reliability (STVR), Associate Editor of IEEE Transactions on Software Engineering (TSE), and the Editorial Board Member of Communications of the ACM (CACM).

== Select publications ==
- Suresh Thummalapenta, Tao Xie "Parseweb: a programmer assistant for reusing open source code on the web" (2007)
- Xiaoyin Wang, Lu Zhang, Tao Xie, John Anvik, Jiasu Sun "An approach to detecting duplicate bug reports using natural language and execution information" (2008)
- Hao Zhong, Tao Xie, Lu Zhang, Jian Pei, Hong Mei "MAPO: Mining and recommending API usage patterns" (2009)
