= Michael D. Ernst =

American computer scientist

- Education: University of Washington (PhD)
- Known for: Daikon, Dynamic invariant detection, Pluggable type systems
- Awards: ACM Fellow (2014), IEEE Fellow (2021), John Backus Award (2009)
- Scientific career
- Fields: Software engineering, Programming languages
- Workplaces: University of Washington, Massachusetts Institute of Technology, Microsoft Research

Michael D. Ernst is an American computer scientist and Susan J. Eggers Professor of Computer Science & Engineering at the University of Washington. His research focuses on software engineering, programming languages, and program analysis.

== Career ==
Ernst earned his PhD in Computer Science from the University of Washington in 2000. He previously served as a tenured professor at the Massachusetts Institute of Technology (MIT) and worked as a researcher at Microsoft Research. He has also held roles at Facebook and Amazon.

== Research ==
Ernst's research has aimed to improve reliability and security in technology. The subjects of his research include:

- Type theory and pluggable type systems
- Software testing and formal verification
- Bug prediction and program analysis
- Dynamic invariant detection

He is the primary creator of Daikon, a tool in the field of dynamic invariant detection which observes program execution to infer likely mathematical properties of the code.

== Awards and honors ==
Ernst is recognized as a highly cited researcher in software engineering. In 2013, Microsoft Academic Search ranked him #2 in the world for software engineering research contributions over the previous decade.

- ACM Fellow (2014)
- IEEE Fellow (2021)
- ACM SIGSOFT Outstanding Research Award (2020)
- CRA-E Undergraduate Research Faculty Mentoring Award (2018)
- Inaugural John Backus Award (2009)
- NSF CAREER Award (2002)

=== Impact and paper awards ===
- ICSE Most Influential Paper Award (2017)
- ACM SIGSOFT Impact Paper Award (2013)
- ISSTA Impact Awards (2018, 2019, 2024)
- FSE Most Influential Paper Award (2024)
- 9 ACM Distinguished Paper Awards (across ICSE, ESEC/FSE, and ISSTA conferences)

== Selected publications ==
- Ernst, Michael D.; Cockrell, James; Wg, William G.; Griswold, William P. (1999). "Dynamically discovering likely program invariants to support program evolution". ICSE '99: Proceedings of the 21st International Conference on Software Engineering.
- Ernst, Michael D. (2007). "The Daikon system for dynamic detection of likely invariants". Science of Computer Programming. 69 (1–3): 35–45.
