= Osterweil =

Osterweil is a surname. Notable people with the surname include:

- Leon J. Osterweil, American computer scientist

== See also ==
- PEN/Joyce Osterweil Award for Poetry, award by PEN America
