= Peter G. Neumann =

American computer scientist (1932–2026)

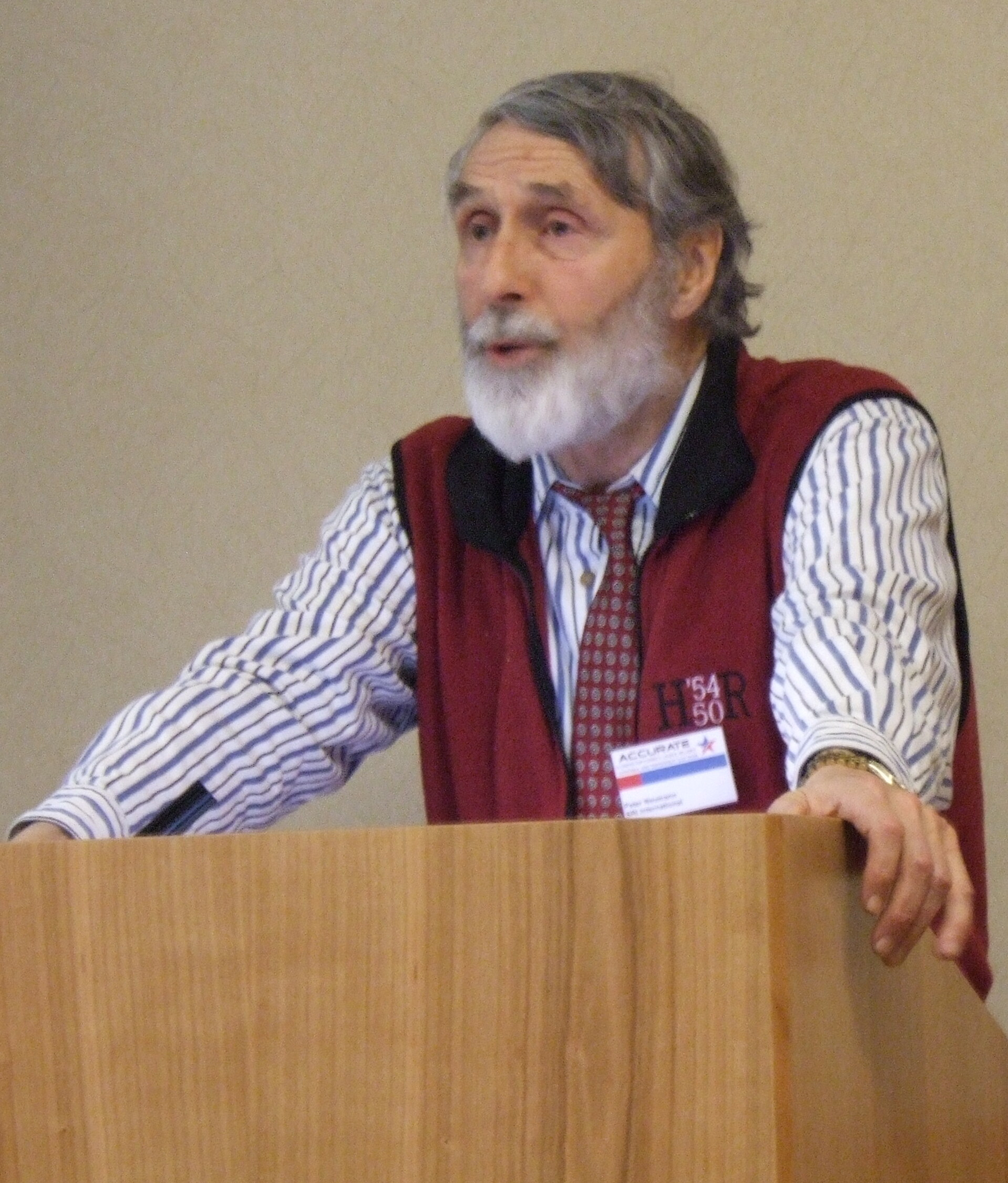
- Neumann in 2007
- Born: September 21, 1932; New York City, U.S.
- Died: May 17, 2026 (aged 93); Santa Clara, California, U.S.
- Education: Harvard University
- Known for: RISKS Digest; Multics operating system
- Spouse: Elizabeth Neumann
- Scientific career
- Fields: Computer science
- Workplaces: SRI International
- Thesis: Efficient error-limiting variable-length codes (1962)
- Doctoral advisor: Anthony Oettinger

Peter Gabriel Neumann (September 21, 1932 – May 17, 2026) was an American computer science researcher who studied how computer systems fail and advocated for the principles that make them fail less often.. Neumann worked on the Multics operating system in the 1960s, and edited the RISKS Digest columns for ACM Software Engineering Notes and Communications of the ACM. He founded ACM SIGSOFT and was a Fellow of the ACM, IEEE, and AAAS.

== Early life and education ==
Neumann was born on September 21, 1932, in Manhattan, New York, to Elsa Schmid Neumann, a mosaic artist, and Israel Ber Neumann, an art dealer.

His mother was commissioned to create a mosaic of Einstein and became friendly with him. While a student at Harvard, he had a two-hour breakfast with Albert Einstein, on 8 November 1952, discussing simplicity in design.

He held three degrees from Harvard University — an A.B. (1954) in Mathematics, and an S.M. (1955) and Ph.D. (1961) in Applied Mathematics and Science. He held a Fulbright scholarship in Germany from 1958–1960.

== Career ==
Neumann worked at Bell Labs from 1960 to 1970. He worked at SRI International in Menlo Park, California since 1971.

Before the RISKS mailing list, Neumann was known for the Provably Secure Operating System (PSOS).

Neumann worked with Dorothy E. Denning in the 1980s to develop a computer intrusion detection system known as IDES that was a model for later computer security software.

== Death ==
On May 17, 2026, Neumann died at Santa Clara Hospital due to complications arising from a recent fall. He was 93.

== Memberships and awards ==
Neumann long served as moderator of RISKS Digest and was a member of the ACCURATE project.

He was the founding editor of ACM Software Engineering Notes (SEN), and was a Fellow of the ACM.

In 2002 Neumann received the National Computer Systems Security Award from NIST and the NSA.

In 2018, Neumann received the EPIC Lifetime Achievement Award from Electronic Privacy Information Center.

== Selected publications ==
- Neumann, Peter G., Computer-Related Risks, Addison-Wesley/ACM Press, ISBN 0-201-55805-X, 1995.
