= Journal of Software: Evolution and Process =

- Discipline: Computer science, software maintenance, software evolution
- Language: English
- Edited by: Massimiliano Di Penta, Darren Dalcher, Xin Peng, and David Raffo

Publication details
- Former names: Journal of Software Maintenance: Research and Practice, Journal of Software Maintenance and Evolution: Research and Practice
- History: 1989–present
- Publisher: John Wiley & Sons
- Frequency: Monthly
- Impact factor: 1.972 (2020)

Standard abbreviations
- ISO 4: J. Softw.: Evol. Process

Indexing
- ISSN: 1532-060X (print); 2047-7481 (web)
- LCCN: 2012205429
- OCLC no.: 488593641

Links
- Journal homepage; Online access; Online archive

The Journal of Software: Evolution and Process is a peer-reviewed scientific journal covering all aspects of software development and evolution. It is published by John Wiley & Sons. The journal was established in 1989 as the Journal of Software Maintenance: Research and Practice, renamed in 2001 to Journal of Software Maintenance and Evolution: Research and Practice, and obtained its current title in 2012. The editors-in-chief are Massimiliano Di Penta, Darren Dalcher, Xin Peng, and David Raffo.

== Abstracting and indexing ==
The journal is abstracted and indexed in:

- Academic Search
- Advanced Polymers Abstracts
- Ceramic Abstracts/World Ceramic Abstracts
- Compendex
- CompuMath Citation Index
- Computer & Information Systems Abstracts
- ACM Computing Reviews
- CSA Civil Engineering Abstracts
- CSA Mechanical & Transportation Engineering Abstracts
- CSA Technology Research Database
- Current Contents/Engineering, Computing & Technology
- Inspec
- METADEX
- Science Citation Index Expanded
- Scopus

According to the Journal Citation Reports, the journal has a 2020 impact factor of 1.972, ranking it 55th out of 108 journals in the category "Computer Science, Software Engineering".
