= Gail C. Murphy =

Canadian computer scientist

Professor Gail C. Murphy Ph.D.
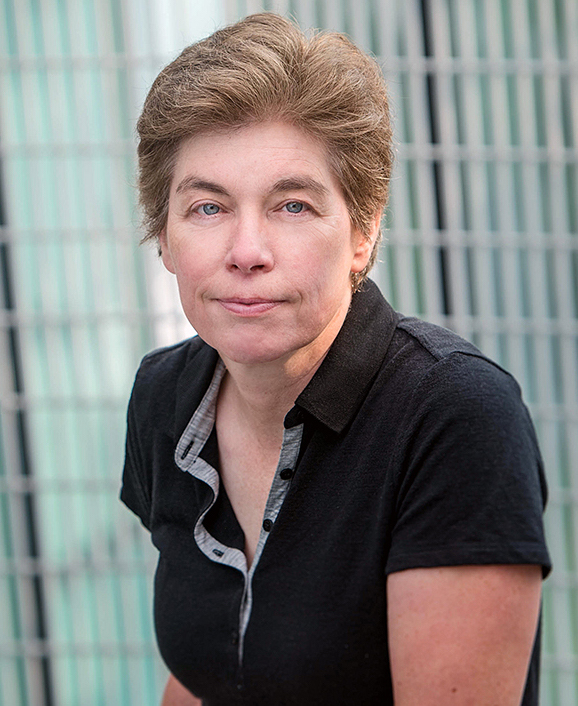
- Murphy in 2017
- Citizenship: Canadian
- Education: University of Alberta (BS 1987), University of Washington (Ph.D. 1995)
- Known for: Reflexion models, software engineering
- Awards: ACM Fellow (2017)
- Scientific career
- Fields: software engineering, computer science
- Institutions: University of British Columbia
- Thesis: Lightweight structural summarization as an aid to software evolution (1996)
- Doctoral advisor: David Notkin
- Website: blogs.ubc.ca/gailcmurphy/

Gail C. Murphy FRSC is a Canadian computer scientist who specializes in software engineering and knowledge worker productivity. Murphy is a full professor in the Department of Computer Science at the University of British Columbia, Vancouver. In 2016, she was named Associate Vice President Research pro tem and assumed the role of Vice-President, Research & Innovation on August 14, 2017. Murphy is co-founder and was Chief Scientist at Tasktop Technologies Incorporated.

== Biography ==
Murphy received her B.Sc. from the University of Alberta in 1987 and a M.S. and a Ph.D. in computer science at the University of Washington, in 1994 and 1996 respectively. Murphy has served on editorial boards for Communications of the ACM, and Institute of Electrical and Electronics Engineers Transactions on Software Engineering.

== Awards ==
- 2010: ACM Distinguished Member
- 2014: University of Washington Computer Science and Engineering Alumni Achievement Award
- 2015: Fellow of the Royal Society of Canada
- 2016: ICSE Most Influential Paper Award (10 years after publication) (co-authored with John Anvik and Lyndon Hiew)
- 2017: ACM Fellow
- 2023: ACM SIGSOFT Outstanding Research Award
