= Marvin Zelkowitz =

American computer scientist and engineer

- Born: 7 August 1945 (age 81)
- Education: Rensselaer Polytechnic Institute; Cornell University
- Known for: programming languages, software engineering
- Scientific career
- Fields: computer science
- Workplaces: U. of Maryland, College Park; UMIACS; Fraunhofer Mid-Atlantic
- Thesis: Reversible Execution as a Diagnostic Tool (1971)
- Doctoral advisor: Richard W. Conway

Marvin Victor Zelkowitz (born 7 August 1945) is an American computer scientist and engineer.

Zelkowitz earned a degree in mathematics from Rensselaer Polytechnic Institute in 1967 and a master's degree and doctorate in computer science at Cornell University in 1969 and 1971, respectively. He then taught at the University of Maryland, College Park. While holding a professorship within the Department of Computer Science and the University of Maryland Institute for Advanced Computer Studies (UMIACS), he was also affiliated with the Fraunhofer Center for Experimental Software Engineering, since renamed The Fraunhofer USA Center Mid-Atlantic (CMA). He is now Professor Emeritus, having retired in 2007.

His early research (1968-early 1980s) was in programming languages. He worked on implementation of programming language features to aid in program development and debugging as well as ways to implement tests for runtime correctness of executable code.

His later research dealt with software engineering practices by looking at developing methods for improving the process of software development.

The years 2003-2009 were devoted to applying these experimental testing results to the field of High-performance computing.

Zelkowitz served as editor of the series Advances in Computers for Academic Press (vols 41-56; 1995-2002) and later Elsevier (vols. 57-74; 2003-2008)

Since 1994, Zelkowitz has been active in scientific skepticism as Board member and at times Secretary, Treasurer, and President of the National Capital Area Skeptics. NCAS was founded in 1987 in the Washington, D.C., Maryland and Virginia area and is an advocate for science and reason, actively promoting the scientific method, rational inquiry, and education.

== Awards ==
- Charter Member, IEEE Computer Society Golden Core (1996)
- Fellow, IEEE Computer Society, for contributions towards the development of practical programming environment for effective software development (1997)
- Distinguished Service Award, ACM SigSoft (2000)

== Books ==
- PL/I Programming with PLUM (1976)
- Software Specifications: A comparison of formal methods (1979)
- Programming Languages: Design and Implementation (Third Edition) (1996)
- Foundations of Empirical Software Engineering: The Legacy of Victor R .Basili (2005)
- The Golden Age of Computer Technology: Through the Eyes of an Aging Geek (2020)

== Selected publications ==
- Interrupt Driven Programming (1971)
- Reversible Execution (1973)
- Optimization of Structured Programs (1974)
- Perspectives on software engineering (1978)
- A case study in rapid prototyping (1980)
- Implementation of language enhancements (1981)
- Software engineering practices in the United States and Japan (1984)
- A functional correctness model of program verification (1990)
- The role for executable specifications in system maintenance (1991)
- SEL's software process-improvement program (1995)
- Software Engineering technology infusion within NASA (1996)
- Experimental models for validating computer technology (1998)
- A web-based tool for data analysis and presentation (1998)
- Software process improvement in small organizations: A case study (2005)
- Understanding the high-performance computing community: A software engineer’s perspective (2008)
