= Laurie Williams (software engineer) =

American software engineer

Laurie Williams is an American software engineer known for her writings on pair programming and agile software development. She is Goodnight Distinguished University Professor in Security Sciences in the Department of Computer Science at North Carolina State University, and a co-director of the North Carolina Secure Computing Institute.

== Education and career ==
Williams graduated from Lehigh University in 1984, with a bachelor's degree in industrial engineering. After earning an M.B.A. from Duke University in 1990, she completed a Ph.D. at the University of Utah in 2000. Her dissertation, The Collaborative Software Process, was supervised by Robert R. Kessler.

She joined the North Carolina State University in 2000, and was named a distinguished professor in 2018.

== Books ==
With Robert R. Kessler, Williams is the author of the book Pair Programming Illuminated (Addison-Wesley, 2002). With Michele Marchesi, Giancarlo Succi, and James Donovan Wells, she is an author of Extreme Programming Perspectives (Addison-Wesley, 2003).

== Recognition ==
In 2009, Williams became one of the two inaugural winners of the ACM SIGSOFT Influential Educator Award, for her work on pair programming in computer science education. Two years later, Williams was selected as an ACM Distinguished Member.

In 2018, Williams was elected as a Fellow of the IEEE "for contributions to reliable and secure software engineering".
