= Dewayne E. Perry =

American engineer

Dewayne E. Perry (1940–2024) was an American engineer. He was formerly the Motorola Regents Chair at the University of Texas at Austin. He is a member of the IEEE Computer Society and SIGSOFT. He is the co-author, with Alexander L. Wolf, of the most-cited paper in software engineering since 1999.

== Personal life ==
Over the past decades, Perry and his wife, Faith, have assembled a world-class collection of medieval and Renaissance prints, etchings, woodcuts, and engravings.
