= Marsha Chechik =

Canadian computer scientist

Maria Marsha A. Chechik is a computer scientist who works in Canada as Bell University Chair in Software Engineering in the Department of Computer Science at the University of Toronto. Her research concerns software engineering, and particularly the use of formal methods to assure the safety and reliability of software in industrial and health applications. Marsha Chechik has served as vice-chair (2021-24) and chair (2024-present) of ACM SIGSOFT.

== Education and career ==
Chechik is originally from the Soviet Union. She completed a Ph.D. in computer science from the University of Maryland, College Park in 1996, with the dissertation Automatic Analysis of Consistency Between Requirements and Designs supervised by John D. Gannon.

She joined the Department of Computer Science at the University of Toronto in 1996, and added a cross appointment with the Department of Electrical and Computer Engineering in 2000. She was chair of computer science from 2019 to 2022, and acting dean of the Faculty of Information in 2022. She is also an affiliated faculty member of the Schwartz Reisman Institute.

== Recognition ==
Chechik was named as an ACM Fellow, in the 2024 class of fellows, "for contributions to formal reasoning for quality software development at scale".
