= Ahmed E. Hassan =

Canadian computer scientist

Ahmed E. Hassan is a professor at Queen's University in the Queen's School of Computing, where he leads the Software Analysis and Intelligence Lab (SAIL). He is a fellow of both the Association for Computing Machinery (ACM) and the Institute of Electrical and Electronics Engineers (IEEE). In 2023, he became the youngest recipient in the history of the Mustafa Prize, receiving the award for his contributions to software engineering.

== Education ==
Hassan received his Ph.D., MMath, and BMath degrees from the School of Computer Science at the University of Waterloo in Canada, completing his doctorate in 2005.

== Research ==
Hassan's research focuses on the intersection of intelligent systems and software engineering. His work addresses methods for developing, maintaining, and evolving large-scale software systems.

Hassan has contributed to the field of Mining Software Repositories (MSR), developing methods for extracting insights from software development data. His 2008 paper, "The Road Ahead for Mining Software Repositories," outlined key challenges and opportunities in MSR research.

His work on "FMWare" introduced software frameworks that integrate foundation models to address performance and reliability challenges in AI-driven software development.

Hassan developed the "Structured Agentic Software Engineering" (SASE) framework, which examines collaboration between intelligent agents and humans in software engineering tasks.

== Awards and recognition ==
- 2023: Mustafa Prize, for contributions to software engineering
- 2022: Fellow of the ACM
- 2019: Fellow of the IEEE
- 2017: Recognized as the world's most prolific software engineering researcher in the previous decade by the Journal of Systems and Software (Elsevier)

== Selected publications ==
- Hassan, Ahmed E. (2009). "Predicting faults using the complexity of code changes". 2009 IEEE 31st International Conference on Software Engineering. IEEE. pp. 78–88. doi:10.1109/ICSE.2009.5070510. ISBN 978-1-4244-3453-4.
