= ACM Transactions on Software Engineering and Methodology =

- Discipline: Software engineering
- Language: English
- Edited by: Abhik Roychoudhury

Publication details
- History: 1992–present
- Publisher: ACM
- Frequency: Monthly
- Open access: Yes
- Impact factor: 6.9 (2025)

Standard abbreviations
- ISO 4: ACM Trans. Softw. Eng. Methodol.

Indexing
- ISSN: 1049-331X (print); 1557-7392 (web)

Links
- Journal homepage

ACM Transactions on Software Engineering and Methodology is a monthly peer-reviewed scientific journal covering software engineering published by the Association for Computing Machinery since 1992. The editor-in-chief is Abhik Roychoudhury (National University of Singapore).

According to the Journal Citation Reports, the journal has a 2025 impact factor of 6.9 As per the latest SCIMago journal ranking (SJR), it is in the top quartile among all Computer Science Journals.

== Editor-in-chief: past and present ==
Name	Term
Abhik Roychoudhury	2025–present
Mauro Pezzè	2019–2024
David S. Rosenblum	2013–2018
David Notkin	2007–2012
Carlo Ghezzi	2001–2006
Axel van Lamsweerde	1995–2000
W. Richards Adrion	1992–1994
