= Kelly Blincoe =

American researcher

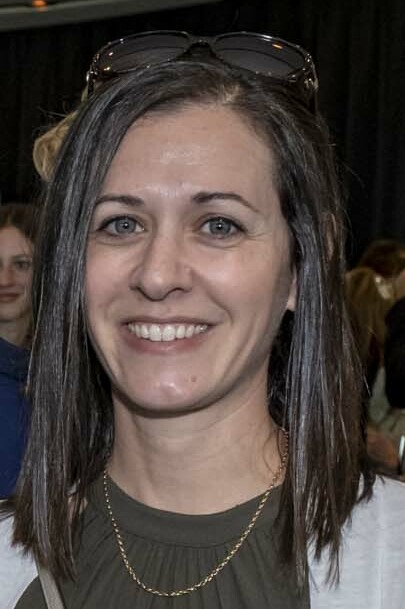
- Blincoe in 2023
- Born: USA
- Education: Drexel University
- Awards: Rutherford Discovery Fellowship (2022) & MIP Award (2024)
- Scientific career
- Fields: Software Engineering
- Workplaces: University of Auckland
- Thesis: Timely and Efficient Facilitation of Coordination of Software Developers’ Activities (2014)

Kelly Blincoe is an American academic based in New Zealand. She is an associate professor at the University of Auckland and a Rutherford Discovery Fellow for Royal Society Te Apārangi. Her research primarily focuses on software engineering, with a particular interest in software project management, developer productivity, and collaboration in software development teams. She is a senior editor for Journal of Systems and Software and an editor for IEEE Transactions on Software Engineering, and Empirical Software Engineering.

== Education and career ==
Blincoe received her Ph.D. in computer science from Drexel University, Philadelphia. Her doctoral research contributed to the understanding of software engineering processes and developer collaboration. Blincoe then joined the University of Auckland as a faculty member. Her work at the university includes teaching software engineering and conducting research in the same field. She was a principal investigator for a Marsden fund (early career) in 2020.

== Research and contributions ==
Blincoe's research interests encompass several areas within software engineering. She investigates methods to improve software project management, aiming to enhance team productivity and project outcomes. Her work also explores factors influencing developer productivity, including work environments, tools, and processes. Additionally, she studies collaboration and communication within software development teams, identifying ways to improve these interactions to boost overall team performance. Some of her selected publications include:

- Blincoe, K., Valetto, G., & Goggins, S. (2012). Proximity: A Measure to Quantify the Need for Developers’ Coordination. In Proceedings of the International Conference on Software Engineering (ICSE).
- Blincoe, K., Sheoran, J., Goggins, S., Petakovic, E., & Damian, D. (2015). Understanding the Popular Users: Following, Affiliation Influence and Leadership on GitHub. Information and Software Technology, 70, 30–39.
- Blincoe, K., Valetto, G., & Damian, D. (2014). Do all task dependencies require coordination? The role of task properties in identifying critical coordination needs in software projects. In Proceedings of the International Conference on Software Engineering (ICSE).

== Awards and recognitions ==
Blincoe was awarded the Rutherford Discovery Fellowship in 2022. She has received several best paper awards at conferences for her contributions to software engineering research. She is one of the recipient of the MIP award 2024 for a research paper presented at the MSR 2014 conference. Blincoe also collaborates with industry partners to apply her research findings to real-world software development challenges.
