= Nancy R. Mead =

American computer scientist

- Born: 1942 (age 83–84); New Jersey
- Education: New York University
- Known for: Security, Software Engineering Education
- Scientific career
- Fields: Computer Science and Software Engineering
- Workplaces: Carnegie Mellon University
- Doctoral advisor: Stanley Preiser

Nancy Rose Mead (born in 1942) is an American computer scientist. She is known for her contributions to security, software engineering education and requirements.

== Background and education ==
Mead spent her childhood in New Jersey, growing up in a 2nd generation Armenian immigrant family. She had an early interest in mathematics. This led to a mathematics major at New York University. from which she received a BA in mathematics and French (Honors) in 1963, and an MS in mathematics in 1967. Mead received her PhD in mathematics in 1983 from the Polytechnic Institute of New York (now the NYU Tandon School of Engineering). Her thesis, "Complexity Measures for System Design", was supervised by Stanley Preiser.

== Career ==
Mead spent a significant part of her career at IBM (1966–1990), in software development and management of large real-time systems, software engineering technology, and software engineering education. She was named a Senior Technical Staff Member at IBM in 1988.

Mead's research at Carnegie Mellon University's Software Engineering Institute (1990–2018) was primarily in the study of software engineering and cybersecurity engineering, particularly software and security requirements, and the development of software assurance and software engineering curricula. She was the Principal Investigator and primary developer of the SQUARE method for security requirements engineering, and led the Software Assurance Curriculum Project, which included the Master of Software Assurance Reference Curriculum recognized by IEEE and ACM. At present, her interests are in threat modelling and supply chain risk management.

== Awards and honors ==
She was named an IEEE Fellow in 2006 and an ACM Distinguished Member in 2009. The Nancy Mead Award for Excellence in Software Engineering Education, given by the IEEE Conference on Software Engineering Education & Training (CSEE&T) since 2010, is named for her in honor of her leading role in establishing that conference. She was named a Fellow of the Software Engineering Institute (SEI) in 2013. In 2015, she received the Distinguished Education Award from the IEEE Computer Society Technical Council on Software Engineering (TCSE). In 2019 she was awarded the Parnas Fellowship by Lero, the Irish Software Research Centre. In 2020 she was selected for the IEEE Distinguished Visitor Program. In 2024, she was selected for the IEEE Women in Services Computing Award with Yanchun Sun of Peking University.

== Publications ==
Mead has more than 150 publications. She has co-authored two books:

- Software Security Engineering (Addison-Wesley 2008)
- Cyber Security Engineering (Addison-Wesley 2016).

The following are a selection of her most-cited papers:

- R Wieringa, N Maiden, N Mead, C Rolland. "Requirements engineering paper classification and evaluation criteria: a proposal and a discussion", Requirements engineering 11 (1), 102-107
- NR Mead, T Stehney, "Security quality requirements engineering (SQUARE) methodology", ACM SIGSOFT Software Engineering Notes 30 (4), 1–7
- RJ Ellison, DA Fisher, RC Linger, HF Lipson, TA Longstaff, NR Mead, "Survivability: Protecting your critical systems", IEEE Internet Computing 3 (6), 55–63,
- RJ Ellison, RC Linger, T Longstaff, NR Mead, "Survivable network system analysis: A case study", IEEE software 16 (4), 70–77
