= Elaine Weyuker =

American computer scientist

Elaine J. Weyuker
- Education: Rutgers University
- Known for: Software Engineer
- Awards: Harlan D. Mills Award; ACM SIGSOFT Outstanding Research Award; ACM 2010 Presidential Award

Elaine Jessica Weyuker is an ACM Fellow, an IEEE Fellow (since 2003), and an AT&T Fellow at Bell Labs for research in software metrics and testing as well as elected to the National Academy of Engineering. She is the author of over 130 papers in journals and refereed conference proceedings.

== Education ==
Weyuker received a Ph.D. in Computer Science from Rutgers University, and an M.S.E. from the University of Pennsylvania.

== Career ==
Prior to moving to AT&T Labs, she was on the faculty of the Courant Institute of Mathematical Sciences of New York University, was a faculty member at the City University of New York, a Systems' Engineer at IBM, and a programmer at Texaco.

She was the chair of the ACM-W Council, a member of the executive committee of the Coalition to Diversify Computing, a member of the Rutgers University Graduate School Advisory Board, and was a member of the board of directors of the Computing Research Association. She is or was a member of the editorial boards of IEEE Transactions on Software Engineering, IEEE Transactions on Dependable and Secure Computing, IEEE Spectrum, the Empirical Software Engineering Journal, and the Journal of Systems and Software, and was a founding editor of the ACM Transactions of Software Engineering and Methodology. She was the Secretary/Treasurer of ACM SIGSOFT and was an ACM National Lecturer.

== Awards ==
In 2002, Weyuker was elected a member of the National Academy of Engineering for "contributions to software testing, reliability, and measurement, and for the development of mathematical foundations for software testing".

In 2004, she was given the Harlan D. Mills Award from the IEEE Computer Society, "for leading research on rigorous software testing including industrial evaluations of the comparative effectiveness and costs of such testing methods."

In 2007, Weyuker received the ACM SIGSOFT Outstanding Research Award for "deep and lasting contributions and impact to software engineering as a discipline", and in 2008 she won the Anita Borg Institute, Technical Leadership Award for "outstanding research and technical leadership."

She was awarded the ACM 2010 Presidential Award for "her tireless efforts in the development and growth of the ACM Women's Council".

== Selected bibliography ==
=== Books ===
- Davis, Martin D.; Sigal, Ron; Weyuker, Elaine J. (1994). Computability, Complexity, and Languages: Fundamentals of Theoretical Computer Science (2nd ed.). San Diego, California: Academic Press. ISBN 978-0-122-06382-4.

=== Book chapters ===
- Weyuker, Elaine J.; Ostrand, Thomas J. (2010). "Chapter 9: An Automated Fault Prediction System". In Oram, Andy; Wilson, Greg (eds.). Making Software: What Really Works, and Why We Believe It. Sebastopol, California: O'Reilly. pp. 145–160. ISBN 978-0-596-80832-7.
- Weyuker, Elaine J. (2001). "Chapter 24: The Trouble with Testing Components". In Heineman, George T.; Councill, William T. (eds.). Component-Based Software Engineering: Putting the Pieces Together. Boston, Massachusetts: Addison-Wesley. pp. 499–512. ISBN 978-0-768-68207-6.
