= Mary Shaw (computer scientist) =

American software engineer

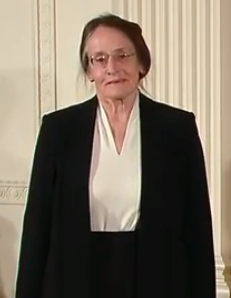
- Shaw in 2014
- Born: 1943 (age 82–83); Washington D.C., U.S.
- Awards: National Medal of Technology (2012)
- Scientific career
- Fields: Computer science
- Workplaces: Carnegie Mellon University

Mary Shaw (born 1943) is an American software engineer, and the Alan J. Perlis Professor of Computer Science in the School of Computer Science at Carnegie Mellon University, known for her work in the field of software architecture.

== Biography ==
=== Early life ===
Mary M. Shaw was born in Washington D.C. in 1943. Her father (Eldon Shaw) was a civil engineer and economist for the U.S. Department of Agriculture and her mother (Mary Shaw) was a homemaker. Shaw attended high school in Bethesda, Maryland, during the Sputnik cold war era during which technology was rapidly improving.

In high school, Shaw participated for two summers during high school in an after school program which taught students about computers. This program run by International Business Machines (IBM) and was a chance for student to explore fields outside of the normal curriculum. This was Shaw's first introduction to computers.

=== Studies and career ===
Shaw obtained her BA from Rice University around 1965, and her PhD in computer science from Carnegie Mellon University in 1972.

With Marion Créhange (1937 – 2022), a French computer scientist who got a PhD in Computer Science in 1961, she is considered a pioneer in computer science.

After her graduation at Rice University, Shaw had started her career in industry, working as systems programmer at the Research Analysis Corporation. She also continued to do research at Rice University. In 1972 she joined the Carnegie Mellon University faculty, where she was eventually appointed Professor of Computer Science. From 1984 to 1987 she was also Chief Scientist at its Software Engineering Institute, from 1992 to 1999 Associate Dean for Professional Education, and from 2001 to 2006 Co-Director of the Sloan Software Industry Center.

In 2011, Mary Shaw and David Garlan received the Outstanding Research Award from ACM SIGSOFT, the Association of Computing Machinery's Special Interest Group on Software Engineering, for their "significant and lasting software engineering research contributions through the development and promotion of software architecture."

On October 3, 2014, U.S. President Barack Obama awarded Shaw with National Medal of Technology and Innovation. She was named recipient of the award in 2012.

== Work ==
Shaw's main area of research interest is software engineering, including architectural, educational and historical aspects. Shaw authored seminal works in the field of software architecture along with David Garlan.

=== Software Architecture, 1996 ===
Shaw's most cited work "Software Architecture: Perspectives on an Emerging Discipline," co-authored with David Garlan, examines the concept of "architectures for software systems as well as better ways to support software development." The book aims:

"... to bring together the useful abstractions of systems design and the notations and tools of the software developer, and look at patterns used for system organization... to illustrate the discipling and examine the ways in which architectural design can impact software design. Our selection emphasizes informal descriptions, touching lightly on formal notations and specifications and on tools to support them."

In this work Garlan and Shaw "describe an architecture of a system as a collection of computational components together with a description of the interactions between these components—the connectors." A component is simply described as "the elements that perform computation."

== Reception ==
In 2011 Shaw and Garlan were awarded the Outstanding Research Award for 2011 by Carnegie Mellon University (CMU) in honor of their pioneering research in the field of Software Architecture. William Scherlis, the director of CMU's Institute for Software Research, commented on Shaw and Garlan contribution:

The term 'software architecture' was first used in the late 1960s, but its significance didn't become clear until almost 20 years later, when David and Mary asserted that architecture could be addressed using systematic approaches. Their work and that of their colleagues here at Carnegie Mellon has since led to engineering methods for architectural modeling, analysis and identification of architecture-level patterns, the use of which has now become standard in the engineering of larger scale software systems.

== Selected publications ==
- Mary Shaw and Frank Hole. Computer analysis of chronological seriation, 1967.
- Mary Shaw, Alan Perlis and Frederick Sayward (eds.) Software metrics: an analysis and evaluation, 1981.
- Mary Shaw (ed). Carnegie-Mellon curriculum for undergraduate computer science, 1985.
- Mary Shaw and David Garlan. Software Architecture: Perspectives on an Emerging Discipline, Prentice Hall, 1996.
- Mary Shaw, Sufficient Correctness and Homeostasis in Open Resource Coalitions: How Much Can You Trust Your Software System, "" 2000,

Articles, a selection:

- Mary Shaw. "Reduction of Compilation Costs Through Language Contraction". In: Communications of the ACM, 17(5):245–250, 1974.
- Mary Shaw. "Prospects for an Engineering Discipline of Software". in: IEEE Software, 7(6):15–24, 1990.
- Mary Shaw. "Comparing Architectural Design Styles". in: IEEE Software, 12(6):27–41, 1995.
- "Mary Shaw Facts." Mary Shaw Facts. Your Dictionary, n.d. Web. 01 Feb. 2017.
- "Mary Shaw." Mary Shaw - Engineering and Technology History Wiki. ETHW, n.d. Web. 01 Feb. 2017.
