= Tony Wasserman =

American computer scientist

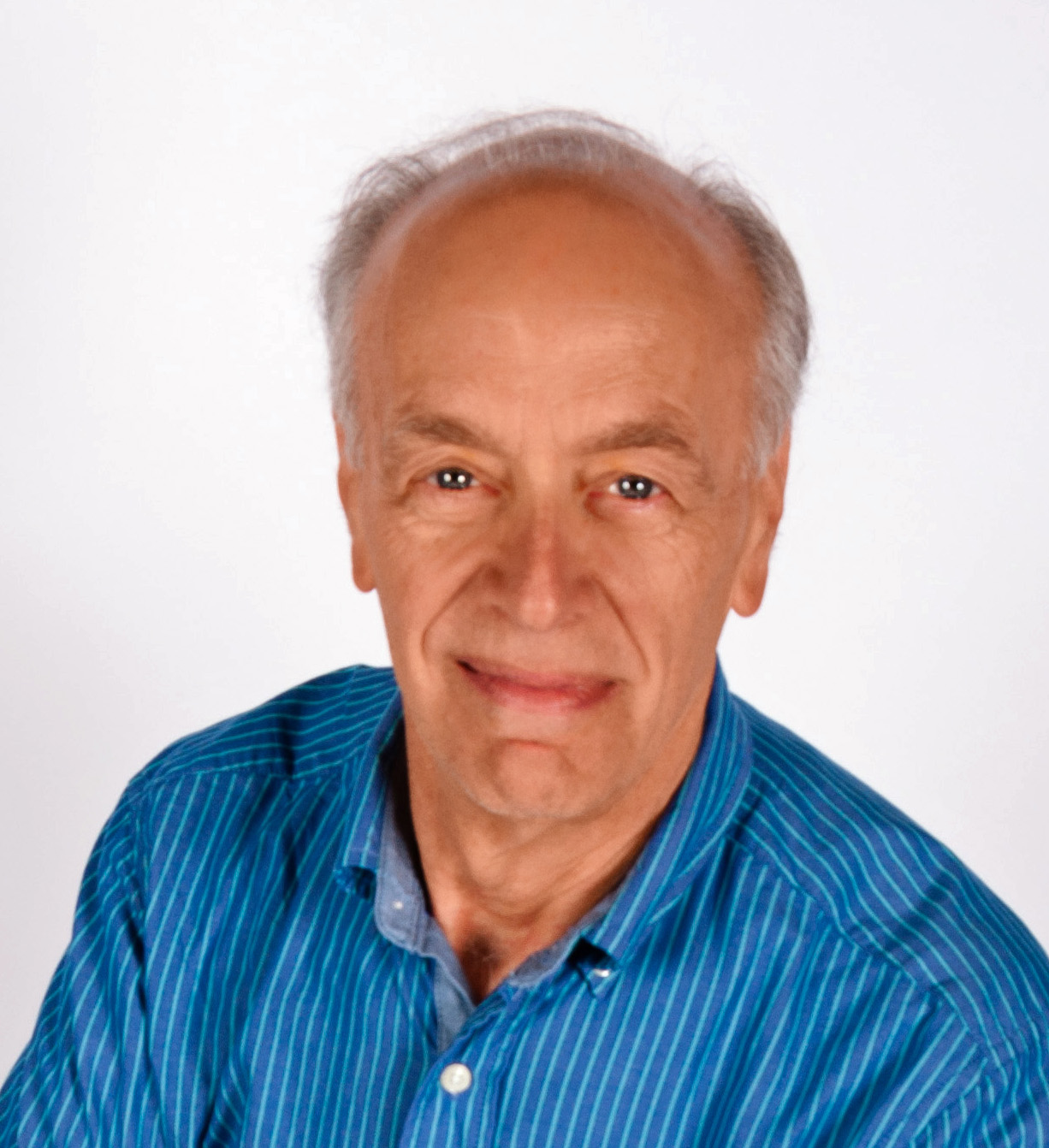
Tony Wasserman

Anthony I. Wasserman (born March 1, 1945 in New York City) is an American computer scientist. He was the founder and CEO of Interactive Development Environments, Inc., one of the first dotcoms. He was later a Professor of the Practice in Software Management at Carnegie Mellon Silicon Valley from 2005 to 2023.

Wasserman was executive director of Carnegie Mellon's Center for Open Source Investigation, and has been an advisor to startups in the SkyDeck accelerator program at University of California, Berkeley. He was a member of the Board of Directors of the Open Source Initiative from 2010 to 2016. In 2025 he won a lifetime achievement award from the IEEE Technical Committee on Software Engineering. He currently works at Software Methods and Tools, where he is an advisor to startups, primarily on product management.

== Career ==
Early in his career, Wasserman became a full-time faculty member in the Section on Medical Information Science at the University of California, San Francisco, in 1971, and was promoted to Professor in 1983. At that time, he also served as a Lecturer in the Computer Science Division at the University of California, Berkeley.

His teaching and research was centered around software engineering, particularly software design methods and tools. In addition to more than 100 research publications, Wasserman co-edited four editions of Tutorial on Software Design Techniques with Peter Freeman, published by the IEEE Computer Society Press (ISBN 0-8186-0514-6), and edited Tutorial: Software Development Environments (ISBN 0-8186-0385-2) and Tutorial: Programming Language Design (ISBN 0-8186-0312-7), both published by the IEEE Computer Society.

In 1983, Wasserman founded and was CEO of Interactive Development Environments (IDE), a computer-aided software engineering company that was one of the first 100 dotcoms (no. 78), from 1983-1993, and as Chair from 1983-1996. IDE developed the multiuser Software through Pictures computer-aided software engineering environment for the Sun Microsystems (and other) engineering workstations. IDE integrated Software through Pictures with several programming environments and documentation tools to create developments for Ada and C++.

After a short term as VP of Engineering for a dot-com startup, Tony became vice president of Bluestone Software in 2000. In that role, he led a team that supported the use of early mobile devices with Bluestone's J2EE application server before its acquisition by Hewlett Packard.

In 2005, he became Professor of Software Management Practice at Carnegie Mellon University's Silicon Valley campus, where Wasserman led the development of the Software Management curriculum and taught classes in software product definition, software product strategy, and open source software. He retired from that role in 2023, and now serves as an advisor through the SkyDeck accelerator at University of California, Berkeley.

During his academic career, he also held a sabbatical appointment at the Vrije Universiteit Amsterdam (1978), and was Shaw Visiting Scholar in the School of Computing at the National University of Singapore (2014).

== Awards ==
In 1995 Wasserman received the first ACM SIGSOFT Distinguished Service Award

In 1996 he was elected as a Fellow of the IEEE "for contributions to software engineering, including the development of computer-aided software engineering (CASE) tools". In the same year he also was selected as a Fellow of the Association for Computing Machinery "for technical and professional contributions to the field of software engineering".

In 2012 he received the IEEE TCSE Distinguished Educator Award, followed by the ACM SIGSOFT Influential Educator Award in 2013.

In 2020 he was elected as a Fellow of the International Federation of Information Processing (IFIP), and previously received the IFIP Silver Core Award in 1986. He was also elected as a Fellow of the International Software Product Management Association (ISPMA) in 2022.

In 2025 he won the IEEE Technical Community on Software Engineering Lifetime Achievement Award.

== Professional activities ==
Tony Wasserman has been an active member of the software engineering and open source communities throughout his career, making contributions to organizations, conferences, and publications. He has extensive service, dating to 1975, as a member of both academic and industry conference program committees, as a conference program speaker, and as a referee for papers submitted to technical journals. He served as one of the three conference coordinators for the 19th International Conference on Software Engineering (1997).

He was co-founder, along with R. Stockton Gaines, of ACM SIGSOFT and its first elected Chair in 1976, serving on its Executive Committee until 1993. He joined the IFIP Working Group on Design and Evaluation of Information Systems (WG 8.1) in 1977, and served as General Chair of its annual CAiSE conference in 1994. He joined the IFIP Working Group on Open Source Systems (WG 2.13) in 2006, and served as its Chair from 2015 until 2022, when it was disbanded. He was General Chair of their annual conferences in 2009 and 2014, and Program Committee Co-Chair in 2015.

Tony served as an Associate Editor of ACM Computing Surveys from 1980 to 1983, and as Editor-in-Chief from 1983 to 1986.. He serves as a member of the Editorial Advisory Board of Information Systems

Wasserman is a member of the International Advisory Group for the Modular Open Source Identity Platform (MOSIP)

== Academic Research ==
Wasserman's academic research focused on two projects: the User Software Engineering (USE) project, begun at the University of California, San Francisco, in 1975 and the Center for Open Source Investigation (COSI), begun at Carnegie Mellon University, Silicon Valley, in 2005. The focus of the User Software Engineering project was "user-centered design, combined with techniques for software engineering, in order to produce systems that are reliable, easy to use, and well adapted to user needs."

The User Software Engineering project produced several tools that were released under a BSD open source license, beginning in 1980, making them among the earliest open source software projects. These tools included Troll/USE, an early relational DBMS, and RAPID/USE, a user interaction prototyping tool. These tools were included in the multi-user Software through Pictures integrated software engineering environments, which was commercially released by Interactive Development Environments, Inc. (IDE). This work led to Wasserman's model that identifies five dimensions for software tool integration: platform integration, presentation integration, data integration, control integration, and process integration

The focus of the COSI work was evaluation and adoption of open source software by businesses and organizations, originally the Business Readiness Rating, later OSSpal.

Wasserman earned his A.B. degree at the University of California, Berkeley, in 1966 with a double major in Mathematics and Physics, and earned his Ph.D. in Computer Sciences from the University of Wisconsin - Madison in 1970.
