= Lionel Briand =

Canadian-French software engineer

Lionel Claude Briand
- Citizenship: Canadian, French
- Awards: IEEE Fellow (2010); Harlan D. Mills Award (2012); ERC Advanced Grant (2016); ACM Fellow (2020); ACM SIGSOFT Outstanding Research Award (2022); Fellow, Royal Society of Canada (2023); Member, Academia Europaea (2025)
- Scientific career
- Fields: Trustworthy AI, software engineering, software testing, verification and validation, requirements engineering, model-driven engineering, applied artificial intelligence
- Workplaces: University of Limerick and Lero (2024–present); University of Ottawa (2019–present); University of Luxembourg (2012–2024)
- Website: www.lbriand.info

Lionel Claude Briand is a Canadian-French software engineer and computer scientist. Since January 2024 he has been professor of software engineering at the University of Limerick and director of Lero, the Irish national research centre for software. He holds a joint appointment at the University of Ottawa, where he is the Distinguished Research Chair in Trustworthy AI-Enabled Software Systems and leads the Nanda laboratory, having held a Tier 1 Canada Research Chair in Intelligent Software Dependability and Compliance there from 2019 to 2026.

From 2012 to 2024 Briand was a professor at the University of Luxembourg, where he headed the software verification and validation department of the Interdisciplinary Centre for Security, Reliability and Trust (SnT) and served as the centre's vice-director from 2014 to 2019. From 2007 to 2012, he led the software verification and validation department (Certus) at Simula Research Laboratory in Oslo, Norway, in collaboration with industry partners. Further, he was a co-editor-in-chief of the journal Empirical Software Engineering (Springer) from 2004 to 2017.

His research includes Trustworthy AI, the testing, verification and validation of software systems, requirements engineering, model-driven engineering, and the application of machine learning and evolutionary computation to software engineering problems, much of it carried out in collaboration with industry.

He was elected a Fellow of the Institute of Electrical and Electronics Engineers in 2010 and a Fellow of the Association for Computing Machinery in 2020, with a citation for contributions to automated software testing. He received the Harlan D. Mills Award in 2012 and the ACM SIGSOFT Outstanding Research Award in 2022, and was awarded a European Research Council Advanced Grant in 2016. He was elected a Fellow of the Academy of Science of the Royal Society of Canada in 2023, a member of Academia Europaea, Informatics section, in 2025, and a member of the inaugural class of the ACM SIGSOFT Software Engineering Academy in 2026. Two of his papers have received the ICSE Most Influential Paper award, in 2015 and 2021.

== Awards and honours ==
- Researcher of the Year, Simula Research Laboratory, 2006, and Researcher of the Decade, 2011
- Fellow of the Institute of Electrical and Electronics Engineers, 2010
- Harlan D. Mills Award, IEEE Computer Society, 2012
- Engineer of the Year, IEEE Reliability Society, 2013, "for achievements in model-based software verification and testing"
- ICSE Most Influential Paper award, 2015 and 2021
- European Research Council Advanced Grant, 2016
- Fellow of the Association for Computing Machinery, 2020, "for contributions to automated software testing"
- ACM SIGSOFT Outstanding Research Award, 2022
- Fellow of the Academy of Science, Royal Society of Canada, 2023
- Member of Academia Europaea, Informatics section, 2025
- Fellow of the International Core Academy of Sciences and Humanities, 2026
- Member of the inaugural class of the ACM SIGSOFT Software Engineering Academy, 2026
- Fellow of the Asia-Pacific Artificial Intelligence Association

== Selected Publications ==
- Wang, Guancheng; Xu, Qinghua; Briand, Lionel C.; Liu, Kui (2026). "Mutation-guided unit test generation with a large language model". IEEE Transactions on Software Engineering. 52 (5): 1657–1671. arXiv:2506.02954. doi:10.1109/TSE.2026.3682975.
- Etezadi, Romina; Abualhaija, Sallam; Arora, Chetan; Briand, Lionel C. (2026). "Classifier or prompt: a case study on legal requirements traceability". Empirical Software Engineering. 31 (4): 85. arXiv:2502.04916. doi:10.1007/s10664-026-10827-1.
- Aghababaeyan, Zohreh; Abdellatif, Manel; Briand, Lionel C.; Ramesh, S. (2025). "DiffGAN: a test generation approach for differential testing of deep neural networks for image analysis". IEEE Transactions on Software Engineering. 51 (12): 3284–3309. arXiv:2410.19794. doi:10.1109/TSE.2025.3611329.
- Yousefizadeh, Hossein; Gu, Shenghui; Briand, Lionel C.; Nasr, Ali (2025). "Using cooperative co-evolutionary search to generate metamorphic test cases for autonomous driving systems". IEEE Transactions on Software Engineering. 51 (6): 1882–1911. arXiv:2412.03843. doi:10.1109/TSE.2025.3570897.
- Saboor Yaraghi, Ahmadreza; Holden, Darren; Kahani, Nafiseh; Briand, Lionel C. (2025). "Automated test case repair using language models". IEEE Transactions on Software Engineering. 51 (4): 1104–1133. arXiv:2401.06765. doi:10.1109/TSE.2025.3541166.
- Sharifi, Sepehr; Stocco, Andrea; Briand, Lionel C. (2025). "System safety monitoring of learned components using temporal metric forecasting". ACM Transactions on Software Engineering and Methodology. 34 (6): 1–43. arXiv:2405.13254. doi:10.1145/3712196.
- Fatima, Sakina; Hemmati, Hadi; Briand, Lionel C. (2024). "FlakyFix: using large language models for predicting flaky test fix categories and test code repair". IEEE Transactions on Software Engineering. 50 (12): 3146–3171. arXiv:2307.00012. doi:10.1109/TSE.2024.3472476.
- Abbasishahkoo, Amin; Dadkhah, Mahboubeh; Briand, Lionel C.; Lin, Dayi (2024). "TEASMA: a practical methodology for test adequacy assessment of deep neural networks". IEEE Transactions on Software Engineering. 50 (12): 3307–3329. arXiv:2308.01311. doi:10.1109/TSE.2024.3482984.
- Pan, Rongqi; Ghaleb, Taher Ahmed; Briand, Lionel C. (2024). "LTM: scalable and black-box similarity-based test suite minimization based on language models". IEEE Transactions on Software Engineering. 50 (11): 3053–3070. arXiv:2304.01397. doi:10.1109/TSE.2024.3469582.
- Sharifi, Sepehr; Shin, Donghwan; Briand, Lionel C.; Aschbacher, Nathan (2023). "Identifying the hazard boundary of ML-enabled autonomous systems using cooperative coevolutionary search". IEEE Transactions on Software Engineering. 49 (12): 5120–5138. arXiv:2301.13807. doi:10.1109/TSE.2023.3327575.
- Zolfagharian, Amirhossein; Abdellatif, Manel; Briand, Lionel C.; Bagherzadeh, Mojtaba; Ramesh, S. (2023). "A search-based testing approach for deep reinforcement learning agents". IEEE Transactions on Software Engineering. 49 (7): 3715–3735. arXiv:2206.07813. doi:10.1109/TSE.2023.3269804.
- Aghababaeyan, Zohreh; Abdellatif, Manel; Briand, Lionel C.; Ramesh, S.; Bagherzadeh, Mojtaba (2023). "Black-box testing of deep neural networks through test case diversity". IEEE Transactions on Software Engineering. 49 (5): 3182–3204. arXiv:2112.12591. doi:10.1109/TSE.2023.3243522.
- Saboor Yaraghi, Ahmadreza; Bagherzadeh, Mojtaba; Kahani, Nafiseh; Briand, Lionel C. (2023). "Scalable and accurate test case prioritization in continuous integration contexts". IEEE Transactions on Software Engineering. 49 (4): 1615–1639. arXiv:2109.13168. doi:10.1109/TSE.2022.3184842.
- Bagherzadeh, Mojtaba; Kahani, Nafiseh; Briand, Lionel C. (2022). "Reinforcement learning for test case prioritization". IEEE Transactions on Software Engineering. 48 (8): 2836–2856. arXiv:2011.01834. doi:10.1109/TSE.2021.3070549.
- Pan, Rongqi; Bagherzadeh, Mojtaba; Ghaleb, Taher Ahmed; Briand, Lionel C. (2022). "Test case selection and prioritization using machine learning: a systematic literature review". Empirical Software Engineering. 27 (2): 29. arXiv:2106.13891. doi:10.1007/s10664-021-10066-6.
