= Carlo Ghezzi =

Italian software engineer

Carlo Ghezzi is an Italian software engineer. He is an emeritus professor and former chair of software engineering at the Politecnico di Milano, Italy, and an adjunct professor at the Università della Svizzera italiana (USI), Switzerland. At the Politecnico, he has been the Rector's Delegate for research, department chair, head of the PhD program, and member of the academic senate and of the board of governors of Politecnico.

== Education and academic career ==
He received his Dr.Eng. degree in electrical engineering from the Politecnico di Milano, where he spent most of his professional life, as assistant, associate, and full professor. He also taught and did research in other institutions: University of California, Los Angeles, US (1976), University of North Carolina at Chapel Hill, USA (1979–80), Università degli Studi di Padova, Italy (1980–81), Escuela Superior Latinoamericana de Informática, Argentina (1990), University of California, Santa Barbara, US (1991), Technical University of Vienna, Austria (1996), and University of Klagenfurt, Austria (1996).

Ghezzi is a 1999 ACM fellow (citation: "Numerous research contributions from compiler theory to real-time systems to software processes. A strong contributor to the software engineering community in Europe and worldwide.") and 2006 IEEE Fellow (citation: "for contributions to programming languages and software engineering"). In 2006, he was awarded the ACM SIGSOFT Distinguished Service Award. He is a Member of Istituto Lombardo Accademia di Scienze e Lettere.

== Professional service ==
He is a regular member of the program committee of important conferences of the software engineering field, such as the International Conference on Software Engineering (ICSE) and the Foundations of Software Engineering (FSE) conference, jointly held in conjunction with the European Software Engineering Conference (ESEC).

He has been chairing such conferences as program co-chair (ICSE 1991), program chair (ESEC/FSE '99), general chair (ICSE 2000), and general co-chair (International Conference on Service Oriented Computing, ICSOC 2006).

He has been a keynote speaker at several conferences, including ESEC 1993, the IEEE International Conference on Software Maintenance (ICSM 1997), the European Joint Conference on Theory and Practice of Software (ETAPS 2006), ICSE 2009, the IEEE International Conference on Engineering of Complex Computer Systems (ICECCS 2010), the IEEE International Conference on Software Engineering and Formal Methods (SEFM 2010), the International Symposium on Empirical Software Engineering and Measurement (ESEM 2010), ServiceWave (ServiceWave 2010), and Fundamentals of Software Engineering (FSEN 2011).

He has been editor in chief of ACM Transactions on Software Engineering and Methodology (2001–2006) and associate editor of IEEE Transactions on Software Engineering. He is currently an associate editor of Science of Computer Programming (Elsevier), Service Oriented Computing and Applications (Springer Science+Business Media), and Software Process Improvement and Practice (John Wiley & Sons).

== Research ==
His research has been focused on different facets of software engineering and programming languages. Currently, he is active in the area of software architectures, especially evolvable and distributed software architectures for ubiquitous and pervasive computer applications. His long-term goal has been to contribute to making software more dependable, basing it on solid and rigorous methodological and theoretical foundations.

Ghezzi has co-authored over 180 papers, almost all of which are published internationally. His papers appeared on prestigious journals like the Journal of the ACM, Information and Control (now Information and Computation), ACM Transactions on Software Engineering and Methodology, ACM Transactions on Programming Languages and Systems, IEEE Transactions on Software Engineering.

He is the co-author of 8 books, including:

- Programming Language Concepts. With M. Jazayeri. (First edition: John Wiley & Sons, 1982; ISBN 0-471-08755-6. Second edition: John Wiley & Sons, 1987; ISBN 0-471-82173-X. Third edition: John Wiley & Sons, 1998; ISBN 0-471-10426-4)
- Theoretical Foundations of Computer Science. With D. Mandrioli. (John Wiley & Sons, 1987; ISBN 0-471-83834-9)
- Fundamentals of Software Engineering. With M. Jazayeri and D. Mandrioli. (First edition: Prentice Hall, 1991; ISBN 0-13-820432-2. Second edition: Prentice Hall, 2003; ISBN 0-13-305699-6)

In 2008, he has been awarded an Advanced Investigators Grant from the European Research Council, funding the SMSCOM project.

Since 2020 he's been involved in Digital Humanism
