= Alexander L. Wolf =

American computer scientist

Alexander Lee Wolf
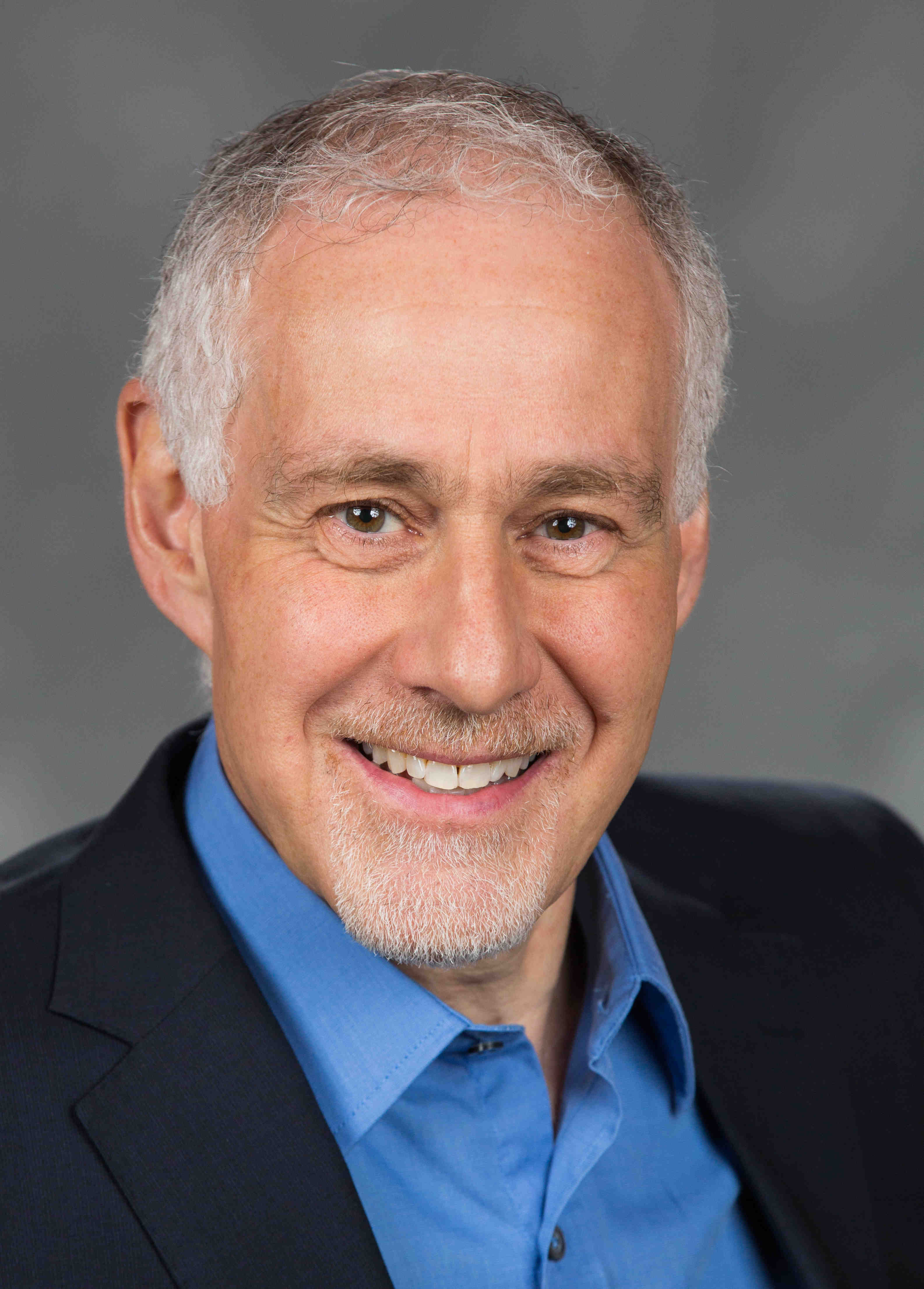
- 2014
- Born: September 12, 1956 (age 69); New York, New York, US
- Education: Stuyvesant High School; Queens College, City University of New York; University of Massachusetts Amherst
- Known for: Software architecture Publish/subscribe; Content-based networking Process discovery Software deployment
- Awards: ACM SIGSOFT Outstanding Research Award (2014); ACM SIGSOFT Distinguished Service Award (2012); ACM SIGSOFT Research Impact Award (2008, 2011); University of Massachusetts Amherst Department of Computer Science Outstanding Alumni Research Award (2010)
- Scientific career
- Fields: Computer Science
- Workplaces: AT&T Bell Laboratories; University of Colorado Boulder; University of Lugano; Imperial College London; University of California, Santa Cruz
- Thesis: Language and Tool Support for Precise Interface Control (1985)
- Doctoral advisor: Lori A. Clarke; Jack C. Wileden
- Website: https://users.soe.ucsc.edu/~alw/

Alexander L. Wolf (born 12 September 1956) is an American computer scientist known for his research in software engineering, distributed systems, and computer networking. He is credited, along with his collaborators, with introducing the modern study of software architecture, content-based publish/subscribe messaging, content-based networking, automated process discovery, and the software deployment lifecycle. Wolf's 1985 Ph.D. dissertation developed language features for expressing a module's import/export specifications and the notion of multiple interfaces for a type, both of which are now common in modern computer programming languages.

Wolf is Past President of the Association for Computing Machinery (ACM) and an ACM Fellow, IEEE Fellow, and BCS Chartered Fellow.

== Early life and education ==
Wolf was born in New York City to Viennese Austrian immigrant parents. He attended Stuyvesant High School, a public high school specializing in mathematics and science, graduating in 1974. Wolf majored in both geology and computer science at Queens College, City University of New York, where he received his BA degree in 1979. From 1979 to 1985 he studied computer science at the University of Massachusetts Amherst, receiving his MS degree in 1982 and Ph.D. degree in 1985.

== Career ==
Wolf remained at the University of Massachusetts Amherst for two years as a visiting assistant professor and research scientist working on the Arcadia Project, which was laying the technical and theoretical foundations for tool-rich, geographically distributed software development environments.

In 1987 Wolf joined AT&T Bell Laboratories in Murray Hill, New Jersey as a Member of the Technical Staff, where he conducted seminal research in the areas of object databases, software process, and software architecture.

Wolf began his academic career when he moved to the University of Colorado Boulder Department of Computer Science as an assistant professor in 1992. After promotion to associate and then full professor, he was named to the Charles V. Schelke Endowed Chair in the College of Engineering in 2005. He took a two-year leave of absence to help found the Faculty of Informatics at the University of Lugano, the first such faculty in the Italian-speaking region of Switzerland. In 2006, Wolf became a professor in the Department of Computing at Imperial College London. In July 2016, he became the sixth dean of the Jack Baskin School of Engineering at the University of California, Santa Cruz.

== Honors and awards ==
- ACM Fellow (2006)
- BCS Chartered Fellow (2008)
- ACM SIGSOFT Research Impact Award (2008)
- University of Massachusetts Amherst Department of Computer Science Outstanding Research Alumni Award (2010)
- IEEE Fellow (2011)
- ACM SIGSOFT Research Impact Award (2011)
- ACM SIGSOFT Distinguished Service Award (2012)
- ACM SIGSOFT Outstanding Research Award (2014)
