= John D. Gannon =

American computer scientist

John D. Gannon (1948 – June 12, 1999) was a prominent computer scientist, professor and chair of the department of computer science University of Maryland, at College Park. Gannon was a leading researcher in software engineering, specifically the specification, analysis, and testing of software systems.

== Career ==
Gannon earned his bachelor's and master's degrees from Brown University. He received his Ph.D. from the University of Toronto in 1975, after which he became an assistant professor of computer science at the University of Maryland that same year. In 1980, he became associate professor of computer science at the University of Maryland and full professor in 1988. In 1995, he became chair of the computer science department.

He served on the board of directors of the Computing Research Association and was chairman of the board for the Graduate Record Examination computer science committee.

He was the program director for software engineering for the National Science Foundation and served on the editorial boards of the IEEE Transactions on Software Engineering and ACM Computing Surveys.

== Awards ==
- 1993 Distinguished Scholar-Teacher, University of Maryland
- 1999 Fellow, Association for Computing Machinery

== Legacy ==
In October 1999, his wife, Nancy Garrison and brother, Rickard Gannon, established the John D. Gannon Memorial Scholarship "in recognition of his many contributions and achievements as a teacher, researcher and professional in the field of computer science."
