= Journal of Systems and Software =

- Discipline: Computing Software systems
- Language: English
- Edited by: P. Avgeriou, D. Shepherd

Publication details
- History: 1979–present
- Publisher: Elsevier (The Netherlands)
- Frequency: Monthly
- Impact factor: 2.829 (2020)

Standard abbreviations
- ISO 4: J. Syst. Softw.

Indexing
- ISSN: 0164-1212
- OCLC no.: 4583109

Links
- Journal homepage; Online access

The Journal of Systems and Software is a computer science journal in the area of software systems, established in 1979 and published by Elsevier.

== Content and scope ==
The journal publishes research papers, state-of-the-art surveys, and practical experience reports. It includes papers covering issues of programming methodology, software engineering, and hardware/software systems. Topics include: "software systems, prototyping issues, high-level specification techniques, procedural and functional programming techniques, data-flow concepts, multiprocessing, real-time, distributed, concurrent, and telecommunications systems, software metrics, reliability models for software, performance issues, and management concerns."

== Abstracting and indexing ==
According to the 2021 Journal Citation Reports, the Journal of Systems and Software has an impact factor of 3.514. According to Google Scholar, the journal has an h5-index of 61, which ranks third among international publication venues in software systems, after ICSE and IEEE Transactions on Software Engineering.

== Past and present editors-in-chief ==
- John Manley and Alan Salisbury (1979–1983)
- Richard E. Fairley (1984–1985)
- Robert L. Glass (1986–2001)
- David N. Card (2002–2008)
- Hans van Vliet (2009–2017)
- Paris Avgeriou and David Shepherd (2018–current)

== Notable articles ==
A few of the most notable (downloaded) articles are:

- Software defect prediction based on enhanced metaheuristic feature selection optimization and a hybrid deep neural network
- A software engineering perspective on engineering machine learning systems: State of the art and challenges
- MeTeaM: A method for characterizing mature software metrics teams

== Awards ==
The journal presents awards for the Best Papers, the Most Influential Papers (MIPs), and the Editor of the Year. The journal considers all Best Paper awards given in the same year as equally worthy (i.e., not implying any ordering). The Most Influential Paper awards are determined based on citation impact (via Google Scholar) and download metrics over a ten-year window.

=== 2025 ===
Best Paper Awards

- Ly, D. et al. (2025). "The Power of Words in Agile vs. Waterfall Development: Written Communication in Hybrid Software Teams." Journal of Systems and Software, 219. doi:10.1016/j.jss.2024.112243
- Benavides, D. et al. (2025). "UVL: Feature Modelling with the Universal Variability Language." Journal of Systems and Software, 225. doi:10.1016/j.jss.2024.112326
- Gustavsson, T. et al. (2025). "Job Satisfaction at Risk: Measuring the Role of Process Debt in Agile Software Development." Journal of Systems and Software, 222. doi:10.1016/j.jss.2025.112350
- Witter dos Santos, E., et al. (2025). "Developer Perceptions of Modern Code Review Processes in Practice: Insights from a Case Study in a Mid-Sized Company." Journal of Systems and Software, 222. doi:10.1016/j.jss.2024.112288

Most Influential Papers

- Gren, L. et al. (2015). "The prospects of a quantitative measurement of agility: A validation study on an agile maturity model." Journal of Systems and Software, 107. doi:10.1016/j.jss.2015.05.008

Editor of the Year

- Kelly Blincoe

=== 2024 ===
Best Paper Awards

- Berntsson Svensson, R. et al. (2024). "Not All Requirements Prioritization Criteria are Equal at All Times: A Quantitative Analysis." Journal of Systems and Software, 209. doi:10.1016/j.jss.2023.111909
- Serban, A. et al. (2024). "Software engineering practices for machine learning — Adoption, effects, and team assessment." Journal of Systems and Software, 209. doi:10.1016/j.jss.2023.111907

Most Influential Papers

- Gamalielsson, J. and Lundell, B. (2014). "Sustainability of Open Source software communities beyond a fork: How and why has the LibreOffice project evolved?." Journal of Systems and Software, 89. doi:10.1016/j.jss.2013.11.1077

Editor of the Year

- Alexander Serebrenik

=== 2023 ===
Best Paper Awards

- Moradi Dakhel, A. et al. (2023). "GitHub Copilot AI pair programmer: Asset or Liability?" Journal of Systems and Software, 203. doi:10.1016/j.jss.2023.111734

Most Influential Papers

- Daneva, M. et al. (2013). "Agile requirements prioritization in large-scale outsourced system projects: An empirical study." Journal of Systems and Software, 86. doi:10.1016/j.jss.2012.12.046

Editor of the Year

- Aldeida Aleti

=== 2022 ===
Best Paper Awards

- Smite, D. et al. (2022). "Changes in perceived productivity of software engineers during COVID-19 pandemic: The voice of evidence." Journal of Systems and Software, 186. doi:10.1016/j.jss.2021.111197
- Myllyaho, L. et al. (2022). "On misbehaviour and fault tolerance in machine learning systems." Journal of Systems and Software, 183. doi:10.1016/j.jss.2021.111096
- Mazuera-Rozo, A. et al. (2022). "Taxonomy of security weaknesses in Java and Kotlin Android apps." Journal of Systems and Software, 187. doi:10.1016/j.jss.2022.111233

Most Influential Papers

- Wang, X. et al. (2012). "“Leagile” software development: An experience report analysis of the application of lean approaches in agile software development." Journal of Systems and Software, 85. doi:10.1016/j.jss.2012.01.061
- Strode, D. et al. (2012). "Coordination in co-located agile software development projects." Journal of Systems and Software, 85. doi:10.1016/j.jss.2012.02.017
- Ferreira, K. et al. (2012). "Identifying thresholds for object-oriented software metrics." Journal of Systems and Software, 85. doi:10.1016/j.jss.2011.05.044

Editor of the Year

- Heiko Koziolek

=== 2021 ===
Best Paper Awards

- Kasauli, R. et al. (2021). "Requirements engineering challenges and practices in large-scale agile system development." Journal of Systems and Software, 172. doi:10.1016/j.jss.2020.110851
- Beecham, S. et al. (2021). "Do scaling agile frameworks address global software development risks? An empirical study." Journal of Systems and Software, 171. doi:10.1016/j.jss.2020.110823
- Verdecchia, R. et al. (2021). "Building and evaluating a theory of architectural technical debt in software-intensive systems." Journal of Systems and Software, 176. doi:10.1016/j.jss.2021.110925
- Shastri, Y. et al. (2021). "The role of the project manager in agile software development projects." Journal of Systems and Software, 173. doi:10.1016/j.jss.2020.110871
- Irshad, M. et al. (2021). "Adapting Behavior Driven Development (BDD) for large-scale software systems." Journal of Systems and Software, 177. doi:10.1016/j.jss.2021.110944
- Lenarduzzi, V. et al. (2021). "Does code quality affect pull request acceptance? An empirical study." Journal of Systems and Software, 171. doi:10.1016/j.jss.2020.110806

Most Influential Papers

- Arisholm, E. et al. (2010). "A systematic and comprehensive investigation of methods to build and evaluate fault prediction models." Journal of Systems and Software, 83. doi:10.1016/j.jss.2009.06.055
- Chen, T. et al. (2010). "Adaptive Random Testing: The ART of test case diversity." Journal of Systems and Software, 83. doi:10.1016/j.jss.2009.02.022
- Tang, A. et al. (2010). "A comparative study of architecture knowledge management tools." Journal of Systems and Software, 83. doi:10.1016/j.jss.2009.08.032
- Eric Wong, W. et al. (2010). "A family of code coverage-based heuristics for effective fault localization." Journal of Systems and Software, 83. doi:10.1016/j.jss.2009.09.037
- Cabot, J. et al. (2010). "Verification and validation of declarative model-to-model transformations through invariants." Journal of Systems and Software, 83. doi:10.1016/j.jss.2009.08.012

Editor of the Year

- Burak Turhan

=== 2020 ===
Best Paper Awards

- Trautsch, F. et al. (2020). "Are unit and integration test definitions still valid for modern Java projects? An empirical study on open-source projects." Journal of Systems and Software, 159. doi:10.1016/j.jss.2019.110421
- Nguyen, P. et al. (2020). "CrossRec: Supporting software developers by recommending third-party libraries." Journal of Systems and Software, 161. doi:10.1016/j.jss.2019.110460
- Sharma, G. et al. (2020). "Exploring onboarding success, organizational fit, and turnover intention of software professionals." Journal of Systems and Software, 159. doi:10.1016/j.jss.2019.110442
- Stray, V. and Moe, N.B. (2020). "Understanding coordination in global software engineering: A mixed-methods study on the use of meetings and Slack." Journal of Systems and Software, 170. doi:10.1016/j.jss.2020.110717
- Gregory, J. et al. (2020). "The long and winding road: MBSE adoption for functional avionics of spacecraft." Journal of Systems and Software, 160. doi:10.1016/j.jss.2019.110453

Most Influential Papers

- Chen, T. et al. (2010). "Adaptive Random Testing: The ART of test case diversity." Journal of Systems and Software, 83. doi:10.1016/j.jss.2009.02.022

Editor of the Year

- Alexander Chatzigeorgiou

=== 2019 ===
Best Paper Awards

- Luz, W. et al. (2019). "Adopting DevOps in the real world: A theory, a model, and a case study." Journal of Systems and Software, 157. doi:10.1016/j.jss.2019.07.083

Most Influential Papers

- Petersen, K. et al. (2009). "A comparison of issues and advantages in agile and incremental development between state of the art and an industrial case." Journal of Systems and Software, 82. doi:10.1016/j.jss.2009.03.036
- Abreu, R. et al. (2009). "A practical evaluation of spectrum-based fault localization." Journal of Systems and Software, 82. doi:10.1016/j.jss.2009.06.035
- Becker, S. et al. (2009). "The Palladio component model for model-driven performance prediction." Journal of Systems and Software, 82. doi:10.1016/j.jss.2008.03.066
- Misra, S. et al. (2009). "Identifying some important success factors in adopting agile software development practices." Journal of Systems and Software, 82. doi:10.1016/j.jss.2009.05.052

Editor of the Year

- Earl Barr

=== 2018 ===
Best Paper Awards

- Graziotin, D. et al. (2018). "What happens when software developers are (un)happy." Journal of Systems and Software, 140. doi:10.1016/j.jss.2018.02.041
