= David Notkin =

American professor and software engineer

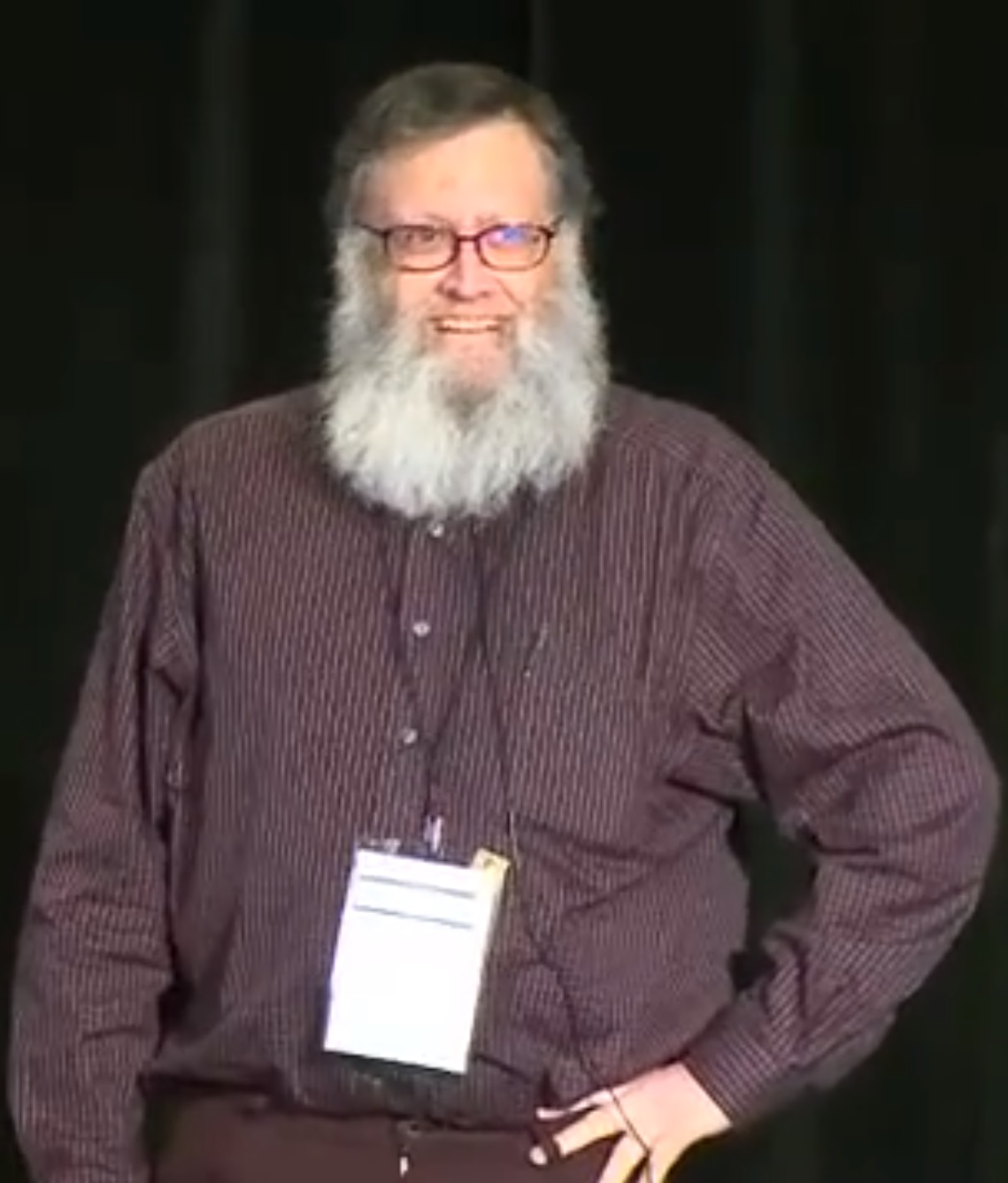
- Notkin delivering lightning talk for the National Center for Women & Information Technology in 2012
- Born: January 1, 1955; Syracuse, New York, US
- Died: April 22, 2013 (aged 58)
- Education: Brown University; Carnegie Mellon University
- Scientific career
- Fields: Software engineering
- Workplaces: University of Washington
- Doctoral advisor: Arie Habermann
- Doctoral students: Gail C. Murphy

David Notkin (1 January 1955 – 22 April 2013) was an American software engineer and professor of computer science.

== Early life and education ==
Notkin was born in 1955 in Syracuse, New York, U.S. He pursued his Sc. B. degree from Brown University, graduating in 1977, and later received his doctoral degree from Carnegie Mellon University in 1984. He then moved to Seattle and joined as a faculty at the University of Washington. His interest was in software engineering, with a particular focus on software evolution.

== Career ==
In 2000, Notkin received the Distinguished Graduate Mentor Award from the University of Washington. He served as chair of the computer science and engineering department from 2001 to 2006, during which he helped to open the Paul G. Allen Center for Computer Science & Engineering.

He was a Fellow of both the ACM and IEEE. From 2007 to 2012, he served as the editor-in-chief of the ACM Transactions on Software Engineering and Methodology. He was also a board member of the Computing Research Association.

Notkin is also noted for his efforts to expand the demographics of computing research, particularly to include women. In 2013, he received the A. Nico Habermann Award in recognition of this. He is also one of the two people after whom the Harrold and Notkin Research and Graduate Mentoring Award, given by the National Center for Women & Information Technology, is named.

In February 2013, the University of Washington announced the creation of the David Notkin Endowed Graduate Fellowship in Computer Science & Engineering, in an event attended by over 300 computer science students at the university to recognise Notkin's contributions.

== Death and legacy ==
After a few years of battling cancer, Notkin died on April 22, 2013.

== Awards ==
Notkin received a number of awards:

- National Science Foundation Presidential Young Investigator Award (1988)
- Distinguished Graduate Mentor Award, University of Washington (2000)
- ACM SIGSOFT Distinguished Service Award (2007)
- ACM SIGSOFT Influential Educator Award (2012)
- ACM SIGSOFT Outstanding Research Award (2013)
- A. Nico Habermann Award (2013)
