= Lori A. Clarke =

American computer scientist

- Born: New York, New York
- Education: University of Colorado; University of Rochester
- Known for: Software Engineering
- Awards: ACM Fellow (1998); IEEE Fellow (2011)
- Scientific career
- Fields: Computer Science
- Workplaces: University of Massachusetts Amherst
- Thesis: Test Data Generation and Symbolic Execution of Programs as an Aid to Program Validation (1976)
- Doctoral advisor: Leon J. Osterweil
- Doctoral students: Alexander L. Wolf
- Website: laser.cs.umass.edu/people/clarke.html

Lori A. Clarke is an American computer scientist noted for her research on software engineering. Her research investigates the application of software engineering technologies to detect errors and vulnerabilities in human-intensive processes in healthcare, scientific workflow, and digital government.

== Biography ==
Clarke received a B.A. in Mathematics from the University of Rochester in 1969. She received a Ph.D in Computer Science from the University of Colorado in 1976.

She then joined the Department of Computer Science at the University of Massachusetts Amherst as an assistant professor in 1976. While there she was promoted to associate professor in 1981 and to professor in 1986. In 2011, she became the chair of the School of Computer Science. In 2015 she earned the status of emeritus professor.

She was a board member for SIGSOFT from 1985 to 2001, including the chair from 1993 to 1997. She was a board member of CRA from 1999 to 2009. She has been a member of the CRA-W Board since 2001 and was the co-chair of CRA-W from 2005 to 2008.

Clarke is noted for her leadership in broadening participation in computing, particularly from underrepresented minorities.

== Awards ==
In 1998, she was named an ACM Fellow.

Her other notable awards include:

- IEEE Fellow in 2011 for contributions to software testing and verification.
- ACM SIGSOFT Outstanding Research Award, 2011
- ACM SIGSOFT Distinguished Service Award, 2002
