= David Garlan =

Computer-science professor

David Garlan from the Carnegie Mellon University was selected for the ACM SIGSOFT Outstanding Research Award in 2011. He was named Fellow of the Institute of Electrical and Electronics Engineers (IEEE) in 2013 for contributions to software architecture.
