= Software Engineering Notes =

ACM SIGSOFT informal journal

The ACM SIGSOFT Software Engineering Notes (SEN) is published by the Association for Computing Machinery (ACM) for the Special Interest Group on Software Engineering (SIGSOFT). It was established in 1976, and the first issue appeared in May 1976. It provides a forum for informal articles and other information on software engineering. The headquarters is in New York City. Since 1990, it has been published five times a year.
