= International Conference on Automated Software Engineering =

- Abbreviation: ASE
- Discipline: software engineering

Publication details
- Publisher: ACM and IEEE Computer Society
- History: 1986–
- Frequency: annual

The International Conference on Automated Software Engineering (ASE) is a large annual software engineering conference. The first conference in the series was held in 1986. Between 1986 and 1990 the conference was known as Knowledge-Based Software Assistant (KBSA), between 1991 and 1996 the conference was known as Knowledge-Based Software Engineering (KBSE).

== List of Conferences ==
Past and future ASE conferences include:

Year	Conference	City	Country	Notes
2022	ASE-37	Ann Arbor, Michigan	(United States) USA	
2021	ASE-36	Melbourne, Australia	Australia	Online due to pandemic
2020	ASE-35	Melbourne, Australia	Australia	Online due to pandemic
2019	ASE-34	San Diego, California	(United States) USA	
2018	ASE-33	Montpellier, France	France	
2017	ASE-32	Urbana Champaign, Illinois	(United States) USA	
2016	ASE-31	Singapore, Singapore	Singapore	
2015	ASE-30	Lincoln, Nebraska	(United States) USA	
2014	ASE-29	Västerås, Sweden	Sweden	
2013	ASE-28	Palo Alto, California	(United States) USA	
2012	ASE-27	Essen, Germany	Germany	
2011	ASE-26	Lawrence, Kansas	(United States) USA	
2010	ASE-25	Antwerp	Belgium	
2009	ASE-24	Auckland	New Zealand	
2008	ASE-23	L'Aquila	Italy	
2007	ASE-22	Atlanta	(United States) USA	
2006	ASE-21	Tokyo	Japan	
2005	ASE-20	Long Beach, California	(United States) USA	
2004	ASE-19	Linz	Austria	
2003	ASE-18	Montreal	Canada	
2002	ASE-17	Edinburgh	(United Kingdom) UK	
2001	ASE-16	San Diego	(United States) USA	
2000	ASE-15	Grenoble	France	
1999	ASE-14	Cocoa Beach, Florida	(United States) USA	
1998	ASE-13	Honolulu, Hawaii	(United States) USA	
1997	ASE-12	Lake Tahoe, Nevada	(United States) USA	
1996	KBSE-11	Syracuse, New York	(United States) USA	program
1995	KBSE-10	Boston, Massachusetts	(United States) USA	program, summary
1994	KBSE-9	Monterey, California	(United States) USA	program
1993	KBSE-8	Chicago, Illinois	(United States) USA	program, summary
1992	KBSE-7	McLean, Virginia	(United States) USA	program, summary
1991	KBSE-6	Syracuse, New York	(United States) USA	summary
1990	KBSA-5	Syracuse, New York	(United States) USA	summary
1989	KBSA-4			
1988	KBSA-3			
1987	KBSA-2			
1986	KBSA-1			
