= International Conference on Software Engineering =

Software engineering conference

- Abbreviation: ICSE
- Discipline: software engineering

Publication details
- Publisher: ACM and IEEE Computer Society
- History: 1975–
- Frequency: annual

The International Conference on Software Engineering (ICSE) is one of the largest annual software engineering conferences. It has an 'A*' rating in the Rankings of the Computing Research and Education Association of Australasia (CORE) and an 'A1' rating from the Brazilian ministry of education. Furthermore, it is the software engineering conference with the highest Microsoft Academic field rating. The first ICSE conference was in 1975 in Washington DC.

== List of Conferences ==
Past and future ICSE conferences include:

Year	Conference	City, Country	General Chair(s)	Program Chair(s)	Notes
2029	ICSE 51	Tokyo, Japan	Hironori Washizaki, Waseda University, and Jianjun Zhao, Kyushu University		
2028	ICSE 50	Hawaii, USA	Rick Kazman, University of Hawaii		
2027	ICSE 49	Dublin, Ireland	Brian Fitzgerald, University of Limerick		
2026	ICSE 48	Rio de Janeiro, Brazil	Marcos Kalinowski, Pontifical Catholic University of Rio de Janeiro		
2025	ICSE 47	Ottawa, Canada	Tim Lethbridge, University of Ottawa, and Lionel Briand, University of Ottawa and LERO (Ireland)		
2024	ICSE 46	Lisbon, Portugal	Rui Maranhao Abreu and Ana C. R. Paiva, University of Porto		
2023	ICSE 45	Melbourne, Australia	John Grundy, Monash University		
2022	ICSE 44	Pittsburgh, US	Matthew Dwyer, University of Virginia		
2021	ICSE 43	Online due to pandemic, instead of Madrid, Spain	Natalia Juristo, Technical University of Madrid		
2020	ICSE 42	Online due to pandemic, instead of Seoul, South Korea	Gregg Rothermel, North Carolina State University and Doo-Hwan Bae, KAIST		
2019	ICSE 41	Montreal, Canada	Joanne M. Atlee, University of Waterloo		
2018	ICSE 40	Gothenburg, Sweden	Ivica Crnkovic, Chalmers University of Technology and University of Gothenburg		
2017	ICSE 39	Buenos Aires, Argentina	Sebastián Uchitel, University of Buenos Aires		
2016	ICSE 38	Austin, US	Laura K. Dillon, Michigan State University		
2015	ICSE 37	Florence, Italy	Antonia Bertolino, Italian National Research Council (CNR), Pisa		
2014	ICSE 36	Hyderabad, India	Pankaj Jalote, IIIT Delhi		
2013	ICSE 35	San Francisco, US	David Notkin, University of Washington		
2012	ICSE 34	Zürich, Switzerland	Martin Glinz, University of Zürich	Gail Murphy, Mauro Pezzè	
2011	ICSE 33	Honolulu, US	Richard Taylor, University of California, Irvine		
2010	ICSE 32	Cape Town, South Africa	Judith Bishop, University of Pretoria, South Africa and Jeff Kramer, Imperial College London, UK	Prem Devanbu, Sebastián Uchitel	
2009	ICSE 31	Vancouver, Canada	Stephen Fickas, University of Oregon, US		
2008	ICSE 30	Leipzig, Germany	Wilhelm Schäfer, Paderborn University, Germany		
2007	ICSE 29	Minneapolis, US	John Knight, University of Virginia, US		
2006	ICSE 28	Shanghai, China	Leon Osterweil, University of Massachusetts, Amherst, US	Dieter Rombach, Mary Lou Soffa	
2005	ICSE 27	St. Louis, US	Gruia-Catalin Roman, Washington University in St. Louis, US		
2004	ICSE 26	Edinburgh, UK	Anthony Finkelstein, University College London, UK		
2003	ICSE 25	Portland, US	Lori Clarke, University of Massachusetts, Amherst, US	Laurie Dillon, Walter Tichy	
2002	ICSE 24	Orlando, US	Will Tracz, Lockheed Martin Systems Integration, Owego, US		
2001	ICSE 23	Toronto, Canada	Hausi A. Müller, University of Victoria, Canada		
2000	ICSE 22	Limerick, Ireland	Carlo Ghezzi, Politecnico di Milano, Italy		
1999	ICSE 21	Los Angeles, US	Barry Boehm, University of Southern California, US		
1998	ICSE 20	Kyoto, Japan	Koji Torii, NAIST, Japan	Richard Kemmerer, Kokichi Futatsugi	
1997	ICSE 19	Boston, US	W. Richards Adrion, University of Massachusetts, Amherst, US		
1996	ICSE 18	Berlin, Germany	Dieter Rombach, University of Kaiserslautern, Germany		
1995	ICSE 17	Seattle, US	Dewayne Perry, Bell Labs, US		
1994	ICSE 16	Sorrento, Italy	Bruno Fadini, Università degli Studi di Napoli Frederico II, Italy		
1993	ICSE 15	Baltimore, US	Victor R. Basili, University of Maryland, US		
1992	ICSE 14	Melbourne, Australia	Tony Montgomery, RMIT University, Australia		
1991	ICSE 13	Austin, US	Les Belady, Microelectronics and Computer Technology Corporation, US		
1990	ICSE 12	Nice, France	François-Regis Valette, ONER-CERT, France		
1989	ICSE 11	Pittsburgh, US	Larry Druffel, Software Engineering Institute (SEI), US		
1988	ICSE 10	Raffles City, Singapore	Tan Chin Nam, Infocomm Media Development Authority, Singapore	Larry Druffel, Software Engineering Institute (SEI), US, Bertrand Meyer, Eiffel Software, US	
1987	ICSE 9	Monterey, US	William E. Riddle, Software Productivity Consortium, US		
1985	ICSE 8	London, UK	Manny M. Lehman, Imperial College, London, UK		
1984	ICSE 7	Orlando, US	T. Straeter, General Dynamics Electronics, San Diego, US		
1982	ICSE 6	Tokyo, Japan	Yutaka Ohno, Japan; Koji Kobayashi, Japan; Raymond T. Yeh, University of Maryland, US		
1981	ICSE 5	San Diego, US	Seymour Jeffrey, National Institute of Standards and Technology, US		
1979	ICSE 4	Munich, Germany	Friedrich (Fritz) L. Bauer, Technical University of Munich, West Germany		Sponsors: ACM SIGSOFT, European Research Office (ERO), German Informatics Society, and IEEE Computer Society.
