= Leon J. Osterweil =

American computer scientist

- Education: University of Maryland; Princeton University
- Known for: software engineering
- Awards: ACM Fellow (1998)
- Scientific career
- Fields: Computer Science
- Workplaces: University of Massachusetts Amherst; University of Colorado Boulder; University of California, Irvine
- Thesis: Some Results in Graph Enumeration (1971)
- Doctoral advisor: James Claggett Owings Jr.
- Doctoral students: Lori A. Clarke
- Website: laser.cs.umass.edu/people/ljo.html

Leon Joel Osterweil is an American computer scientist noted for his research on software engineering.

== Biography ==
Osterweil received a B. A. in mathematics from Princeton University in 1965. He received a M.A. in mathematics in 1970 and a Ph.D in mathematics in 1971 from the University of Maryland.

He then joined the Department of Computer Science at the University of Colorado Boulder as an assistant professor in 1971. While there he was promoted to associate professor in 1977 and to professor in 1982, he was chair of the department from 1981 to 1986. In 1988, he became a professor at the University of California, Irvine and he was department chair from 1989 to 1992. In 1993, he became a professor of Computer Science at the University of Massachusetts Amherst.

== Awards ==
In the year 1998, he was named an ACM Fellow.

His other notable awards include:

- ACM SIGSOFT Outstanding Research Award, 2003
- ICSE's Most Influential Paper Award, 1997
- ACM SIGSOFT Influential Educator Award, 2010
