= List of fellows of the Association for Computing Machinery =

This article lists people who have been named ACM Fellows, an award and fellowship granted by the Association for Computing Machinery (ACM) as its highest honorary grade of membership. The fellowship is reserved for the top 1% of ACM members who have exhibited "professional excellence" in their "technical, professional and leadership contributions". Since 1993, the people that have been elected as fellows are listed below:

== Fellows ==
=== 1994 ===
- James M. Adams
- Frances E. Allen
- Franz Leopold Alt
- William F. Atchison
- Richard H. Austing
- Kenneth E. Batcher
- C. Gordon Bell
- Michael W. Blasgen
- Danny Bobrow
- David Reeves Boggs
- Lorraine Borman
- Charles L. Bradshaw
- Daniel S. Bricklin
- Frederick P. Brooks Jr.
- Douglas K. Brotz
- Richard R. Burton
- Richard G. Canning
- Walter M. Carlson
- Vinton G. Cerf
- Donald D. Chamberlin
- Edgar F. Codd
- Edward G. Coffman
- Fernando J. Corbató
- Harvey G. Cragon
- Thomas A. D'Auria
- Thomas A. DeFanti
- Peter J. Denning
- Jack B. Dennis
- L Peter Deutsch
- Edsger W. Dijkstra
- Stephen W. Dunwell
- J. Presper Eckert
- Peter Elias
- Gerald L. Engel
- John H. Esbin
- Bob O. Evans
- Tse-Yun Feng
- Aaron Finerman
- Robert W. Floyd
- Michael J. Flynn
- Robert Frankston
- Frank L. Friedman
- Bernard A. Galler
- C. W. Gear
- Erol Gelenbe
- Adele J. Goldberg
- Calvin C. Gotlieb
- Susan L. Graham
- Jim Gray
- Cordell Green
- David Gries
- Carl Hammer
- Richard Hamming
- David Harel
- Fred H. Harris
- Juris Hartmanis
- Danny Hillis
- John Hopcroft
- Tom Hull
- Patterson Hume
- Harry Douglas Huskey
- William Kahan
- Ronald M. Kaplan
- Richard M. Karp
- Donald Knuth
- David J. Kuck
- Thomas Eugene Kurtz
- Ray Kurzweil
- Butler W. Lampson
- Stephen S. Lavenberg
- Joshua Lederberg
- John A. Lee
- Meir M. Lehman
- Bruce G. Lindsay
- Joyce Currie Little
- Chung Laung Liu
- M. Stuart Lynn
- Herbert Maisel
- Zohar Manna
- John McCarthy
- Edward J. McCluskey
- Daniel D. McCracken
- Paul R. McJones
- A J Milner
- Jack Minker
- Roger Michael Needham
- Peter G. Neumann
- Monroe M. Newborn
- John Kenneth Ousterhout
- Susan S. Owicki
- David Lorge Parnas
- David A. Patterson
- William B. Poucher
- Anthony Ralston
- Ronald L. Rivest
- Azriel Rosenfeld
- Jeff Rulifson
- Jean E. Sammet
- Dana Scott
- Daniel Siewiorek
- Herbert A. Simon
- Barbara B. Simons
- Martha E. Sloan
- Donald R. Slutz
- Burton J. Smith
- Richard E. Stearns
- Thomas B. Steel
- Guy L. Steele
- Harold S. Stone
- Michael Stonebraker
- William Strecker
- Bjarne Stroustrup
- Patrick Suppes
- Gerald Sussman
- Ivan Sutherland
- Edward A. Taft
- Robert E. Tarjan
- Robert William Taylor
- Charles P. Thacker
- Irving L. Traiger
- Joseph Traub
- Allen B. Tucker
- Andries van Dam
- Willis Howard Ware
- Stuart Wecker
- Ben Wegbreit
- Eric A. Weiss
- David John Wheeler
- Maurice Vincent Wilkes
- Shmuel Winograd
- Niklaus Wirth
- Seymour J. Wolfson
- William Allan Wulf
- L. A. Zadeh

=== 1995 ===
- Paul W. Abrahams
- Robert L. Ashenhurst
- Alan H. Barr
- Lawrence Bernstein
- Grady Booch
- David H. Brandin
- Richard P. Brent
- Loren C. Carpenter
- Edwin Catmull
- Robert Lee Constable
- Dorothy E. Denning
- David J. DeWitt
- Larry E. Druffel
- Erwin Engeler
- Stuart I. Feldman
- Henry Fuchs
- Zvi Galil
- M. R. Garey
- Myron Ginsberg
- John B. Goodenough
- Donald P. Greenberg
- Herbert R. J. Grosch
- Bertram Herzog
- Harold J. Highland
- Lance J. Hoffman
- Oscar H. Ibarra
- David S. Johnson
- Cliff B. Jones
- Kenneth W. Kennedy
- Won Kim
- S. Rao Kosaraju
- Richard E. Ladner
- S. Lakshmivarahan
- Ed Lazowska
- Nancy G. Leveson
- Jay Misra
- Jürg Nievergelt
- Anthony G. Oettinger
- Franco P. Preparata
- Roy Rada
- Daniel J. Rosenkrantz
- Gerard Salton
- Fred B. Schneider
- Larry Snyder
- Norihisa Suzuki
- Jeffrey D. Ullman
- Chris S. Wallace
- Peter Wegner
- John R. White
- J. Turner Whitted
- Gio Wiederhold
- Chak-Kuen Wong
- Andrew C. Yao
- Paul R. Young

=== 1996 ===
- William Richards Adrion
- Alfred V. Aho
- Narendra Ahuja
- Kurt Akeley
- Ruzena Bajcsy
- Gregor von Bochmann
- Anita Borg
- B. Chandrasekaran
- Bernard Chazelle
- Narsingh Deo
- George G. Dodd
- José Luis Encarnação
- Jeanne Ferrante
- Michael J. Fischer
- Dennis J. Frailey
- Robert M. Graham
- Michael A. Harrison
- Philip Heidelberger
- Mary Jane Irwin
- Jeffrey M. Jaffe
- Raj Jain
- Anita K. Jones
- Randy H. Katz
- Maria M. Klawe
- Lawrence H. Landweber
- Michael E. Lesk
- Henry M. Levy
- Barbara H. Liskov
- Richard R. Muntz
- Richard E. Nance
- Takao Nishizeki
- Bryan T. Preas
- T. R. N. Rao
- Edward M. Reingold
- John R. Rice
- Arnold L. Rosenberg
- Sartaj K. Sahni
- Hanan Samet
- John E. Savage
- Ravi Sethi
- Mary M. Shaw
- Abraham Silberschatz
- John A. Stankovic
- Larry Stockmeyer
- Andrew S. Tanenbaum
- Mary K. Vernon
- Uzi Vishkin
- Jeffrey S. Vitter
- Anthony I. Wasserman
- Mark Wegman
- Fred W. Weingarten
- Ian Witten
- Marshall C. Yovits

=== 1997 ===
- Ian F. Akyildiz
- Jean-Loup Baer
- Victor R. Basili
- Roger R. Bate
- Barry W. Boehm
- Imrich Chlamtac
- J. D. Couger
- W. Bruce Croft
- Gordon B. Davis
- David P. Dobkin
- Herbert Freeman
- Hector Garcia-Molina
- Irene Greif
- Yuri Gurevich
- John L. Hennessy
- Zvi Kedem
- Richard A. Kemmerer
- Harold Lawson
- Der-Tsai Lee
- Richard J. Lipton
- Nancy A. Lynch
- Daniel A. Menasce
- Raymond E. Miller
- Ronald H. Perrott
- Nicholas Pippenger
- Vaughan R. Pratt
- John H. Reif
- Raymond Reiter
- Paul Schneck
- Robert Sedgewick
- Kenneth Clem Sevcik
- Micha Sharir
- Alan C. Shaw
- Ben Shneiderman
- Kenneth Steiglitz
- Donald F. Towsley
- Elaine J. Weyuker
- Peter Widmayer
- Robert Wilensky
- Philip S. Yu
- Paolo Zanella

=== 1998 ===
- Dharma P. Agrawal
- Gregory R. Andrews
- Andrew W. Appel
- Hal Berghel
- James C. Browne
- Robert S. Cartwright
- Peter P. Chen
- Edmund M. Clarke
- Lori A. Clarke
- Richard J. Cole
- Clarence A. Ellis
- Richard P. Gabriel
- Gopal Krishna Gupta
- James Jay Horning
- Neil D. Jones
- Aravind K. Joshi
- Abraham Kandel
- Stephen T. Kent
- Simon S. Lam
- Kai Li
- David Maier
- David Notkin
- Susan Nycum
- Leon J. Osterweil
- P. Venkat Rangan
- John T. Richards
- Lawrence A. Rowe
- Barbara G. Ryder
- Alan L. Selman
- Carlo H. Séquin
- Howard Jay Siegel
- Eugene H. Spafford
- Éva Tardos
- Richard N. Taylor
- Albert J. Turner
- Emmerich Welzl
- Jeannette M. Wing
- Mihalis Yannakakis
- Stuart H. Zweben

=== 1999 ===
- Marc Auslander
- Kenneth P. Birman
- Ronald J. Brachman
- Robert T. Braden
- Robert L. Cook
- Joseph S. DeBlasi
- James Demmel
- Richard J. Fateman
- James D. Foley
- John D. Gannon
- C. M. Geschke
- Carlo Ghezzi
- Robert L. Glass
- Ronald L. Graham
- Leonidas J. Guibas
- Toshihide Ibaraki
- Takeo Kanade
- Philip M. Lewis
- David B. MacQueen
- Dianne Martin
- Larry Masinter
- Kurt Mehlhorn
- David L. Mills
- Dhiraj K. Pradhan
- Ahmed Sameh
- Pamela Samuelson
- Marc Snir
- Richard T. Snodgrass
- Mary Lou Soffa
- Chung-Jen Tan
- Koji Torii
- David L. Waltz
- John Warnock
- Akinori Yonezawa

=== 2000 ===
- Prithviraj Banerjee
- Francine Berman
- Laxmi N. Bhuyan
- Alan W. Biermann
- Shahid H. Bokhari
- Randy Bryant
- Peter Buneman
- Stuart K. Card
- Michael J. Carey
- Douglas E. Comer
- Karen Duncan
- Deborah Estrin
- Ronald Fagin
- Peter A. Freeman
- W. Kent Fuchs
- Donald J. Haderle
- Michael T. Heath
- Leonard Kleinrock
- Henry F. Korth
- Axel van Lamsweerde
- Raymond A. Lorie
- Donald W. Loveland
- Albert R. Meyer
- James H. Morris
- Larry L. Peterson
- Moshe Y. Vardi
- David S. Warren
- Reinhard Wilhelm
- Robin J. R. Williams
- Willy Zwaenepoel

=== 2001 ===
- Jacob A. Abraham
- Robert M. Aiken
- Tetsuo Asano
- Philip A. Bernstein
- Joel S. Birnbaum
- Alan H. Borning
- Yuri Breitbart
- Jin-Yi Cai
- David D. Clark
- Susan B. Davidson
- Johan de Kleer
- Jack Dongarra
- David J. Farber
- Joan Feigenbaum
- Domenico Ferrari
- Sally Floyd
- Erol Gelenbe
- John P. Hayes
- S. Sitharama Iyengar
- Ravishankar K. Iyer
- Joseph F. JaJa
- Robert E. Kahn
- Sung-Mo Kang
- Richard B. Kieburtz
- Robert A. Kowalski
- Jeffrey Kramer
- James F. Kurose
- Ruby B. Lee
- Witold Litwin
- Giovanni De Micheli
- Barton P. Miller
- Jeffrey C. Mogul
- Donald A. Norman
- Cherri M. Pancake
- Christos Papadimitriou
- Donn B. Parker
- Janak H. Patel
- Yale N. Patt
- Ira Pohl
- J. Mark Pullen
- Prabhakar Raghavan
- Raghu Ramakrishnan
- Ramamritham Krithivasan
- John C. Reynolds
- George G. Robertson
- Nick Roussopoulos
- Krishan K. Sabnani
- Ravi Sandhu
- Hans-Jörg Schek
- Richard D. Schlichting
- Kang G. Shin
- David B. Shmoys
- Alan J. Smith
- Ralf Steinmetz
- Jonathan Turner
- Marilyn C. Wolf
- Ouri Wolfson
- Pamela Zave

=== 2002 ===
- Pankaj K. Agarwal
- Vishwani D. Agrawal
- Özalp Babaoğlu
- Jon Crowcroft
- David E. Culler
- William J. Dally
- Thomas G. Dietterich
- Susan J. Eggers
- Harold N. Gabow
- Ambuj Goyal
- Adolfo Guzmán-Arenas
- Joseph Halpern
- Wen-mei Hwu
- Neil Immerman
- Sidney Karin
- Wendy A. Kellogg
- David B. Lomet
- Gary L. Miller
- C. Mohan
- Jeffrey F. Naughton
- Bantwal R. Rau
- David Salesin
- Mahadev Satyanarayanan
- Mateo Valero
- George Varghese
- John Wilkes

=== 2003 ===
- Rakesh Agrawal
- Mostafa Ammar
- Victor Bahl
- Bonnie Berger
- Elisa Bertino
- John M. Carroll
- Richard A. DeMillo
- Barbara J. Grosz
- Brent Hailpern
- Jiawei Han
- Mary Jean Harrold
- Peter E. Hart
- Mark A. Horowitz
- Paul Hudak
- H. V. Jagadish
- Anil K. Jain
- Ramesh C. Jain
- Niraj K. Jha
- Dexter Kozen
- Lin Yi-bing
- Kathleen McKeown
- Thomas P. Moran
- Eugene W. Myers
- Craig Partridge
- Daniel A. Reed
- Stuart J. Russell
- William H. Sanders
- Scott J. Shenker
- Gurindar S. Sohi
- C. J. van Rijsbergen

=== 2004 ===
- Bella Bose
- Janis A. Bubenko Jr.
- Luca Cardelli
- Andrew A. Chien
- George E. Collins
- Joel Emer
- Allan Gottlieb
- Vicki L. Hanson
- Mark D. Hill
- Yannis E. Ioannidis
- Frans Kaashoek
- Per-Åke Larson
- Peter Lee
- Paul V. Mockapetris
- Simon Peyton Jones
- Richard Schantz
- Michael D. Schroeder
- Stamatis Vassiliadis
- Benjamin W. Wah
- David S. Wise

=== 2005 ===
- Thomas E. Anderson
- Dines Bjørner
- Stephen R. Bourne
- Rodney Brooks
- Surajit Chaudhuri
- Keith D. Cooper
- David L. Dill
- Christophe Diot
- Michel Dubois
- Michael J. Franklin
- Ophir Frieder
- Robert Harper
- Maurice Herlihy
- Phokion G. Kolaitis
- Vipin Kumar
- T. V. Lakshman
- Brad A. Myers
- David M. Nicol
- Krishna Palem
- Thomas W. Reps
- Lui Sha
- Mikkel Thorup
- Eli Upfal
- Umesh Vazirani
- Vijay Vazirani
- Roy Want
- Gerhard Weikum
- Uri C. Weiser
- Daniel S. Weld
- Michael P. Wellman
- Jennifer Widom
- Walter Willinger
- David A. Wood
- Hui Zhang

=== 2006 ===
- Eric Allender
- Arvind
- Mikhail J. Atallah
- Ming-Syan Chen
- Susan T. Dumais
- Usama Fayyad
- Matthias Felleisen
- Kenneth D. Forbus
- Phillip B. Gibbons
- C. Lee Giles
- Albert G. Greenberg
- William D. Gropp
- Roch Guerin
- John V. Guttag
- Laura M. Haas
- Alon Yitzchak Halevy
- Anthony C. Hearn
- Thomas A. Henzinger
- Norman P. Jouppi
- John E. Laird
- James R. Larus
- Charles E. Leiserson
- Ming Li
- Nick McKeown
- J Strother Moore
- Alan F. Newell
- Peter Norvig
- Dianne P. O'Leary
- Dan R. Olsen Jr.
- Kunle Olukotun
- M. Tamer Özsu
- Vern Paxson
- Michael L. Scott
- Harry Shum
- Alfred Z. Spector
- Victor D. Vianu
- Marianne Winslett
- Alexander L. Wolf
- Bryant W. York
- Stanley B. Zdonik
- Lixia Zhang

=== 2007 ===
- Anant Agarwal
- Rajeev Alur
- Utpal Banerjee
- Catriel Beeri
- Avrim Blum
- Eric A. Brewer
- Andrei Z. Broder
- Michael F. Cohen
- Larry L. Constantine
- Danny Dolev
- Rodney Graham Downey
- Edward A. Feigenbaum
- Edward W. Felten
- Lance Fortnow
- Guang R. Gao
- Georg Gottlob
- Richard Hull
- Daniel P. Huttenlocher
- Tao Jiang
- John C. Klensin
- Monica S. Lam
- Marc Levoy
- Bhubaneswar Mishra
- J. Eliot B. Moss
- Rajeev Motwani
- Martin Odersky
- Gary M. Olson
- David Padua
- Randy Pausch
- Amir Pnueli
- Viktor K. Prasanna
- Aristides Requicha
- Eric S. Roberts
- Michael S. Scarborough
- Demetri Terzopoulos
- Donald E. Thomas
- Philip Wadler
- Mitchell Wand
- Zhang Hongjiang

=== 2008 ===
- Martín Abadi
- Gregory D. Abowd
- Alexander S. Aiken
- Sanjeev Arora
- Hari Balakrishnan
- William A. S. Buxton
- Kenneth L. Clarkson
- Jason Cong
- Perry Cook
- Stephen A. Cook
- Jack W. Davidson
- Umeshwar Dayal
- Xiaotie Deng
- J. J. Garcia-Luna-Aceves
- Michel X. Goemans
- Patrick Hanrahan
- Charles H. House
- Watts S. Humphrey
- Alan C. Kay
- Joseph A. Konstan
- Roy Levin
- P. Geoffrey Lowney
- Jitendra Malik
- Kathryn S. McKinley
- Bertrand Meyer
- John C. Mitchell
- Joel Moses
- J. Ian Munro
- Judith S. Olson
- Lawrence C. Paulson
- Hamid Pirahesh
- Brian Randell
- Michael K. Reiter
- Jennifer Rexford
- Jonathan S. Rose
- Mendel Rosenblum
- Rob A. Rutenbar
- Tuomas W. Sandholm
- Vivek Sarkar
- Mark S. Squillante
- Per Stenström
- Madhu Sudan
- Richard Szeliski
- Douglas B. Terry

=== 2009 ===
- Hagit Attiya
- David F. Bacon
- Ricardo A. Baeza-Yates
- Chandrajit L. Bajaj
- Vijay P. Bhatkar
- José A. Blakeley
- Gaetano Borriello
- Alok Choudhary
- Nell B. Dale
- Bruce S. Davie
- Jeffrey Dean
- Thomas Dean
- Bruce Randall Donald
- Thomas D. Erickson
- Gerhard Fischer
- Ian Foster
- Andrew V. Goldberg
- Michael T. Goodrich
- Venu Govindaraju
- Rajiv Gupta
- Joseph M. Hellerstein
- Laurie J. Hendren
- Urs Hölzle
- Farnam Jahanian
- Erich Kaltofen
- David R. Karger
- Arie E. Kaufman
- Hans-Peter Kriegel
- Maurizio Lenzerini
- John C.S. Lui
- Dinesh Manocha
- Margaret Martonosi
- Yossi Matias
- Renée J. Miller
- John T. Riedl
- Martin C. Rinard
- Patricia G. Selinger
- R. K. Shyamasundar
- Shang-Hua Teng
- Chandramohan A. Thekkath
- Robbert van Renesse
- Baba C. Vemuri
- Paulo Veríssimo
- Martin Vetterli
- Kyu-Young Whang
- Yorick Alexander Wilks
- Terry Winograd

=== 2010 ===
- David Abramson
- Sarita Adve
- Lorenzo Alvisi
- Luiz André Barroso
- Doug Burger
- Jennifer Chayes
- Peter M. Chen
- Anne Condon
- Mark Crovella
- Ron K. Cytron
- Michael Dahlin
- Amr El Abbadi
- Carla S. Ellis
- Christos Faloutsos
- Kathleen Fisher
- James Goodman
- Wendy Hall
- Jean-Pierre Hubaux
- Michael I. Jordan
- Lydia E. Kavraki
- Sara Kiesler
- Philip N. Klein
- Donald Kossmann
- John Launchbury
- Richard F. Lyon
- Raymond J. Mooney
- S. Muthukrishnan
- Fernando Pereira
- Pavel Pevzner
- Dieter Rombach
- David S. Rosenblum
- Stefan Savage
- Robert B. Schnabel
- Daniel A. Spielman
- Subhash Suri
- Frank Wm. Tompa
- Josep Torrellas
- Stephen Trimberger
- David M. Ungar
- Andreas Zeller
- Shumin Zhai

=== 2011 ===
- Serge Abiteboul
- Divyakant Agrawal
- Ronald Baecker
- Thomas J. Ball
- Guy Blelloch
- Carl Ebeling
- David Eppstein
- Geoffrey Charles Fox
- George W. Furnas
- David K. Gifford
- Ramesh Govindan
- Baining Guo
- David Heckerman
- Gerard J. Holzmann
- Hugues Hoppe
- Christian S. Jensen
- Howard J. Karloff
- Stephen W. Keckler
- Peter B. Key
- Scott Kirkpatrick
- Robert E. Kraut
- Susan Landau
- Ming C. Lin
- Peter S. Magnusson
- Dahlia Malkhi
- Keith Marzullo
- Satoshi Matsuoka
- Max Nelson
- Joe Mitchell
- Shubu Mukherjee
- Beng Chin Ooi
- Zehra Meral Ozsoyoglu
- János Pach
- Linda Petzold
- Martha E. Pollack
- Dan Roth
- John W Sanguinetti
- Margo Seltzer
- Amit Singhal
- Diane L. Souvaine
- Divesh Srivastava
- Dan Suciu
- Dean M. Tullsen
- Amin Vahdat
- David Wetherall
- Frank Kenneth Zadeck

=== 2012 ===
- Gustavo Alonso
- Lars Arge
- Pierre Baldi
- Hans-J. Boehm
- Craig Boutilier
- Tracy Camp
- Rick Cattell
- Larry Davis
- Ahmed K. Elmagarmid
- Wenfei Fan
- Lixin Gao
- Simson Garfinkel
- Garth A. Gibson
- Saul Greenberg
- Markus Gross
- David Grove
- Jonathan Grudin
- Rachid Guerraoui
- Manish Gupta
- John Hershberger
- Andrew B. Kahng
- Anna R. Karlin
- Srinivasan Keshav
- Gregor Kiczales
- Masaru Kitsuregawa
- Leonid Libkin
- Tova Milo
- Klara Nahrstedt
- Joseph O'Rourke
- Benjamin C. Pierce
- Keshav K Pingali
- Andrew M. Pitts
- Rajeev Rastogi
- Raj Reddy
- Keith W. Ross
- Karem A. Sakallah
- Robert Schreiber
- Scott Stevens
- Bart Selman
- Ron Shamir
- Yoav Shoham
- Joseph Sifakis
- Alistair Sinclair
- Clifford Stein
- Ion Stoica
- Roberto Tamassia
- Walter F. Tichy
- Patrick Valduriez
- Leslie G. Valiant
- Kathy Yelick
- Ramin Zabih
- Xiaodong Zhang

=== 2013 ===
- Mark S. Ackerman
- Charu C. Aggarwal
- James H. Anderson
- Mihir Bellare
- Christine L. Borgman
- Stefano Ceri
- Krishnendu Chakrabarty
- Ramalingam Chellappa
- Ingemar J. Cox
- Carlos J. P. de Lucena
- Rina Dechter
- Chip Elliott
- David Forsyth
- Wen Gao
- David Garlan
- James Gosling
- Peter J. Haas
- Marti A. Hearst
- Matthias Jarke
- Sampath Kannan
- David J. Kasik
- Dina Katabi
- Henry A. Kautz
- Jon Kleinberg
- Panganamala Ramana Kumar
- Douglas S. Lea
- Yoelle Maarek
- Christopher D. Manning
- Madhav Marathe
- John Mellor-Crummey
- Greg Morrisett
- Andrew C. Myers
- Dana S. Nau
- Satish Rao
- Stephen Robertson
- Timothy Roscoe
- Timoleon K. Sellis
- Dennis Shasha
- Nir N. Shavit
- Kyuseok Shim
- Padhraic Smyth
- Milind Tambe
- Val Tannen
- David P. Williamson
- Limsoon Wong
- Moti Yung
- Ellen W. Zegura
- Zhengyou Zhang
- Yuanyuan Zhou
- David Zuckerman

=== 2014 ===
- Samson Abramsky
- Vikram Adve
- Foto N. Afrati
- Charles W. Bachman
- Allan Borodin
- Alan Bundy
- Lorrie Faith Cranor
- Timothy A. Davis
- Srini Devadas
- Inderjit S. Dhillon
- Nikil D. Dutt
- Faith Ellen
- Michael D. Ernst
- Adam Finkelstein
- Juliana Freire
- Johannes Gehrke
- Eric Grimson
- Mark Guzdial
- Gernot Heiser
- Eric Horvitz
- Thorsten Joachims
- Michael Kearns
- Valerie King
- Sarit Kraus
- Leslie Lamport
- Sharad Malik
- Yishay Mansour
- Subhasish Mitra
- Michael Mitzenmacher
- Robert Morris
- Vijaykrishnan Narayanan
- Shamkant B. Navathe
- Jignesh M. Patel
- Ranganathan Parthasarathy
- Omer Reingold
- Tom Rodden
- Ronitt Rubinfeld
- Daniela Rus
- Alberto Luigi Sangiovanni-Vincentelli
- Henning Schulzrinne
- Stuart M. Shieber
- Ramakrishnan Srikant
- Aravind Srinivasan
- S. Sudarshan
- Paul Syverson
- Gene Tsudik
- Steve Whittaker

=== 2015 ===
- Anastasia Ailamaki
- Nancy M. Amato
- David M. Blei
- Naehyuck Chang
- Hsinchun Chen
- Mary Czerwinski
- Giuseppe De Giacomo
- Paul Dourish
- Cynthia Dwork
- Kevin Fall
- Babak Falsafi
- Michael Franz
- Orna Grumberg
- Ramanathan V. Guha
- Jayant R. Haritsa
- Julia Hirschberg
- Piotr Indyk
- Tei-Wei Kuo
- Xavier Leroy
- Chih-Jen Lin
- Bing Liu
- Yunhao Liu
- Michael George Luby
- Michael R. Lyu
- Ueli Maurer
- Patrick Drew McDaniel
- Victor Miller
- Elizabeth Mynatt
- Judea Pearl
- Jian Pei
- Frank Pfenning
- Dragomir R. Radev
- Sriram Rajamani
- Pablo Rodriguez
- Mooly Sagiv
- Peter Schröder
- Assaf Schuster
- Kevin Skadron
- Wang-Chiew Tan
- Santosh Vempala
- Tandy Warnow
- Michael Wooldridge

=== 2016 ===
- Noga Alon
- Paul Barford
- Luca Benini
- Ricardo Bianchini
- Stephen Blackburn
- Dan Boneh
- Carla Brodley
- Justine Cassell
- Erik Demaine
- Allison Druin
- Frédo Durand
- Nick Feamster
- Jason Flinn
- William Freeman
- Yolanda Gil
- Robert Lee Grossman
- Rajesh K. Gupta
- James Hendler
- Monika Henzinger
- Tony Hey
- Xuedong Huang
- Daniel Jackson
- Robert J. K. Jacob
- Somesh Jha
- Ravindran Kannan
- Anne-Marie Kermarrec
- Martin L. Kersten
- Christos Kozyrakis
- Marta Kwiatkowska
- James Landay
- K. Rustan M. Leino
- J. Bryan Lyles
- Todd C. Mowry
- Trevor Mudge
- Sharon Oviatt
- Venkata Padmanabhan
- Shwetak Patel
- David Peleg
- Radia Perlman
- Adrian Perrig
- Ganesan Ramalingam
- Louiqa Raschid
- Holly Rushmeier
- Michael Saks
- Sachin S. Sapatnekar
- Abigail Sellen
- Sudipta Sengupta
- André Seznec
- Valerie E. Taylor
- Carlo Tomasi
- Paul van Oorschot
- Manuela M. Veloso
- Zhou Zhi-Hua

=== 2017 ===
- Lars Birkedal
- Edouard Bugnion
- Margaret Burnett
- Shih-Fu Chang
- Edith Cohen
- Dorin Comaniciu
- Susan M. Dray
- Edward A. Fox
- Richard M. Fujimoto
- Shafi Goldwasser
- Carla Gomes
- Martin Grohe
- Aarti Gupta
- Venkatesan Guruswami
- Dan Gusfield
- Gregory D. Hager
- Steven Michael Hand
- Mor Harchol-Balter
- Laxmikant Kale
- Michael Kass
- Angelos Dennis Keromytis
- Carl Kesselman
- Edward Knightly
- Craig Knoblock
- Insup Lee
- Wenke Lee
- Li Erran Li
- Gabriel H. Loh
- Tomás Lozano-Pérez
- Clifford Lynch
- Yi Ma
- Andrew McCallum
- Silvio Micali
- Andreas Moshovos
- Gail C. Murphy
- Onur Mutlu
- Nuria Oliver
- Balaji Prabhakar
- Tal Rabin
- K. K. Ramakrishnan
- Ravi Ramamoorthi
- Yvonne Rogers
- Yong Rui
- Bernhard Schölkopf
- Steven M. Seitz
- Michael Sipser
- Anand Sivasubramaniam
- Mani B. Srivistava
- Alexander Vardy
- Geoffrey M. Voelker
- Martin D. F. Wong
- Qiang Yang
- Cheng Xiang Zhai
- Aidong Zhang

=== 2018 ===
- Gul Agha
- Krste Asanović
- N. Asokan
- Paul Barham
- Peter L. Bartlett
- David Basin
- Elizabeth Belding
- Rastislav Bodik
- Katy Börner
- Amy S. Bruckman
- Jan Camenisch
- Adnan Darwiche
- André DeHon
- Premkumar T. Devanbu
- Tamal Dey
- Sandhya Dwarkadas
- Steven K. Feiner
- Tim Finin
- Thomas Funkhouser
- Minos Garofalakis
- Mario Gerla
- Juan E. Gilbert
- Mohammad Hajiaghayi
- Dan Halperin
- Johan Håstad
- Tian He
- Wendi Heinzelman
- Aaron Hertzmann
- Jessica Hodgins
- John Hughes
- Charles Lee Isbell Jr.
- Kimberly Keeton
- Sanjeev Khanna
- Lillian Lee
- F. Thomson Leighton
- Fei-Fei Li
- Michael L. Littman
- Huan Liu
- Jiebo Luo
- Bruce Maggs
- Bangalore S. Manjunath
- Vishal Misra
- Frank Mueller
- David Parkes
- Gurudatta Parulkar
- Toniann Pitassi
- Lili Qiu
- Matthew Roughan
- Amit Sahai
- Alex Snoeren
- Gerald Tesauro
- Bhavani Thuraisingham
- Salil Vadhan
- Ellen Voorhees
- Avi Wigderson
- Alec Wolman

=== 2019 ===
- Scott Aaronson
- Tarek F. Abdelzaher
- Saman Amarasinghe
- Kavita Bala
- Magdalena Bałazińska
- Paul Beame
- Emery D. Berger
- Ronald F. Boisvert
- Christian Cachin
- Brad Calder
- Diego Calvanese
- Srdjan Capkun
- Claire Cardie
- Timothy M. Chan
- K. Mani Chandy
- Xilin Chen
- Elizabeth F. Churchill
- Philip R. Cohen
- Vincent Conitzer
- Noshir Contractor
- Matthew B. Dwyer
- Elena Ferrari
- Michael J. Freedman
- Deborah Frincke
- Lise Getoor
- Maria L. Gini
- Subbarao Kambhampati
- Tamara G. Kolda
- Xiang-Yang Li
- Songwu Lu
- Wendy Mackay
- Diana Marculescu
- Sheila McIlraith
- Rada Mihalcea
- Robin Murphy
- Marc Najork
- Jason Nieh
- Hanspeter Pfister
- Timothy M. Pinkston
- Mihai Pop
- Andreas Reuter
- Jeffrey S. Rosenschein
- Srinivasan Seshan
- Prashant J. Shenoy
- Peter Shor
- Mona Singh
- Ramesh Sitaraman
- Dawn Song
- Salvatore J. Stolfo
- Dacheng Tao
- Moshe Tennenholtz
- Giovanni Vigna
- Nisheeth K. Vishnoi
- Darrell Whitley
- Yuan Xie
- Moustafa Amin Youssef
- Carlo A. Zaniolo
- Lidong Zhou

=== 2020 ===
- Wil van der Aalst
- Daniel Abadi
- James Allan
- Srinivas Aluru
- Andrea Arpaci-Dusseau
- Remzi Arpaci-Dusseau
- Suman Banerjee
- Manuel Blum
- Lionel Briand
- David Brooks
- Ran Canetti
- John Canny
- Anantha P. Chandrakasan
- Yao-Wen Chang
- Moses Charikar
- Yiran Chen
- Graham Cormode
- Patrick Cousot
- Mathieu Desbrun
- Whitfield Diffie
- Bonnie Dorr
- Nicholas Duffield
- Alan Edelman
- Thomas Eiter
- Cormac Flanagan
- Jodi Forlizzi
- Dieter Fox
- Sanjay Ghemawat
- Antonio González
- Andrew D. Gordon
- Steven Gribble
- Susanne Hambrusch
- Martin Hellman
- Nicholas Higham
- Tony Hoare
- Holger H. Hoos
- Ihab Ilyas
- Lizy John
- Joost-Pieter Katoen
- Nam Sung Kim
- Sven Koenig
- David Kotz
- Arvind Krishnamurthy
- Ravi Kumar
- Brian Neil Levine
- Kevin Leyton-Brown
- Xuelong Li
- Steven H. Low
- Chenyang Lu
- Samuel Madden
- Scott Mahlke
- David Maltz
- Volker Markl
- Maja Matarić
- Filippo Menczer
- Jose Meseguer
- Meredith Ringel Morris
- Nachiappan Nagappan
- Radhika Nagpal
- Moni Naor
- Chandrasekhar Narayanaswami
- Sam Noh
- Prakash Panangaden
- Sethuraman Panchanathan
- Manish Parashar
- Keshab K. Parhi
- Haesun Park
- Gordon Plotkin
- Michael O. Rabin
- Kui Ren
- Paul Resnick
- Mary Beth Rosson
- Steven Salzberg
- Sanjit Arunkumar Seshia
- Adi Shamir
- Heng Tao Shen
- Amit Sheth
- Adam D. Smith
- Olga Sorkine-Hornung
- Rick Stevens
- Peter Stone
- Yufei Tao
- Leandros Tassiulas
- Ken Thompson
- Andrew Tomkins
- Olga Troyanskaya
- Matthew Turk
- Toby Walsh
- Wei Wang
- Laurie Williams
- Cathy H. Wu
- Shuicheng Yan
- Wang Yi
- Michael Zyda
- Kun Zhou

=== 2021 ===
- Leonard Adleman
- David Bader
- Meenakshi Balakrishnan
- Nikolaj Bjørner
- Mark Braverman
- L. Jean Camp
- Edward Y. Chang
- Tanzeem Choudhury
- Daniel Cohen-Or
- Gautam Das
- Anind Dey
- Lieven Eeckhout
- Martin Farach-Colton
- Amos Fiat
- Hubertus Franke
- Batya Friedman
- Evgeniy Gabrilovich
- Judith Gal-Ezer
- Deepak Ganesan
- Anupam Gupta
- Zygmunt Haas
- Elad Hazan
- Xiaobo Sharon Hu
- Paola Inverardi
- Zachary Ives
- Sushil Jajodia
- Ranjit Jhala
- David R. Kaeli
- Jonathan Katz
- Robert Kleinberg
- Thomas Lengauer
- Feifei Li
- Hai Li
- Ninghui Li
- Tie-Yan Liu
- Steve Marschner
- Matthew T. Mason
- Dale A. Miller
- Elchanan Mossel
- Bernhard Nebel
- Rafail Ostrovsky
- Joel Ouaknine
- David Z. Pan
- Rosalind Picard
- Shaz Qadeer
- Glenn Ricart
- Tajana Rosing
- Robert B. Ross
- Szymon Rusinkiewicz
- Pierangela Samarati
- Sunita Sarawagi
- Bernt Schiele
- Mubarak Ali Shah
- Alla Sheffer
- Munindar P. Singh
- Aravinda P. Sistla
- Scott A. Smolka
- Jie Tang
- Mark Tehranipoor
- Luca Trevisan
- Wenping Wang
- Brent Waters
- Ryen W. White
- Jacob O. Wobbrock
- Tao Xie
- Ming-Hsuan Yang
- Mohammed Zaki
- Ben Y. Zhao
- Lin Zhong
- Shlomo Zilberstein
- Thomas Zimmermann

=== 2022 ===
- Maneesh Agrawala
- Anima Anandkumar
- David Atienza
- Boaz Barak
- Michel Beaudouin-Lafon
- Peter Boncz
- Luis Ceze
- Ranveer Chandra
- Nitesh Chawla
- Ed Chi
- Corinna Cortes
- Bill Curtis
- Constantinos Daskalakis
- Kalyanmoy Deb
- Bronis R. De Supinski
- Sebastian Elbaum
- Yuguang Fang
- Kevin Fu
- Craig Gotsman
- Ahmed E. Hassan
- Abdelsalam Helal
- Jörg Henkel
- Manuel V. Hermenegildo
- Michael Hicks
- Torsten Hoefler
- Jason I. Hong
- Sandy Irani
- Hiroshi Ishii
- Alfons Kemper
- Samir Khuller
- Farinaz Koushanfar
- C.-C. Jay Kuo
- Hang Li
- Jimmy Lin
- Radu Marculescu
- Mei Hong
- David Mount
- Gonzalo Navarro
- Rafael Pass
- Marc Pollefeys
- Alex Pothen
- Moinuddin Qureshi
- Ashutosh Sabharwal
- Timothy Sherwood
- Stefano Soatto
- John Stasko
- Zhendong Su
- Gary Sullivan
- Jaime Teevan
- Kentaro Toyama
- René Vidal
- Eric Xing
- Dong Yu
- Yizhou Yu
- Haitao Zheng
- Wenwu Zhu
- Denis Zorin

=== 2023 ===
- Aditya Akella
- Michael Backes
- Vineet Bafna
- Yoshua Bengio
- Maria-Florina Balcan
- Nikhil Bansal
- Mikhail Belkin
- Shai Ben-David
- Vaughn Timothy Betz
- Ramón Cáceres
- Chandra Chekuri
- Haibo Chen
- Yingying Chen
- Kenneth Ward Church
- Roger Dannenberg
- Xin Luna Dong
- Rolf Drechsler
- Wenliang Du
- Pradeep Dubey
- Anja Feldmann
- George Fitzmaurice
- Fedor Fomin
- Jeffrey S. Foster
- Jianfeng Gao
- Ian Goldberg
- Sumit Gulwani
- Zhu Han
- Geoffrey Hinton
- Nicole Immorlica
- Trent Jaeger
- Kenneth Koedinger
- Andreas Krause
- Christopher Ian Kruegel
- H. T. Kung
- Yann LeCun
- Tim Berners-Lee
- David Lo
- Wenjing Lou
- Kwan-Liu Ma
- Wei-Ying Ma
- Z. Morley Mao
- Deborah McGuinness
- Gérard G. Medioni
- Sharad Mehrotra
- Joseph Seffi Naor
- Shrikanth Narayanan
- Natasha Noy
- Corina Păsăreanu
- Massoud Pedram
- Anand Raghunathan
- Benjamin Raphael
- Dana Ron
- Tim Roughgarden
- David Sankoff
- Stefan Saroiu
- Albrecht Schmidt
- Björn Schuller
- Phoebe Sengers
- Elaine Shi
- Noah Snavely
- Ram D. Sriram
- Steffen Staab
- Alex Szalay
- Manik Varma
- XiaoFeng Wang
- Kilian Weinberger
- Emmett Witchel
- Xing Xie

=== 2024 ===
- Marc Alexa
- Marcelo Arenas
- Michael Bailey
- Arindam Banerjee
- Clark Barrett
- Susanne Bødker
- Satish Chandra
- Marsha Chechik
- Lei Chen
- Wei Chen
- Carla Fabiana Chiasserini
- Fred Chong
- Diane Joyce Cook
- Stephen David Crocker
- Brian Curless
- Luca de Alfaro
- Maarten de Rijke
- Edward J. Delp
- Falko Dressler
- Derek Dreyer
- Niklas Elmqvist
- Michal Feldman
- Nate Foster
- Ashish Goel
- Sudipto Guha
- Jeffrey Michael Heer
- Russell Housley
- Scott Hudson
- Mohan Kankanhalli
- Irwin King
- Cliff Lampe
- Stefano Leonardi
- Guoliang Li
- Azad M. Madni
- Tim J. Menzies
- Mira Mezini
- Sudip Misra
- Bashar A. Nuseibeh
- Peter W. O'Hearn
- Fatma Ozcan
- Rasmus Pagh
- Dhabaleswar K. Panda
- Naren Ramakrishnan
- Dana Randall
- Abhik Roychoudhury
- Claudio T. Silva
- Thad Starner
- Qi Tian
- Anwar Walid
- Haixun Wang
- Guoliang Xing
- Feng Zhao
- Jingren Zhou
- Justin Zobel
- Benjamin G. Zorn

=== 2025 ===
- Eytan Adar
- Gail-Joon Ahn
- Eric Allman
- Sven Apel
- Lujo Bauer
- Angela Bonifati
- Rajkumar Buyya
- George Candea
- Pei Cao
- Franck Cappello
- Luca Carloni
- Sheelagh Carpendale
- Swarat Chaudhuri
- Baoquan Chen
- Deming Chen
- Kwang-Ting Cheng
- Cristina Conati
- Marco Dorigo
- George Drettakis
- Nandita Dukkipati
- Javier Esparza
- Paolo Ferragina
- Yun Raymond Fu
- Michael L. Gleicher
- Wolfgang Heidrich
- Steve Hodges
- Zi Helen Huang
- Odest Chadwicke Jenkins
- Jiaya Jia
- Xiaohua Jia
- Hai Jin
- Ken-ichi Kawarabayashi
- Aggelos Kiayias
- Tadayoshi Kohno
- Wolfgang Lehner
- Jian Ma
- Ratul Mahajan
- Athina Markopoulou
- Nenad Medvidović
- Tao Mei
- Tommaso Melodia
- Dejan S. Milojičić
- Alistair M. Moffat
- Mohamed F. Mokbel
- Peter Müller
- Madanlal Musuvathi
- Noam Nisan
- Alessandro Orso
- Themis Palpanas
- Denys Poshyvanyk
- Ariel D. Procaccia
- Theodore Rappaport
- Sylvia Ratnasamy
- Oded Regev
- Cynthia Rudin
- Natarajan Shankar
- Yan Solihin
- Kate Starbird
- Gookwon Edward Suh
- Kian-Lee Tan
- Hanghang Tong
- Antonio Torralba
- Stephanie Weirich
- Adam Wierman
- Rebecca N. Wright
- Hui Xiong
- Li Xiong
- Junfeng Yang
- Ke Yi
- Yu Zheng
- Jun Zhu

== See also ==
- List of distinguished members of the Association for Computing Machinery
