= Paul Larson =

Paul Larson may refer to:

- Paul Larson (computer scientist), American computer scientist
- Paul Larson (American football) (1932–2022), American football player
- Paul Michael Larson, contestant in a record-breaking win on the American game show Press Your Luck

== See also ==
- Paul Larsen (born 1970), Australian sailor
