= William F. Miller =

American professor and businessman (1925–2017)

- Born: November 19, 1925; Vincennes, Indiana, US
- Died: September 27, 2017 (aged 91); Palo Alto, California, US
- Scientific career
- Institutions: Stanford University; SRI International
- Notable students: Victor R. Lesser; Lance J. Hoffman

William F. Miller (1925–2017) was an American academic who was professor public and private management emeritus and a professor of computer science emeritus. He was a vice president and provost of Stanford University from 1971 to 1979, and president and CEO of SRI International from 1979 to 1990. He died on September 27, 2017, at the age of 91.

== Early life and education ==
Miller was born on November 19, 1925, in Vincennes, Indiana. He attended Purdue University, where he earned a BS in 1949, an MS in experimental physics in 1951, and a PhD in theoretical physics in 1956.

== Career ==
Miller was a director of the Applied Mathematics Division at Argonne National Laboratory, where he worked on problems in computational science. Miller was recruited to the faculty of Stanford University in 1964 by Frederick Terman, who was Stanford's vice president and provost at the time. From 1971 to 1979, Miller was the vice president and provost of Stanford University. From 1979 to 1990, Miller was the president and CEO of SRI International, where he focused on expanding the organization's business in the Pacific Rim and acquired the Sarnoff Corporation as a subsidiary of SRI. Miller has been a member of numerous boards of directors, including but not limited to Wells Fargo, Borland International, McKenna Group, Palyn-Gould Group, Who Where?, Quest Gen and the BHP International Advisory Council. He was an initial investor in Mayfield Fund, an early venture capital organization.

== Awards and honors ==
Miller was given an honorary Doctor of Science degree from his alma mater, Purdue University, in 1972. In 1989, Tau Beta Pi recognized him as an Eminent Engineer.
