= Karen Duncan =

Biostatistician and health informatician

- Education: University of Oklahoma
- Awards: 2000 ACM Fellow
- Scientific career
- Fields: Biostatistics; health informatics
- Workplaces: Medical University of South Carolina; Mitre Corporation

Karen A. Duncan is a biostatistician and health informatics specialist, who was named a Fellow of the Association for Computing Machinery in 2000.

Duncan earned a Ph.D. in biostatistics from the University of Oklahoma. She has worked as an associate professor at the Medical University of South Carolina, as a member of the technical staff at the Mitre Corporation, and as an independent consultant.

Duncan is the author of the books Health Information and Health Reform: Understanding the Need for a National Health Information System (Jossey-Bass, 1994) and Community Health Information Systems: Lessons for the Future (Health Information Press, 1998).
