= Philip Klein =

Philip Klein may refer to:

- Philip Klein (composer), American film and television composer
- Philip Klein (editor), American journalist and editor
- Philip Klein (rabbi) (1849–1926), Hungarian-American rabbi
- Philip Klein (screenwriter) (1889–1935), American screenwriter
- Philip N. Klein, American computer scientist
