= Shahid Hussain Bokhari =

Pakistani computer scientist

Shahid Hussain Bohkhari
- Born: 17 January 1952 (age 74); Lahore, Pakistan
- Education: University of Engineering and Technology, Lahore, Pakistan; University of Massachusetts Amherst, USA
- Known for: Computer Development
- Scientific career
- Fields: Electrical and Computer Engineering
- Workplaces: University of Engineering and Technology, Lahore; National Aeronautics and Space Administration; Electrotechnical Laboratory in Tsukuba, Japan; University of Stuttgart, Germany; University of Vienna, Austria

Shahid H. Bokhari (born 17 January 1952 in Lahore, Pakistan) is a highly cited Pakistani researcher in the field of parallel and distributed computing. He is a fellow of both IEEE and ACM. Bokhari's ACM Fellow citation states that he received the award for his "research contributions to automatic load balancing and partitioning of distributed processes", while his IEEE Fellow award recognises his "contributions to the mapping problem in parallel and distributed computing".

At the time of his retirement in 2005, Bokhari was the only IEEE/ACM Fellow and the only Pakistani ISI Highly Cited Researcher resident in Pakistan. Bokhari's resignation led to a letter-writing campaign by several of his former students who were dismayed at what they claimed to be mismanagement at the state-run Pakistani universities.

== Early life and education ==
Bokhari was born on 17 January, 1952 in Lahore, Pakistan. He is the son of Mr. Riyaz Hussain Bokhari, who was a federal secretary, Auditor General of Pakistan, chairman of the National Fertilizer Corporation (NFC) and also worked at the Packages Group, Pakistan.

His daughter, Saniyah S. Bokhari, has also published in the field of high-performance computing

Bokhari received his B.Sc. in electrical engineering from the University of Engineering and Technology, Lahore in 1974.

He then received his MS and PhD in electrical and computer engineering from the University of Massachusetts Amherst in 1976 and 1978, respectively.

His Ph.D. supervisor at the University of Massachusetts Amherst was Professor Harold S. Stone. Bokhari was a visiting researcher at the Department of Biomedical Informatics, Ohio State University

== Career ==
He was with the Department of Electrical Engineering, University of Engineering and Technology, Lahore, Pakistan, from 1980 to 2005 where he held the position of a professor. He also served as director of the Computer Systems Laboratory, Communications Laboratory and the postgraduate program at the Department of Electrical Engineering as well as the directorate of Research Extension & Advisory Services of the University of Engineering and Technology, Lahore.

He (purportedly) tendered his resignation from the Department of Electrical Engineering, University of Engineering and Technology, Lahore, over a dispute with the administration, notably, the then vice-chancellor, Lieutenant General (retired) M. Akram, and the chairman, Department of Electrical Engineering and his dissatisfaction with the policies of the Higher Education Commission (HEC) of Pakistan. Bokhari maintains that he did not resign under protest for not being appointed chairman of department, although his critics claim otherwise.

Bokhari has been associated with the Institute for Computer Applications in Science & Engineering (ICASE) at NASA Langley Research Center in Hampton, Virginia, where he spent a total of about seven years as a visiting scientist or consultant over the period 1978–1998.

Other institutions that he has been associated with as a researcher include the University of Colorado (USA), Stuttgart University (Germany), University of Vienna (Austria), and the Electrotechnical Laboratory in Tsukuba, Japan.

== Research Interests ==
Bokhari's research interests include parallel and distributed computing, applied to computational biology and bioinformatics. He is, particularly, interested in parallel algorithms for DNA alignment and assembly.

One of Bokhari's most-cited research publication: "On the Mapping Problem" (1981) concerns the assignment of subtasks for distributed computation to processors in such a way that the subtasks that communicate with each other are, to the extent possible, assigned to the processors that are adjacent to each other within the communication network. His paper relates this problem to more abstract graph-theoretical problems, in particular, graph isomorphism. He also relates the problem to the representation of sparse linear systems as band matrices with low bandwidth, and to the quadratic assignment problem. This is the work for which Bokhari was cited in his IEEE Fellow award.

Several other highly cited papers of Bokhari concern the partitioning and load balancing problems in distributed computing, the topic mentioned in his ACM Fellow award citation. As with the Mapping Problem, this concerns assignment of tasks to processors, but in a more general setting in which a processor may handle multiple tasks; the problem is to perform this assignment in such a way that heavily communicating pairs of tasks are assigned to the same processor, while keeping the amount of work assigned to processors relatively even.

Bokhari's research with Marsha Berger (Berger and Bokhari 1987) concerns versions of the partitioning problem in which different tasks may have greatly differing workloads; he gives as an application the distributed solution of nonlinear partial differential equations. The technique introduced in this paper, recursive co-ordinate bisection, repeatedly divides the geometric problem domain along co-ordinate axes into two subdomains of equal workload until the number of subdomains formed equals the number of processors. However, as Simon writes, although this method is conceptually very simple it tends to produce long and thin or even disconnected subdomains. A later refinement of this technique, parametric binary dissection (Bokhari, Crockett, and Nicol 1993) combines shape information with load balancing in its partitioning decisions in an attempt to mitigate this problem. Another of Bokhari's papers (Bokhari 1988), his third most-highly cited, provides an algorithm that optimally solves the partitioning problem for several broad classes of distributed algorithm.

== Selected works ==
=== Books ===
- Bokhari, Shahid H. (1987). Assignment Problems in Parallel and Distributed Computing. Boston: Kluwer Academic Publishers. ISBN 0-89838-240-8. 95 citations.

=== Papers ===
- Bokhari, Shahid H.; Stone, Harold (1978). "Control of distributed processes". IEEE Computer. 11 (7): 97–106. doi:10.1109/C-M.1978.218272. S2CID 10098900. 45 citations.
- Bokhari, Shahid H. (1979). "Dual processor scheduling with dynamic reassignment". IEEE Transactions on Software Engineering. SE-5 (4): 341–349. doi:10.1109/TSE.1979.234201. S2CID 6398080. 41 citations.
- Bokhari, Shahid H. (1981). "On the mapping problem". IEEE Transactions on Computers. C-30 (3): 207–214. doi:10.1109/TC.1981.1675756. S2CID 26166229. 245 citations.
- Bokhari, Shahid H. (1981). "A shortest tree algorithm for optimal assignments across space and time in a distributed processor system". IEEE Transactions on Software Engineering. SE-7 (11): 583–589. doi:10.1109/TSE.1981.226469. S2CID 17130855. 73 citations.
- Bokhari, Shahid H. (1984). "Finding maximum on an array processor with a global bus". IEEE Transactions on Computers. C-33 (2): 133–139. doi:10.1109/TC.1984.1676405. S2CID 903315. 61 citations.
- Berger, Marsha; Bokhari, Shahid H. (1987). "A partitioning strategy for non-uniform problems across multiprocessors". IEEE Transactions on Computers. C-36 (5): 570–580. doi:10.1109/TC.1987.1676942. hdl:2060/19860010476. S2CID 21973139. 298 citations.
- Bokhari, Shahid H. (1988). "Partitioning problems in parallel, pipelined and distributed computing". IEEE Transactions on Computers. C-37 (1): 48–57. doi:10.1109/12.75137. 140 citations.
- Bokhari, Shahid H. (1990). "Communication overheads on the Intel iPSC-860 hypercube". ICASE Interim Report 10. 49 citations.
- Berryman, H.; Bokhari, Shahid H. (1992). "Complete exchange on a circuit-switched mesh". Proceedings of the Scalable High Performance Computing Conference. pp. 300–306. 49 citations.

A longer list of his publications is available from the DBLP Bibliography Server. Citation counts are derived from a Google Scholar search.
