= Angela Bonifati =

Italian computer scientist

Angela Bonifati is an Italian computer scientist who specializes in databases and big data, including XML data, graph databases, data integration, and the structure of database queries. She works in France as a distinguished professor at Claude Bernard University Lyon 1, head of database research at the Laboratoire d'Informatique en Images et Systèmes (LIRIS) operated jointly by Claude Bernard University and the French National Centre for Scientific Research (CNRS), and a senior member of the Institut Universitaire de France. She also holds an affiliation with the University of Waterloo in Canada as an adjunct professor of computer science.

== Education and career ==
Bonifati has a 1997 master's degree from the University of Calabria, and a 2002 Ph.D. from the Polytechnic University of Milan.

After postdoctoral research at the French Institute for Research in Computer Science and Automation (Inria), she became a research scientist for the Italian National Research Council (CNR) and an associate professor at the University of Basilicata in Italy.

In 2011 she moved to France to work at the Lille University of Science and Technology. She took her present position at Claude Bernard University Lyon 1 in 2015. In 2023, she became a senior member of the Institut Universitaire de France.

== Books ==
Bonifati is a coauthor of:

- Schema Matching and Mapping (with Z. Bellahsene and E. Rahm, Springer, 2011)
- Querying Graphs (with G. Fletcher, H. Voigt and N. Yakovets, Morgan & Claypool, 2018)

== Recognition ==
Bonifati was the 2023 recipient of the IEEE TCDE Impact Award of the IEEE Technical Committee on Data Engineering, given "for contributions to the active and interdisciplinary areas of graph databases, knowledge graphs and data integration and their impact on data-intensive systems". She was the 2025 recipient of the VLDB Women in Database Research Award, given at the 51st International Conference on Very Large Data Bases.

She was named as an ACM Fellow, in the 2025 class of fellows, "for contributions to the foundations of graph databases and data integration".
