= Martin D. F. Wong =

American and Chinese academic

- 黃定發
- Born: Martin Ding Fat Wong
- Education: University of Toronto (BSc, Mathematics, 1979); University of Illinois at Urbana-Champaign (MS, Mathematics, 1981; PhD, Computer Science, 1987)
- Known for: Algorithmic aspects of computer-aided design (CAD) of integrated circuits
- Awards: IEEE Fellow (2006); ACM Fellow (2017); Donald O. Pederson Best Paper Award for IEEE Transactions on CAD (2000)
- Scientific career
- Fields: Computer science; Electrical engineering
- Workplaces: Provost and Chair Professor of Computer Science, Hong Kong Baptist University; Dean of Engineering and Choh-Ming Li Professor, Chinese University of Hong Kong; Executive Associate Dean and Edward C. Jordan Professor of ECE, University of Illinois at Urbana-Champaign; Bruton Centennial Professor of Computer Science, University of Texas at Austin
- Doctoral advisor: Chung Laung Liu

Martin Ding Fat Wong is an American and Chinese computer scientist, electrical engineer, and university administrator. He is the Provost of the Hong Kong Baptist University (HKBU). Wong is known for his contributions to computer-aided design of integrated circuits.

== University career ==
Wong received his Ph.D. degree in Computer Science from University of Illinois at Urbana-Champaign (UIUC) in 1987 advised by Chung Laung Liu. Between 1987 and 2002, he was a Bruton Centennial Professor of Computer Science at the University of Texas at Austin. He returned to UIUC in 2002 as the Edward C. Jordan Professor of Electrical and Computer Engineering. In 2012, he became the Executive Associate Dean of the College of Engineering. In 2019, he moved to the Chinese University of Hong Kong (CUHK), where he became the Choh-Ming Li Professor of Computer Science and Engineering and the Dean of the Faculty of Engineering. In 2023, Wong became the Provost of Hong Kong Baptist University (HKBU) and a Chair Professor of Computer Science there. He has published over 500 scholarly papers and graduated 65 Ph.D. students in EDA

== Technical contributions ==
Many of Wong's technical contributions are in algorithms for physical design of integrated circuits. He developed the use of simulated annealing in floorplan (microelectronics) design as well as algorithms for wire routing and circuit partitioning. Wong also worked on FPGA design and efficient GPU implementations of classical algorithms, such as breadth-first search.

== Awards ==
Wong was named an IEEE Fellow in 2006 "for contributions to algorithmic aspects of computer-aided design (CAD) of very large scale integrated (VLSI) circuits and systems." He was named an ACM Fellow in 2017 "for contributions to the algorithmic aspects of electronic design automation (EDA)".

In 2000, Wong shared a IEEE Transactions on Computer-Aided Design of Integrated Circuits and Systems Donald O. Pederson Best Paper Award for the paper on simultaneous buffer insertion and sizing and wire sizing.
