= Mikhail Atallah =

Lebanese-American computer scientist

- Education: Johns Hopkins University
- Scientific career
- Fields: Computer Science
- Workplaces: Purdue University
- Doctoral advisor: S. Rao Kosaraju
- Doctoral students: Wenliang Du; Michael T. Goodrich

Mikhail Jibrayil (Mike) Atallah is a Lebanese American computer scientist, a distinguished professor of computer science at Purdue University.

== Biography ==
Atallah received his bachelor's degree in electrical engineering and computer science from the American University of Beirut in 1975. He then moved to Johns Hopkins University for his graduate studies, earning a master's degree in 1980 and a Ph.D. in 1982 under the supervision of S. Rao Kosaraju, both in electrical engineering and computer science. Since that time he has been a member of the Purdue University faculty.

In 2001, Atallah co-founded Arxan Technologies, Inc., a provider of internet anti-piracy and anti-tampering software, and in 2007, he became its chief technology officer.

== Research ==
Atallah has published over 200 papers on topics in algorithms and computer security.

Atallah's thesis work was on the subject of parallel algorithms, and he continued working in that area as a faculty member. Algorithmic research by Atallah includes papers on parallel and dynamic computational geometry, finding the symmetries of geometric figures, divide and conquer algorithms, and efficient parallel computations of the Levenshtein distance between pairs of strings. With his student Marina Blanton, Atallah is the editor of the Algorithms and Theory of Computation Handbook (CRC Press, 2nd ed., 2009, ISBN 978-1-58488-818-5).

Atallah's more recent research has been in the area of computer security. His work in this area has included techniques for text-based digital watermarking. and the addition of multiple guard points within software as an anti-piracy measure.

== Awards and honors ==
In 2006, Atallah was elected as a fellow of the Association for Computing Machinery for his "contributions to parallel and distributed computation". He has been a fellow of the IEEE since 1997. Previously he received a Presidential Young Investigator Award from the National Science Foundation in 1985.
