= Christian S. Jensen =

Danish computer scientist

- Born: 1963 (age 62–63); Vester Hassing, Denmark
- Education: Aalborg University
- Occupation: Professor
- Honours: Knight of the Order of the Dannebrog (2016); ACM Fellow (2011); IEEE Fellow (2008); Member of Danish Academy of Technical Sciences, Royal Danish Academy of Sciences and Letters, and Academia Europaea

Christian S. Jensen (born 1963) is a Danish computer scientist who is a professor at Aalborg University.

Jensen's research focuses on temporal, spatial, spatio-temporal, geo-textual, and multidimensional data; data management, analytics, machine learning; data models, query languages, database design, query and update processing and optimization, and indexing.

== Education ==
Jensen obtained his bachelor's degrees in mathematics (1985) and computer science (1986) and a master's degree in computer science (1988) at Aalborg University. He wrote his Ph.D. thesis at the University of Maryland (USA) and defended it at Aalborg in 1991. In 2000, he obtained the Danish Dr. Techn. degree from Aalborg .

== Career ==
Jensen has been a visiting scholar (1991–1992), visiting associate professor (1994–1995), and visiting professor (1999) at the University of Arizona. He has also been a visiting scientist at Google in Mountain View, California (2008–2009). From 2001 to 2011, he was Professor II at University of Agder in Norway; and from 2010 to 2013, he was professor at Aarhus University.

Jensen was a distinguished visiting professor at Sa Shixuan International Research Center for Big Data Management and Analytics, Renmin University of China (2012–2017) and honorary professor at Renmin (2013–2016) and Cardiff University, Department of Computer Science (2001–2006).

Jensen is an ACM Fellow (2011) and an IEEE Fellow (2008). He is a member of the Danish Academy of Technical Sciences (2001-), the Royal Danish Academy of Sciences and Letters (2010-), and Academia Europaea (2013-). Jensen is president of the steering committee of the Swiss National Research Program on Big Data (2015–2021).

In Norway, Jensen chairs the scientific advisory board of NorwAI, the Norwegian Research Center for AI Innovation (2020-); and in Germany, he serves on the scientific advisory board of the Max Planck Institute for Informatics, Saarbrücken (2019–2023). Finally, he serves on the board of directors of VILLUM FONDEN (since 2018).

Jensen has been editor-in-chief for The VLDB Journal (2008–2014) and ACM Transactions on Database Systems (2014–2020).

== Awards ==
- 2022 SIGMOD Contributions Award
- The 2019 IEEE TCDE Impact Award
- Knight, Order of Dannebrog (Ridder af Dannebrog), appointed by Queen Margrethe II of Denmark, 2016
- The Villum Kann Rasmussen Annual Award for Technical and Scientific Research 2011 (award accompanied by DKK 2,500,000)
- Telenor's Nordic Research Award 2002 (theme: "Mobility and wireless access to the Internet—technologies, new services, and applications;" award accompanied by NOK 250,000)
- Director Ib Henriksen's Research Award 2001 (award accompanied by DKK 250,000)

== Publications ==
Christian S. Jensen has published over 500 publications and is cited frequently.

=== Selected publications ===
- X. Cao, G. Cong, and C. S. Jensen, Efficient Processing of Spatial Group Keyword Queries, in ACM Transactions on Database Systems, 40(2), article 13, 48 pages, June 2015.
- X. Cao, G. Cong, C. S. Jensen, and M. L. Yiu, Retrieving Regions of Interest for User Exploration, in Proceedings of the VLDB Endowment, 7(9): 733–744, May 2014.
- C. S. Jensen, T. B. Pedersen, and C. Thomsen, Multidimensional Databases and Data Warehousing, Morgan & Claypool Publishers, 2010, 111 pages.
- G. Cong, C. S. Jensen, and D. Wu, Efficient Retrieval of the Top-k Most Relevant Spatial Web Objects, in Proceedings of the VLDB Endowment, 2(1–2): 337–348, 2009.
- R. Benetis, C. S. Jensen, G. Karciauskas, and S. Saltenis, Nearest Neighbor and Reverse Nearest Neighbor Queries for Moving Objects, The VLDB Journal, 15(3): 229–250, September 2006.
- R. H. Güting, M. Böhlen, M. Erwig, C. S. Jensen, N. Lorentzos, M. Schneider, and M. Vazirgiannis, A Foundation for Representing and Querying Moving Objects, ACM Transactions on Database Systems, 25(1): 1–42, March 2000.
- S. Saltenis, C. S. Jensen, S. Leutenegger, and M. Lopez, Indexing the Positions of Continuously Moving Objects, in Proceedings of the 2000 ACM SIGMOD International Conference on the Management of Data, 2000, pp. 331–342.
- M. Böhlen, C. S. Jensen, and R. T. Snodgrass, Temporal Statement Modifiers, ACM Transactions on Database Systems, 25(4): 407–456, December 2000.
- C. S. Jensen, Temporal Database Management, Faculty of Engineering and Science, Aalborg University, August 1999, 1328+xxxviii pages. Dr.Techn. thesis. (http://www.cs.aau.dk/˜csj/Thesis/)
- C. S. Jensen and R. T. Snodgrass, Semantics of Time-Varying Information, Information Systems, 21(4): 311–352, 1996.
