= Kevin Fu =

American professor of computer science

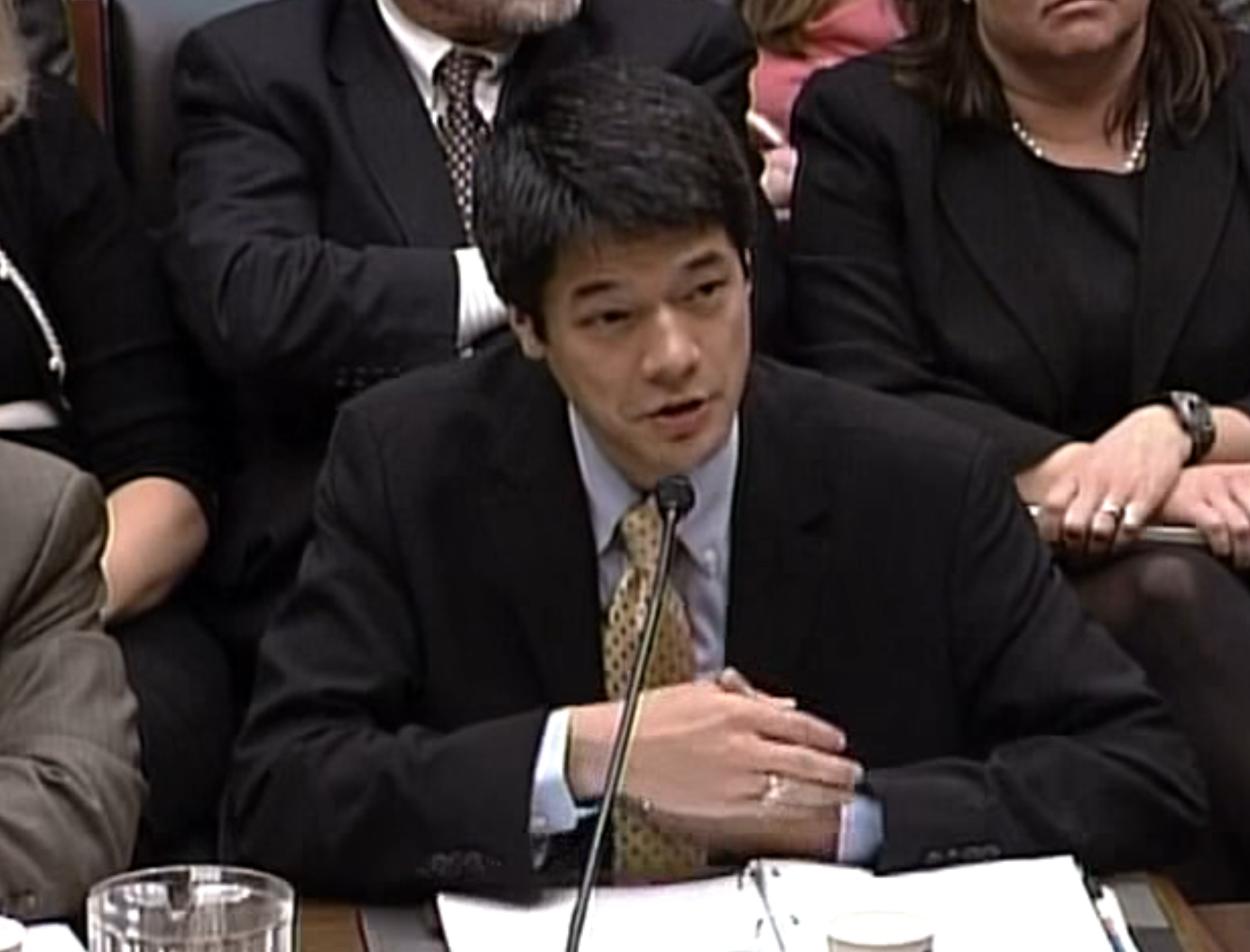
- Occupation: Professor

Academic work
- Discipline: Computer Science

Kevin Fu is a professor of computer science in the Khoury College of Computer Sciences at Northeastern University known for his contributions to computer security and security for medical devices.

== Education ==
Fu received his SB in computer science in 1998 and MEng in Electrical Engineering and Computer Science in 1999, both from Massachusetts Institute of Technology. Fu completed his PhD as well at MIT in 2005 with a thesis titled "Integrity and access control in untrusted content distribution networks" advised by Ron Rivest and Frans Kaashoek.

== Career ==
Before becoming a professor of computer science at Northeastern University in January 2023, he was a professor at the University of Michigan from 2013 to 2022.

Fu also held the position of the director of medical security at the FDA.

== Accomplishments ==
Fu helped establish the field of medical device security. He is widely credited for pioneering research that exposed vulnerabilities in implantable medical devices, notably beginning with his 2008 IEEE paper on defibrillator security. He founded and directs the Archimedes Center for Health Care and Medical Device Cybersecurity, which trains engineers and advances research to improve cybersecurity in FDA-regulated industries. Fu served as the inaugural Acting Director of Medical Device Cybersecurity at the U.S. Food and Drug Administration (FDA), where he led national efforts to strengthen the cybersecurity of medical devices, develop regulatory policy, and foster public-private partnerships.

Fu's research has directly influenced FDA regulations and industry standards. Fu has spent years informing policymakers and testifying before Congress, resulting in improved FDA regulations for medical device security.

== Awards and honors ==
- Fellow of the American Association for the Advancement of Science for distinguished contributions to science and its applications (2022)
- ACM Fellow (2022) for contributions to computer security and secure engineering of medical devices
- IEEE Fellow (2018) for contributions to embedded and medical device security
- NSF Career Award (2009 - 2013)
- Alfred P. Sloan Research Fellowship (2009–2011),
- MIT Technology Review TR35 Innovator of the Year (2009), for work on medical device security.
- Federal 100 (Fed100) Award (2013), recognizing significant impact on federal information technology.
- IEEE Security & Privacy Test of Time Award, for research on pacemaker security.
- Association for the Advancement of Medical Instrumentation (AAMI) & MedCrypt Cybersecurity Visionary Award (2023).
- Regents’ Award for Distinguished Public Service, University of Michigan (2017), for informing policymakers and Congress on computer security and medical device safety.
- Best Paper Awards from major conferences, including USENIX Security, IEEE Security & Privacy, and ACM SIGCOMM.

== Entrepreneurship and leadership ==
Fu is the co-founder and CEO of Virta Laboratories, Inc., a healthcare cybersecurity startup founded in 2013 that specializes in detecting malware and anomalies in Internet of Things (IoT) and medical devices. Virta Labs developed PowerGuard, a device that helps hospitals and medical device manufacturers detect cybersecurity threats through power consumption analysis, offering plug-and-play security for critical healthcare infrastructure.

Fu founded and directs the Archimedes Center for Health Care and Medical Device Cybersecurity at Northeastern University, which provides training and support to improve operational technology cybersecurity in FDA-regulated industries.

He has also held leadership roles in national and international organizations, including serving as the inaugural Acting Director of Medical Device Cybersecurity at the U.S. Food and Drug Administration (FDA), where he helped shape federal policy on medical device security.

Fu has chaired and served on editorial boards and steering committees, including the AAMI Biomedical Instrumentation & Technology Editorial Board, the ACM Committee on Computers and Public Policy, and the USENIX Security Steering Committee.

Fu has been involved in developing interdisciplinary medical device cybersecurity curricula and in creating the first FDA-recognized consensus standards for medical device manufacturing security.

Kevin Fu researches both technology and healthcare, emphasizing safety, security, and mentorship in cybersecurity and engineering.
