= Raymond J. Mooney =

American computer scientist

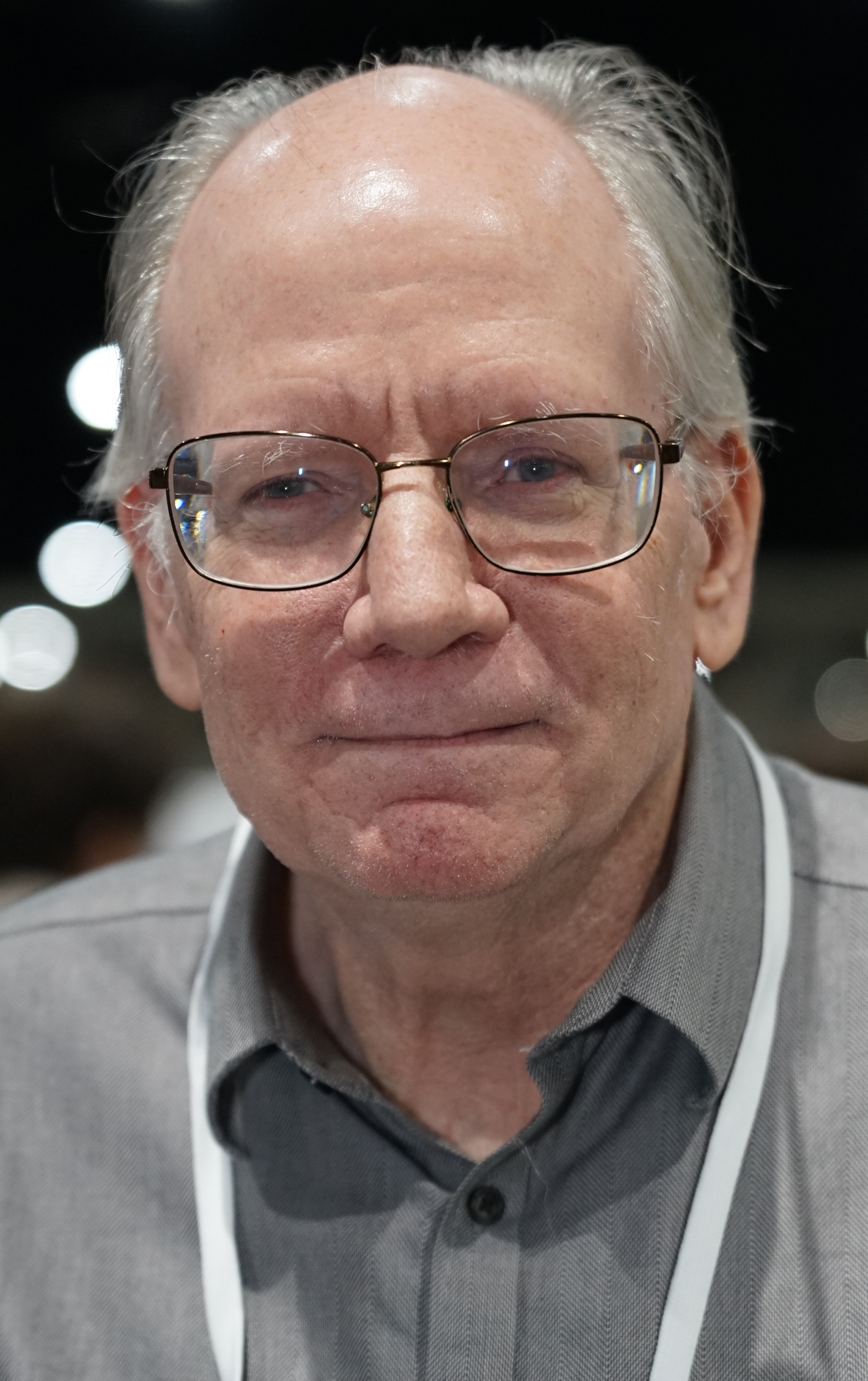
- Mooney in 2025
- Born: 1961–1962
- Education: University of Illinois at Urbana–Champaign
- Awards: AAAI Fellow (2005); ACM Fellow (2010); ACL Fellow (2014)
- Scientific career
- Fields: Computer Science, Natural Language Processing, Artificial Intelligence
- Workplaces: University of Texas at Austin
- Doctoral advisor: Gerald DeJong

Raymond J. Mooney is an American computer scientist, professor of computer science, and director of the Artificial Intelligence laboratory at the University of Texas at Austin. His research focuses on machine learning and natural language processing.

He was educated at O'Fallon Township High School in O'Fallon, Illinois and earned a BS, MS, and Ph.D. in computer science at the University of Illinois at Urbana-Champaign, where he was advised by Gerald DeJong.

He is a fellow of the Association for Computing Machinery (ACM), Association for Computational Linguistics (ACL), and Association for the Advancement of Artificial Intelligence (AAAI).
