= William Richards Adrion =

American academic

- Occupations: Computer scientist and Professor Emeritus at University of Massachusetts Amherst

William Richards Adrion is a computer scientist and Professor Emeritus at University of Massachusetts Amherst. He was named an ACM Fellow in 1996 and elected a fellow of the American Association for the Advancement of Science in 1995. He was a founding member and the first Editor-in-Chief of the ACM Transactions on Software Engineering and Methodology, and was also a founding member of the Computing Research Association.
