= Alla Sheffer =

Israeli researcher

Alla Sheffer FRSC
- Education: Hebrew University of Jerusalem
- Known for: Mesh parameterization, angle-based flattening
- Awards: Achievement Award (Canadian Human–Computer Communications Society, 2018), Fellow of the Royal Society of Canada (2020), ACM SIGGRAPH Academy (2020), Fellow of IEEE (2021), ACM Fellow (2021)
- Scientific career
- Fields: Computer Graphics, Geometric Modeling, Geometry Processing, Mesh Generation
- Workplaces: University of British Columbia
- Doctoral advisor: Michel Bercovier

Alla Sheffer FRSC is a Canadian researcher in computer graphics, geometric modeling, geometry processing, and mesh generation, particularly known for her research on mesh parameterization and angle-based flattening. She is currently a professor of computer science at the University of British Columbia.

== Education and career ==
Sheffer was educated at the Hebrew University of Jerusalem, earning a bachelor's degree in mathematics and computer science in 1991, a master's degree in computer science in 1995, and a Ph.D. in computer science in 1999. Her dissertation, Geometric Modeling and Applied Computational Geometry, was supervised by Michel Bercovier.

After postdoctoral research at the University of Illinois at Urbana–Champaign, she became an assistant professor at the Technion – Israel Institute of Technology in 2001. She moved to the University of British Columbia in 2003, and became a full professor there in 2013.

== Recognition ==
The Canadian Human–Computer Communications Society gave Sheffer their Achievement Award in 2018, "for her numerous highly impactful contributions to the field of computer graphics research".

In 2020, Sheffer was elected as a Fellow of the Royal Society of Canadaand a member of the ACM SIGGRAPH Academy. In 2021, she was elected as a Fellow of IEEE. She was named a 2021 ACM Fellow "for contributions to geometry processing, mesh parameterization, and perception-driven shape analysis and modeling".
