= Edward Knightly =

- Education: Auburn University (BS); University of California at Berkeley (MS); University of California at Berkeley (PhD)
- Awards: 2009 IEEE Fellow; 2001 Sloan Fellow; 1997 NSF CAREER Award
- Scientific career
- Doctoral advisor: Domenico Ferrari{}

Edward W. Knightly is an American professor and the department chair of Electrical and Computer Engineering at Rice University in Houston, Texas. He joined the Rice University faculty in 1996. He heads the Rice Networks Group.

== Education ==
Knightly received his PhD and MS from the University of California at Berkeley and his BS from Auburn University, in 1996, 1992 and 1991, respectively. He is the Sheafor-Lindsay Professor of Electrical and Computer Engineering at Rice University.

== Research ==
Knightly's research revolves around networked systems, mobile wireless networks, and security. He focuses on protocol design, performance evaluation and urban-scale testbeds. His research group, the Rice Networks group, was the first to create a multi-user beam-forming WLAN system demonstrating multi-user MIMO in the wireless networking standard IEEE 802.11ac. Current research involves unused Ultra High-Frequency TV spectrum bands to deliver high-speed internet to rural areas, and millimeter wave bands to deliver high-speed WLAN access.

== Technology For All ==
The Rice Networks Group has deployed, operates, and manages a large-scale urban wireless network in a Houston under-resourced community. This network, Technology For All (TFA) Wireless, is serving over 4,000 users in several square kilometers and employs custom-built programmable and observable access points. Knightly sits on the Advisory Board of this organization. In 2011, they installed the first residential deployment of Super Wi-Fi, which uses longer wavelengths to penetrate typical wireless barriers. The network is the first to provide residential access in frequencies spanning from unused UHF TV bands to legacy WiFi bands (500 MHz to 5 GHz).

In 2016, a video of Knightly’s work was featured during the White House’s announcement of a new $400 million Wireless Initiative, intended to maintain United States leadership in the development of wireless technology.

== Awards and honors ==
Knightly is a 2001 Sloan Fellow, a 2009 IEEE Fellow and the recipient of an NSF Career Award. He was elected as an ACM Fellow in 2017. He has chaired several conferences in his field, including the ACM Sigmobile International Symposium on Mobile Ad Hoc Networking and Computing (MobiHoc), the IEEE International Conference on Sensing, Communication and Networking (SECON) and ACM MobiSys: The Annual International Conference on Mobile Systems, Applications and Services. In 2017, he received the award for Research on New Opportunities for Dynamic Spectrum Access by the Dynamic Spectrum Alliance. He serves as an at-large editor for IEEE/ACM Transactions on Networking.
