= Anne-Marie Kermarrec =

French computer scientist (born 1970)

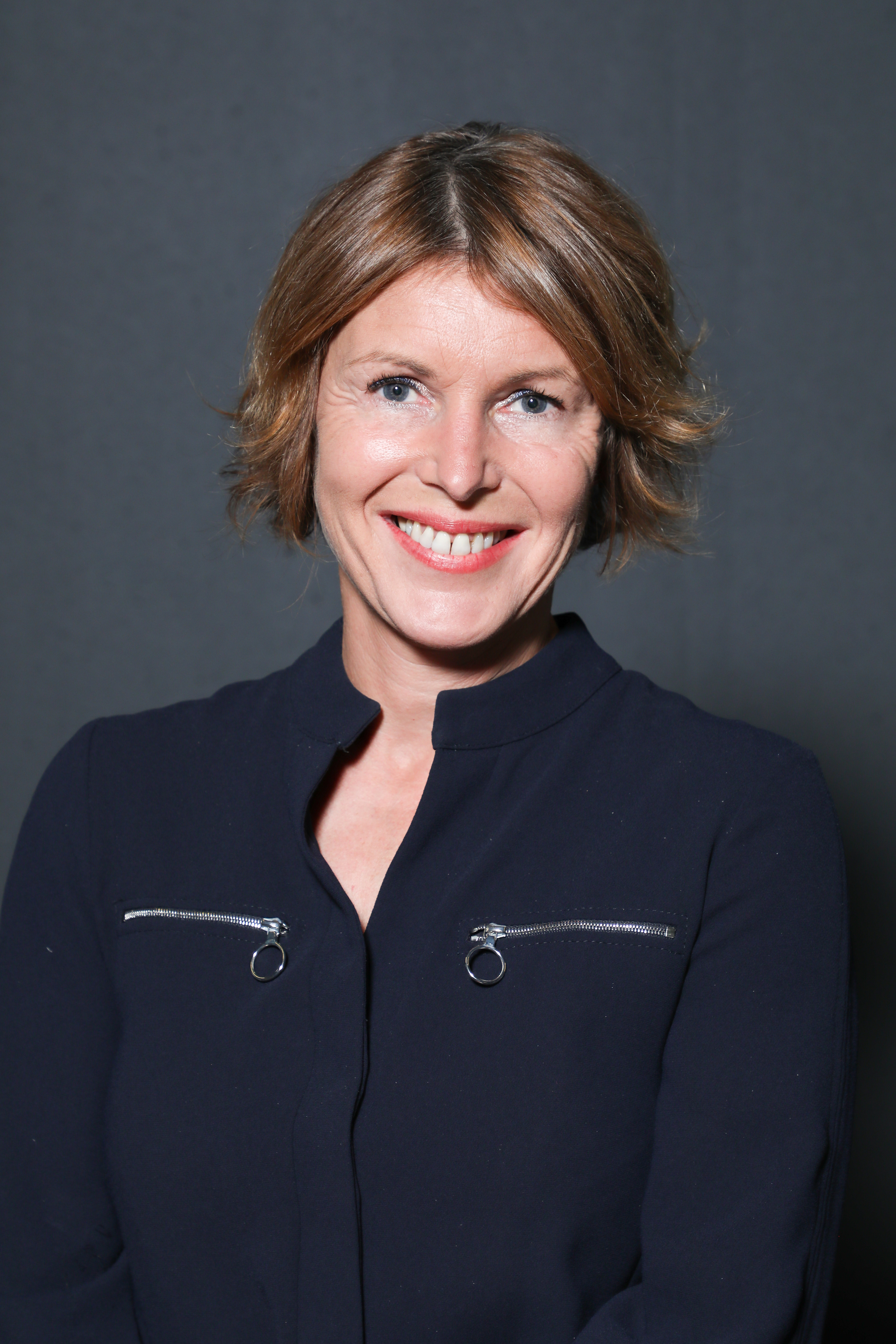
- Anne-Marie Kermarrec in 2020
- Born: 1970 (age 55–56)
- Occupation: Professor
- Awards: Michel-Monpetit Prize, 2011; Member of Academia Europaea, 2013; Inria Awards 2017; ACM Fellow, 2017; Chevalier de la légion d’Honneur of France, 2019

Academic background
- Education: University of Rennes 1
- Thesis: Data replication for high availability and efficiency in large-scale shared memory architectures (1996)
- Doctoral advisor: Michel Banâtre

Academic work
- Discipline: Computer science
- Institutions: EPFL, University of Rennes 1, Microsoft Research (Cambridge, UK), Vrije Universiteit Amsterdam, Inria (Rennes)
- Main interests: Distributed computing, epidemic algorithms, peer-to-peer networks, machine learning
- Website: https://www.epfl.ch/labs/sacs/

Anne-Marie Kermarrec (born 1970) is a French computer scientist. She is a professor at EPFL, Switzerland, where she heads the Scalable Computing Systems Laboratory in the School of Computer and Communication Sciences. Her research concerns distributed computing, epidemic algorithms, peer-to-peer networks, and systematic support for machine learning.

Previously, she was director of research at Inria in Rennes. In 2015, she founded Mediego, a startup company that provides systems for real-time online content personalization.

== Biography ==
Anne-Marie Kermarrec received her PhD in 1996 from the University of Rennes 1. Her thesis was titled “Data replication for high availability and efficiency in large-scale shared memory architectures” and was supervised by Michel Banâtre. She then worked as a postdoctoral researcher at Vrije Universiteit Amsterdam with Andrew S. Tanenbaum until 1997, when she returned to France as a scientist at the University of Rennes 1. From 2000 to 2004, she worked at Microsoft Research, Cambridge, UK, before once again returning to Rennes as a director of research at Inria. In 2012, Kermarrec was appointed as a scientific collaborator at the School of Computer and Communication Sciences, EPFL, co-directing the EPFL-Inria International Lab. In 2019, she was appointed Full Professor at EPFL.

Kermarrec founded a startup, Mediego, in 2015, providing real-time online content personalization systems. The startup won the Inria i-Lab contest in 2015 and was developed in the Ouest France OFF7 incubator with seed funding from the “IT-Translation” project at Inria. In 2019, Mediego was sold to Welcoming Group, a personalized newsletter service.

In 2021, Kermarrec published a book about women in computing, titled Numérique, compter avec les femmes. The book draws upon her personal experiences in academia and entrepreneurship, and in her own words, touches on everything from “the small number of women Nobel laureates” to “biases in AI” to “sex robots", as well as "some outlines of solutions, when I have any, because that isn’t magic either”.

== Recognition ==
Kermarrec won the Michel-Monpetit Prize of the French Academy of Sciences in 2011, and the Dassault Systèmes Innovation Award of the academy and Inria in 2017. In 2019, Kermarrec received the Chevalier de la légion d’Honneur, one of France's highest distinctions.

She was elected to the Academia Europaea in 2013. In 2017, she became a Fellow of the Association for Computing Machinery.
