= Ralf Steinmetz =

German computer scientist and electrical engineer

Ralf Steinmetz (born 31 July 1956 in Santiago de Chile, Chile) is a German computer scientist and electrical engineer. He is professor of multimedia communication at the Technische Universität Darmstadt.

In the eighties Steinmetz coined and sharpened the term multimedia. He did fundamental work in the field of the perception of synchronicity in multimedia flows. At TU Darmstadt Steinmetz is working on realizing truly seamless multimedia communication. His research interests include communication services, IT architectures, knowledge media, mobile networking, networked gaming, network mechanisms & quality of service, peer-to-peer networking, network security & trust and ubiquitous computing.

== Life ==
Steinmetz studied electrical engineering at the Technische Universität Darmstadt (TU Darmstadt), where he received his doctorate in 1986 on the subject of modularized Petri nets for the description and analysis of telecommunication systems with meshed information-processing structures. After further activities in research and management at Philips and IBM from 1987 to 1996, Steinmetz habilitated in 1994 at the department of computer science of the Johann Wolfgang Goethe University on the subject of multimedia technology and their fundamentals, components and systems. In 1996 he was appointed as professor for industrial process and system communication at TU Darmstadt. It was an endowed professorship of the Volkswagen Foundation.

Since 1996, Steinmetz is professor at the department of electrical engineering and information technology and the department of computer science of TU Darmstadt. Since October 2001 he has been head of the Multimedia Communications Lab.

In 1999, he founded the Hessian Telemedia Technology Competence Center (httc e.V.), of which he was chairman of the board until 2022.

Steinmetz has contributed significantly to more than 900 publications and has written several textbooks on multimedia technologies, some of which are standard works in teaching.

== Publications ==
- Steinmetz R., Nahrstedt K. (2004) Multimedia Applications. In: Multimedia Applications. X.media.publishing. Springer, Berlin, Heidelberg
- R. Steinmetz, "Human perception of jitter and media synchronization," in IEEE Journal on Selected Areas in Communications, vol. 14, no. 1, pp. 61-72, Jan. 1996. DOI:10.1109/49.481694
- Norbert A. Streitz, Jörg Geißler, Torsten Holmer, Shin'ichi Konomi, Christian Müller-Tomfelde, Wolfgang Reischl, Petra Rexroth, Peter Seitz, and Ralf Steinmetz. 1999. i-LAND: an interactive landscape for creativity and innovation. In Proceedings of the SIGCHI conference on Human Factors in Computing Systems (CHI '99). ACM, New York, NY, USA, 120-127. DOI:10.1145/302979.303010

== Awards ==
- 1999 appointed IEEE Fellow
- 1999 Award for Excellence in Internet Research from IBM
- 2001 appointment as ACM Fellow
- 2004 National Leadership Award of the Economic Forum Germany
- 2014 Chair of Excellence of the Charles III University of Madrid
- 2018 appointment as GI-Fellow of the Gesellschaft für Informatik
- 2019 elected member of Academia Europaea
- 2022 Honorary Doctor of RWTH Aachen
