= Nitesh Chawla =

Computer scientist

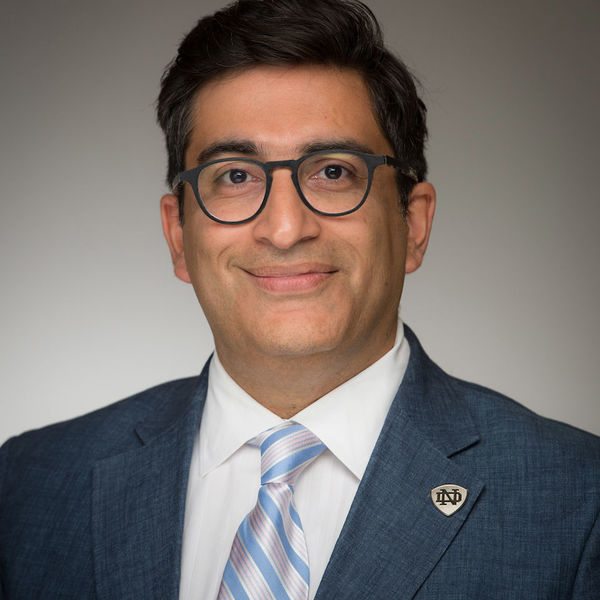
- Other names: Nitesh V. Chawla, N.V. Chawla
- Education: University of South Florida
- Organization: University of Notre Dame
- Notable work: SMOTE: Synthetic Minority Over-sampling TEchnique
- Title: Frank M. Freimann Professor of Computer Science and Engineering and Lucy Family Director for Data & AI Academic Strategy
- Honours: Fellow of AAAI, ACM, IEEE, AAAS
- Website: http://niteshchawla.nd.edu

Nitesh V. Chawla is a computer scientist and data scientist currently serving as the Frank M. Freimann Professor of Computer Science and Engineering at the University of Notre Dame. He is the Founding Director of the Lucy Family Institute for Data & Society. Chawla's research expertise lies in machine learning, data science, and network science. He is also the co-founder of Aunalytics, a data science software and cloud computing company. Chawla is a Fellow of the: American Association for the Advancement of Sciences (AAAS), Association for Computing Machinery (ACM), Association for the Advancement of Artificial Intelligence (AAAI), Asia Pacific Artificial Intelligence Association, and Institute of Electrical and Electronics Engineers (IEEE). He has received multiple awards, including the 1st Source Bank Commercialization Award in 2017, Outstanding Teaching Award (twice), IEEE CIS Early Career Award, National Academy of Engineering New Faculty Award, and the IBM Big Data Award in 2013. One of Chawla's most recognized publications, with a citation count of over 42,000, is the research paper titled "SMOTE: Synthetic Minority Over-sampling Technique." Chawla's research has garnered a citation count of over 91,000 and an H-index of 91.

== Background ==
Nitesh V. Chawla completed his Bachelor of Engineering in Computer Science from the University of Pune, India, in 1997. In 1999, Chawla earned a Master of Science degree in Computer Science and Engineering from the University of South Florida. He went on to complete his Ph.D. in Computer Science and Engineering at the University of South Florida in 2002. He worked at the Canadian Imperial Bank of Commerce as a Senior Risk Modeling Manager from 2002 to 2004. He joined the University of Notre Dame as a Research Assistant Professor in 2005. He began his tenure-track career also at Notre Dame in 2007.

== Academic career ==
=== University of Notre Dame ===
Chawla started as a tenure-track assistant professor in Computer Science and Engineering in 2007. He specializes in data science, network science, artificial intelligence, and machine learning, holding the position of Frank M. Freimann Professor of Computer Science and Engineering since 2015. Chawla is also a concurrent professor of Information Technology Analytics and Operations in the College of Business, as well as Applied and Computational Mathematics and Statistics in the College of Science at University of Notre Dame. He also served as the director of the Center for Network and Data Science from 2011 to 2020. He is also the Founding Director of the Lucy Family Institute for Data and Society. Additionally, he holds Fellowships in multiple institutes at Notre Dame, including the Pulte Institute for Global Development (since 2019), the Kellogg Institute for International Studies (since 2017), the Kroc Institute for Peace Studies (since 2015), the Liu Institute for Asia and Asian Studies (since 2014), and the Reilly Center for Science, Technology and Values (since 2012).

==== Lucy Family Institute of Data & Society ====
The Lucy Family Institute collaborates on advancing data-driven convergence research, translational solutions, and education to ethically address social problems. At the nexus of academia, industry, and the public, the Institute fosters data science access to strengthen diverse and inclusive capacity building within communities. Nitesh Chawla serves as the Founding Director of the Lucy Family Institute for Data & Society.

=== Elected Fellow ===
- Association for Computing Machinery (ACM) Fellow
- Institute of Electrical and Electronics Engineers (IEEE) Fellow
- Asia-Pacific Artificial Intelligence Association (AAIA) Fellow
- Association for the Advancement of Artificial Intelligence Fellow.
- American Association for the Advancement of SciencesFellow

=== Entrepreneurship ===
In 2012, he co-founded Aunalytics Inc., a company specializing in data science software and solutions. Additionally, in 2020, he co-founded Intrepid Phoenix, an organization that utilizes artificial intelligence to offer personalized recovery paths for individuals dealing with substance use.

=== Research and publications ===
Chawla's research has garnered a citation count of over 91,000 and an H-index of 91 . His primary areas of focus include artificial intelligence, machine learning, data and network sciences. He has received several awards and honors for his research and scholarship, including best paper nominations and awards. His students have also received several awards and honors such as the KDD Outstanding Dissertation Runner Up Award, KDD Rising Star Award, IJCAI Early Career spotlight, NSF CAREER Award, etc.

== Honors and Distinctions ==
- American Association for the Advancement of Science Fellow
- Association for the Advancement of Artificial Intelligence (AAAI) Fellow.
- Association for Computing Machinery (ACM) Fellow
- Institute of Electrical and Electronics Engineers (IEEE) Fellow
- Asia-Pacific Artificial Intelligence Association (AAIA) Fellow
- 1st Source Bank Commercialization Award, 2017
- IEEE CIS Outstanding Early Career Award, 2015
- IBM Big Data Award, 2013
- IBM Watson Faculty Award, 2012
- Rodney F. Ganey Community Based Research Award, 2014
- Michiana 40 under 40 Honor, 2013

== Selected works ==
- Chawla, Nitesh V., et al. "SMOTE: synthetic minority over-sampling technique." Journal of artificial intelligence research 16 (2002): 321–357. https://doi.org/10.1613/jair.953
- Fernández, Alberto, et al. "SMOTE for learning from imbalanced data: progress and challenges, marking the 15-year anniversary." Journal of artificial intelligence research 61 (2018): 863–905. https://doi.org/10.1613/jair.1.11192
- Chawla, Nitesh V., Nathalie Japkowicz, and Aleksander Kotcz. "Special issue on learning from imbalanced data sets." ACM SIGKDD explorations newsletter 6.1 (2004): 1–6. https://dl.acm.org/doi/10.1145/1007730.1007733
- Chawla, Nitesh V., et al. "SMOTEBoost: Improving prediction of the minority class in boosting." Knowledge Discovery in Databases: PKDD 2003: 7th European Conference on Principles and Practice of Knowledge Discovery in Databases, Cavtat-Dubrovnik, Croatia, September 22–26, 2003. Proceedings 7. Springer Berlin Heidelberg, 2003. https://doi.org/10.1007/978-3-540-39804-2_12
- Chawla, Nitesh V. "Data mining for imbalanced datasets: An overview." Data mining and knowledge discovery handbook (2010): 875–886. DOI: 10.1007/978-0-387-09823-4_45
- Lichtenwalter, Ryan N., Jake T. Lussier, and Nitesh V. Chawla. "New perspectives and methods in link prediction." Proceedings of the 16th ACM SIGKDD international conference on Knowledge discovery and data mining. 2010. https://doi.org/10.1145/1835804.1835837
- Dong, Y., Chawla, N. V., & Swami, A. (2017, August). metapath2vec: Scalable representation learning for heterogeneous networks. In Proceedings of the 23rd ACM SIGKDD international conference on knowledge discovery and data mining (pp. 135-144).
- Zhang, C., Song, D., Huang, C., Swami, A., & Chawla, N. V. (2019, July). Heterogeneous graph neural network. In Proceedings of the 25th ACM SIGKDD international conference on knowledge discovery & data mining (pp. 793-803).
- Chawla, N. V., & Davis, D. A. (2013). Bringing big data to personalized healthcare: a patient-centered framework. Journal of general internal medicine, 28, 660-665.
- Zhang, C., Song, D., Chen, Y., Feng, X., Lumezanu, C., Cheng, W., ... & Chawla, N. V. (2019, July). A deep neural network for unsupervised anomaly detection and diagnosis in multivariate time series data. In Proceedings of the AAAI conference on artificial intelligence (Vol. 33, No. 01, pp. 1409-1416).
- Yang, Yang, Nitesh V. Chawla, and Brian Uzzi. "A network’s gender composition and communication pattern predict women’s leadership success." Proceedings of the National Academy of Sciences 116.6 (2019): 2033–2038. https://doi.org/10.1073/pnas.1721438116
