= Arvind Krishnamurthy =

Arvind Krishnamurthy is the Short-Dooley Professor at the Paul G. Allen School of Computer Science and Engineering, University of Washington. He is currently serving as the Vice President of USENIX (since 2020), and was named an ACM Fellow in 2020. His primary areas of research are computer networks and distributed systems.

Arvind Krishnamurthy received his bachelor's degree from IIT Madras (1991) and his masters (1994) and doctoral degrees (1999) from University of California, Berkeley.
