= Ranveer Chandra =

Indian American computer scientist

- Born: Jamshedpur, India
- Education: IIT Kharagpur; Cornell University
- Occupation: Computer scientist
- Employer: Microsoft
- Awards: ACM Fellow (2022); America's 50 Most Disruptive Innovators (2021); IEEE Fellow (2020); Innovators Under 35 (2010)

Ranveer Chandra is an Indian American computer scientist who is Vice President of Frontier Tuning at Microsoft and an affiliate professor at the University of Washington. He is known for his contributions to software-defined networking, wireless networks and digital agriculture. Previously, he served as the Chief Scientist at Microsoft Azure Global and currently holds the position of Chief Technology Officer (CTO) of Agri-Food at Microsoft.

== Early life and education ==
Chandra was born and grew up in Jamshedpur, India. He received his B.Tech. in Computer Science and Engineering from the Indian Institute of Technology (IIT), Kharagpur, and later pursued a PhD in Computer Science from Cornell University.

== Work ==
Dr. Chandra began his career at Microsoft Research in Redmond, Washington. One of his notable contributions includes co-inventing wireless hardware virtualization, a technology enabling a Wi-Fi card to connect to multiple wireless networks simultaneously. This innovation, developed in collaboration with Victor Bahl, led to the release of Virtual Wi-Fi by Microsoft in Windows 7 in 2009. This allowed for concurrent network connections, extended Wi-Fi range through relay devices, and localized Wi-Fi hotspots.

Chandra also led the white space networking project at Microsoft Research, presenting his research at the United States Department of Agriculture (USDA) and the Federal Communications Commission (FCC). His work in this domain significantly influenced government regulations, such as the FCC's TV white space regulations.

In 2015, Chandra initiated Project FarmBeats at Microsoft, which later evolved into Azure Data Manager for Agriculture (ADMA). This platform harnesses advanced technologies to enhance farm productivity and reduce costs through data-driven insights. His efforts in digital agriculture have been endorsed by Bill Gates, who featured Chandra's work on FarmBeats on GatesNotes.

Chandra has contributed to various Microsoft products, including Windows, Azure, Visual Studio, and Xbox. He has published over 100 research papers and holds more than 150 patents granted by the United States Patent and Trademark Office (USPTO). Chandra's work has received over 23,000 citations according to Google Scholar.

== Research impact ==
Chandra is recognized as an expert in computer systems, with core expertise in networking, wireless, battery, and Internet of Things (IoT) systems. His work in AgTech has led to the development of Microsoft Azure Data Manager for Agriculture (ADMA), adopted by several agriculture companies, such as Bayer and Land O’Lakes, for leveraging digital technologies. His research has also published foundational papers on Chandra's use of AI and GenAI in Agriculture, leading to practical implementations by industry leaders like Bayer and ITC.

== Professional service contributions ==
Chandra serves on advisory boards for organizations like Cropin and Terramera, utilizing his expertise to enhance agricultural productivity and sustainability. He also contributes to various advisory councils and committees, including the Federal Communications Commission (FCC) Technological Advisory Council (TAC) and the Internet of Things (IoT) Advisory Board at the National Institute of Standards and Technology (NIST). Additionally, he serves as a co-chair for the World Economic Forum's Global Future Council on the Future of Food and Water Security.

Ranveer has frequently contributed to the National Academies, including as the keynote speaker at the 2019 US-UK Scientific Forum on Sustainable Agriculture, serving on the organizing committee for the workshop on Exploring a Dynamic Soil Information System. He is also a member of the National Academies Frontier of Engineering (FOE).

== Recognition ==
Chandra has served on the PhD committees of over 15 students from top universities, including MIT, Stanford University, CMU, UT Austin, UIUC, University of Wisconsin, University of Washington, and ETH.

Ranveer has been a key speaker for NSF and USDA workshops and presented to the Secretary of Agriculture. His work has been covered by The Economist, BBC, and The Globe and Mail.

He is a Fellow of the Association for Computing Machinery (ACM) and a Fellow of the Institute of Electrical and Electronics Engineers (IEEE).

== Awards ==
- ACM Fellow (2022)
- Newsweek’s America's 50 Most Disruptive Innovators (2021)
- IEEE Fellow (2020) for contributions to software-defined wireless networking technologies
- USENIX ATC Award (2015)
- Innovators Under 35 (2010)
- Received the ACM SIGCOMM Award (2009)
