= Scott Kirkpatrick =

Israeli computer scientist

- סקוט קירקפטריק
- Occupations: Computer scientist, professor
- Title: Professor at the School of Engineering and Computer Science at Hebrew University

Scott Kirkpatrick (Hebrew: סקוט קירקפטריק) is a computer scientist, and professor in the School of Engineering and Computer Science at the Hebrew University, Jerusalem. He has over 75,000 citations in the fields of information appliances design, statistical physics, and distributed computing.

He initially worked at IBM's Thomas J. Watson Research Center with Daniel Gelatt and Mario Cecchi researching computer design optimization. They argued for "simulated annealing" via the Metropolis–Hastings algorithm, whereas one can obtain iterative improvement to a fast cooling process by "defining appropriate temperatures and energies". Their research was published in Science and was an inflection point in heuristic algorithms.

== Selected research ==
- Havlin, Shlomo, et al. "Challenges in network science: Applications to infrastructures, climate, social systems and economics." The European Physical Journal Special Topics 214.1 (2012): 273–293.
- Schneider, Johannes, and Scott Kirkpatrick. Stochastic optimization. Springer Science & Business Media, 2007.
- Carmi, Shai, et al. "A model of Internet topology using k-shell decomposition." Proceedings of the National Academy of Sciences 104.27 (2007): 11150–11154.
- Kirkpatrick, Scott, C. Daniel Gelatt, and Mario P. Vecchi. "Optimization by simulated annealing." science 220.4598 (1983): 671–680.
- Kirkpatrick, Scott. "Percolation and conduction." Reviews of modern physics 45.4 (1973): 574.

== See also ==
- List of fellows of the Association for Computing Machinery
