= IEEE Transactions on Computers =

- Discipline: Computer design
- Language: English
- Edited by: Ahmed Louri

Publication details
- Former names: 1952-1954: Transactions of the I.R.E. Professional Group on Electronic Computers, 1955-1962: IRE Transactions on Electronic Computers, 1963-1967: IEEE Transactions on Electronic Computers
- History: 1952–present
- Publisher: IEEE Computer Society
- Frequency: Monthly
- Open access: No
- Impact factor: 3.131 (2019)

Standard abbreviations
- ISO 4: IEEE Trans. Comput.

Indexing
- CODEN: ITCOB4
- ISSN: 0018-9340 (print); 1557-9956 (web)
- LCCN: 75642478
- OCLC no.: 1799331

Links
- Journal homepage; Online access

IEEE Transactions on Computers is a monthly peer-reviewed scientific journal covering all aspects of computer design. It was established in 1952 and is published by the IEEE Computer Society. The editor-in-chief is Prof. Avinash Karanth, Chair of the School of Electrical Engineering and Computer Science (EECS) at Ohio University. According to the Journal Citation Reports, the journal has a 2023 impact factor of 3.6.
