= Justin Zobel =

Australian computer scientist

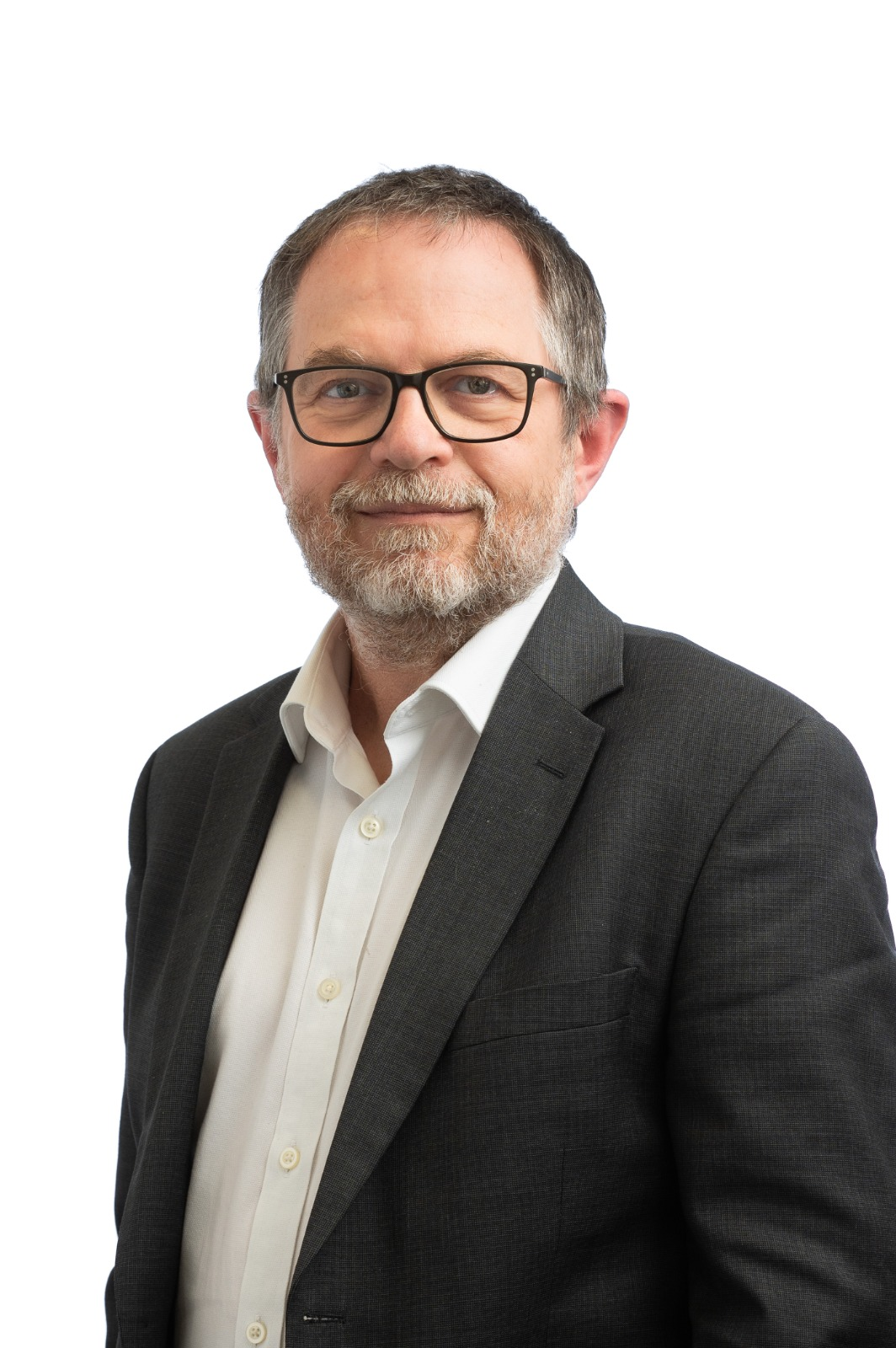
- Born: 1963 (age 62–63); Australia
- Education: University of Melbourne
- Known for: Information retrieval, search engines, data structures, text compression
- Awards: Fellow of the ACM
- Scientific career
- Fields: Computer science
- Workplaces: University of Melbourne
- Thesis: (1991)

Justin Zobel (born 1963) is an Australian computer scientist working in information retrieval, search engine technology, and research evaluation. He is a Redmond Barry Distinguished Professor in the School of Computing and Information Systems at the University of Melbourne and serves as Pro Vice-Chancellor for Graduate & International Research.

== Education and early career ==
Zobel received his Ph.D. in computer science from the University of Melbourne in 1991. His doctoral research was in type theory for logic programming. Following his Ph.D., he held academic appointments at RMIT University, where he was part of the team that developed an open-source search engines, MG. His work at RMIT contributed to the development of scalable methods for indexing and searching large text collections.

== Career ==
Zobel later returned to the University of Melbourne, where he was appointed professor and subsequently Redmond Barry Distinguished Professor. He has served in administrative roles, including Head of the School of Computing and Information Systems and currently as Pro Vice-Chancellor for Graduate & International Research. He has published books, Writing for Computer Science and How to Write a Better Thesis, co-authored with David Evans and Paul Gruba.

== Research ==
Zobel's research has primarily focused on information retrieval, text indexing, search engine architecture, and data compression. He has contributed to the development of efficient, scalable algorithms for managing and searching large-scale textual data. He has collaborated with Alistair Moffat and others on inverted indexes, similarity measures, and compression techniques. He has worked on MG and later Zettair, text retrieval systems designed for high performance on modest hardware. He has also explored self-indexing, dynamic tries, and burst tries as innovative approaches to managing large string datasets.

== Awards and honours ==
Zobel was elected a Fellow of the ACM in 2025 and a Fellow of CORE (the Computing Research and Education Association of Australasia) in the same year. In 2022, he was inducted into the SIGIR Academy. He is also a recipient of the CORE Distinguished Service Award (2016) for his sustained contributions to computing research in Australasia.

== Selected publications ==
- Zobel, J. (2014). Writing for Computer Science (3rd ed.). Springer. ISBN 9781447166397.
- Evans, D., Gruba, P., & Zobel, J. (2011). How to Write a Better Thesis (3rd ed.). Springer. ISBN 978-3-319-04285-5.
- Zobel, J., & Moffat, A. (2006). "Inverted files for text search engines." ACM Computing Surveys, 38(2), Article 6.
- Moffat, A., & Zobel, J. (1996). "Self-indexing inverted files for fast text retrieval." ACM Transactions on Information Systems, 14(4), 349–379.
- Lester, N., Moffat, A., & Zobel, J. (2005). "Fast on-line index construction by geometric partitioning." Proceedings of the 14th ACM International Conference on Information and Knowledge Management, 776–783.
- Webber, W., Moffat, A., & Zobel, J. (2010). "A similarity measure for indefinite rankings." ACM Transactions on Information Systems, 28(4), Article 20.
