= Ramin Zabih =

American computer scientist

Ramin D. Zabih (born November 18, 1963; Alameda County, California) is a professor of Computer Science at Cornell University and Cornell Tech in Ithaca, New York.

== Education and career ==
Zabih got undergraduate degrees from the Massachusetts Institute of Technology in computer science and mathematics and then graduated from Stanford University in 1994 with a Ph.D. in computer science under Oussama Khatib. Zabih became a faculty member at Cornell University in 1994 and in 2013 joined Cornell Tech. He specializes in computer vision and apps, most of which have to do with medicine. His technology is used by many companies including such as AOL, Google and Microsoft. He also was an Editor-in-Chief of IEEE Transactions on Pattern Analysis and Machine Intelligence from 2009 to 2012.

== Recognitions ==
In 2012, Zabih was elected a fellow of the Association for Computing Machinery "for contributions to discrete optimization in computer vision"

He was named Fellow of the Institute of Electrical and Electronics Engineers (IEEE) in 2013 for contributions to computer vision algorithms.
