= T. R. N. Rao =

Indian-born American computer scientist (1933–2024)

- Born: Thammavaram Rudra Narasimha Rao; June 5, 1933; Timmanapalem, Andhra Pradesh, India
- Died: February 14, 2024 (aged 90); Missouri City, Texas, U.S.
- Education: Andhra University; Indian Institute of Science; Tata Institute of Fundamental Research; University of Michigan (M.S., Ph.D.)
- Known for: Rao–Feng theorem; Error-control coding; Coding for arithmetic processors; Computing Science in Ancient India; Aryabhata remainder theorem (applications to public-key cryptography)
- Awards: Fellow, IEEE; Fellow, ACM; Tamma Sambaiah Gold Medal (Andhra University)
- Scientific career
- Fields: Computer science; coding theory; error-control coding
- Workplaces: Bell Telephone Laboratories, Holmdel, NJ; Southern Methodist University; University of Louisiana at Lafayette
- Doctoral students: 25

Thammavaram Rudra Narasimha Rao (June 5, 1933 – February 14, 2024), widely known as T. R. N. Rao, was an Indian-born American computer scientist recognized for foundational contributions to error-control coding, coding theory, and arithmetic processor reliability. A Fellow of both the Institute of Electrical and Electronics Engineers (IEEE) and the Association for Computing Machinery (ACM), Rao was a long-serving faculty member and Professor Emeritus at the University of Louisiana at Lafayette.

Rao's career spanned theoretical computer science, applied coding theory, computational complexity, and historical mathematics. His work includes the Rao–Feng theorem, widely used textbooks, and research connecting ancient Indian computational methods with modern algorithmic systems.

== Early life and education ==
Rao was born on June 5, 1933, in Timmanapalem near Medarametla, Andhra Pradesh, India. He was raised in a traditional Niyogi Brahmin family and demonstrated early mathematical aptitude.

He earned his bachelor's degree from Andhra University, where he received the Tamma Sambaiah Gold Medal for excellence in mathematics.

Rao pursued graduate study at the Indian Institute of Science (IISc), followed by research at the Tata Institute of Fundamental Research (TIFR). In 1959, he received the Mahindra & Mahindra International Scholarship, enabling him to complete his M.S. and Ph.D. at the University of Michigan.

== Academic career ==
After completing his doctorate, Rao joined Bell Labs in Holmdel, New Jersey (later AT&T Bell Laboratories), contributing to early developments in coding theory, computational reliability, and arithmetic processor design.

He later taught at Southern Methodist University (SMU) in Dallas, Texas.

In 1980, Rao joined the University of Louisiana at Lafayette (then the University of Southwestern Louisiana) as part of the Center for Advanced Computer Studies (CACS). He supervised 25 doctoral dissertations and helped strengthen the university's research presence. He retired as Professor Emeritus.

Rao delivered invited lectures internationally, including in Italy and Germany. He enjoyed bridge, tennis, philosophy, and classical Indian literature.

== Research contributions ==
Rao's research spans several areas of coding theory and computation.

=== Error-control coding ===
Rao co-authored influential textbooks, including:

- Error-Control Coding for Computer Systems
- Error Coding for Arithmetic Processors

=== Coding theory and arithmetic ===
- Co-developer of the Rao–Feng theorem
- Contributions to coding for arithmetic processors
- Research into algebraic structures applied to computational complexity

=== Number theory and cryptography ===
Rao explored the computational relevance of classical Indian mathematics:

- Aryabhata Remainder Theorem: Relevance to Public-Key Crypto-Algorithms (Circuits, Systems, and Signal Processing, 2006)

=== History of computation ===
- Computing Science in Ancient India

=== Editorial work ===
- Co-editor, IEEE Computer Society Sixth Symposium on Computer Arithmetic (1983)

== Honors and recognition ==
- Fellow, IEEE
- Fellow, ACM
- Tamma Sambaiah Gold Medal (Andhra University)
- Professor Emeritus, University of Louisiana at Lafayette

== Personal life ==
Rao had three children from his first marriage, all raised in the United States. After relocating to Louisiana in 1980, he remarried and later had a youngest daughter, with whom he shared a close bond.

He died on February 14, 2024, in Missouri City, Texas.

== Selected publications ==
- Error-Control Coding for Computer Systems – ISBN 978-0132839532
- Error Coding for Arithmetic Processors – ISBN 978-0125807500
- Computing Science in Ancient India – ISBN 978-8121509855
- Aryabhata Remainder Theorem: Relevance to Public-Key Crypto-Algorithms (2006)
- IEEE Computer Society Sixth Symposium on Computer Arithmetic – ISBN 978-0818600340
- Rao's Real American Dream: Horoscope to Horizons – ASIN B0C47JD1CN

== See also ==
- Error-correcting code
- Coding theory
- History of Indian mathematics
