= Srini Devadas =

Indian-American computer scientist

- Born: 1963 (age 62–63)
- Occupation: Computer scientist
- Employer: Massachusetts Institute of Technology
- Known for: Physical unclonable functions, secure processors
- Title: Webster Professor of Electrical Engineering and Computer Science
- Spouse: Sulochana Devadas
- Children: Sheela Devadas, Lalita Devadas
- Awards: IEEE W. Wallace McDowell Award (2017); ACM–IEEE CS Eckert–Mauchly Award (2026)

Academic background
- Education: IIT Madras (B.Tech), University of California, Berkeley (MS, Ph.D.)

Srini Devadas is an Indian-American computer scientist at the Massachusetts Institute of Technology's Computer Science and Artificial Intelligence Laboratory (CSAIL) who specializes in computer security, computer architectures, and applied cryptography.

He has worked on topics such as analytical cache modeling, single-chip secure processors, and hardware information flow tracking. He is known for contributions to the development of silicon physical unclonable functions.

Devadas graduated with a B.Tech. in electrical engineering from IIT Madras in 1985. He earned both a master's and a PhD degree in electrical engineering from the University of California at Berkeley advised by A. Richard Newton. He has been a member of MIT's Electrical Engineering and Computer Science department since 1988. He was previously a member of MIT's Research Laboratory of Electronics. He is a Fellow of the Institute of Electrical and Electronics Engineers (IEEE) and the Association for Computing Machinery (ACM).

In 2014 Devadas received the IEEE Edward J. McCluskey Technical Achievement Award for "pioneering work in secure hardware, including the invention of physical unclonable functions and single-chip secure processor architectures." In 2017, he received the IEEE Computer Society's W. Wallace McDowell Award for "fundamental contributions that have shaped the field of secure hardware, impacting circuits, microprocessors, and systems". In 2018, he received the IEEE Circuits and Systems Society Charles A. Desoer Technical Achievement Award for the development of Physical Unclonable Functions and enabling the deployment of secure circuits, processors and systems. In 2021, he received the IEEE Cybersecurity Award for Practice for the development of Physical Unclonable Functions, and the ACM SIGSAC Outstanding Innovation Award for fundamental contributions to secure microprocessors, circuits, and systems.

In 2026, Devadas received the ACM–IEEE CS Eckert–Mauchly Award for "pioneering contributions to secure architectures with broad industrial and academic impact".

In 2016, Devadas won the MIT Everett Moore Baker Teaching Award. In 2016, he was named a MacVicar Faculty Fellow, considered MIT's highest undergraduate teaching award. In 2019, he received a Distinguished Alumnus Award, from IIT Madras, and in 2025 he was named a Distinguished Alumnus of Electrical Engineering by the Electrical Engineering and Computer Sciences Department at the University of California, Berkeley.

He served as the coordinator of the computer science section of the MIT PRIMES program for high school students from 2011 to 2025. He is the father of Sheela Devadas, who won the Alice T. Schafer Prize in 2015. His younger daughter Lalita Devadas is an Assistant Professor of Computer Science at Cooper Union. He is married to Sulochana Devadas, the director of the Math Prize for Girls.
