= John A. Stankovic =

American computer scientist

- Education: Brown University (B.Sc., M.Sc., Ph.D.)
- Scientific career
- Workplaces: University of Virginia
- Thesis: Structured Systems and Their Performance Improvement Through Vertical Migration
- Doctoral advisor: Andries van Dam

John Anthony Stankovic is an American computer scientist. He is currently the BP America Professor Emeritus in the Computer Science Department at the University of Virginia and the director emeritus of the Link Lab at the university's School of Engineering and Applied Science. He retired from the University of Virginia in 2023.

Stankovic received a B.Sc. in electrical engineering from Brown University in 1970. After graduating, he worked at Bell Labs in Whippany, New Jersey. Stankovic returned to Brown for graduate studies, completing an M.Sc. and Ph.D. in 1975 and 1979 under the mentorship of Andries van Dam.

Prior to joining the University of Virginia, Stankovic taught at the University of Massachusetts Amherst.
