= Peter L. Bartlett =

Australian statistician and machine learning researcher (born 1966)

- Born: Peter Leslie Bartlett; 1966 (age 59–60); Australia
- Education: University of Queensland (PhD, 1992)
- Known for: Theoretical foundations of machine learning; Statistical learning theory; Theory of neural networks and deep learning
- Awards: Malcolm McIntosh Prize for Physical Scientist of the Year; Institute of Mathematical Statistics Medallion Lecturer; IMS Fellow; Australian Laureate Fellow; Fellow of the Australian Academy of Science; ACM Fellow; Member of the National Academy of Sciences
- Scientific career
- Fields: Machine learning; Statistical learning theory; Statistics; Computer science
- Workplaces: University of California, Berkeley; Google DeepMind; Google Research Australia; Queensland University of Technology; Australian National University
- Thesis: Computational learning theory and neural network learning (1992)
- Doctoral advisor: Thomas Luther Downs, Jr.

Peter Leslie Bartlett (born 1966) is an Australian statistician, mathematician and computer scientist. He is Professor of the Graduate School in the Departments of Electrical Engineering and Computer Sciences and Statistics at the University of California, Berkeley, Principal Scientist at Google DeepMind, and previously served as Head of Google Research Australia (2022–2023).

His research focuses on the theoretical foundations of machine learning and statistical learning theory, including generalisation bounds, neural network learning, optimisation methods, sequential decision-making problems, and the theory of deep learning (including phenomena such as benign overfitting). He is co-author (with Martin Anthony) of the book Neural Network Learning: Theoretical Foundations (Cambridge University Press, 1999).

== Education ==
Bartlett received his PhD in 1992 from the University of Queensland (School of Computer Science and Electrical Engineering). His doctoral thesis was titled Computational learning theory and neural network learning, supervised by Thomas Luther Downs, Jr.

== Career ==
From 1993 to 2003 he held positions as fellow, senior fellow and professor in the Research School of Information Sciences and Engineering at the Australian National University’s Institute for Advanced Studies. He has also been an honorary professor at the University of Queensland and a visiting professor at the University of Paris.

Bartlett joined the University of California, Berkeley in 2003. He has served as Associate Director of the Simons Institute for the Theory of Computing (2017–2022) and is currently Machine Learning Research Director at the Simons Institute, Director of the Foundations of Data Science Institute, and Director of the Collaboration on the Theoretical Foundations of Deep Learning (both since 2020).

From 2011 to 2017 he was Professor in Mathematical Sciences and an Australian Research Council Australian Laureate Fellow at the Queensland University of Technology. In 2022–2023 he was Head of Google Research Australia while continuing as Principal Scientist at Google DeepMind. He is President of the Association for Computational Learning and an Honorary Professor of Mathematical Sciences at the Australian National University.

He has served as associate editor for the Journal of the ACM, Bernoulli, Mathematics of Operations Research, the Journal of Artificial Intelligence Research, the Journal of Machine Learning Research, the IEEE Transactions on Information Theory, Machine Learning, and Mathematics of Control, Signals, and Systems, and as program committee co-chair for COLT and NeurIPS.

== Awards and honours ==
- Malcolm McIntosh Prize for Physical Scientist of the Year (Australia, 2001)
- Institute of Mathematical Statistics Medallion Lecturer (2008)
- IMS Fellow (2011)
- Australian Laureate Fellow (2011)
- Fellow of the Australian Academy of Science (FAA, 2015)
- ACM Fellow (2018), “for contributions to the theory of machine learning”
- Chancellor’s Distinguished Service Award, University of California, Berkeley (2023)
- Elected to the United States National Academy of Sciences (2026)
- Plenary speaker at the International Congress of Mathematicians (2026)

== Selected publications ==
- Martin Anthony and Peter L. Bartlett, Neural Network Learning: Theoretical Foundations, Cambridge University Press, 1999.
- Papers on statistical learning theory, generalisation, neural networks, online learning, and deep learning theory.
