= David James Wetherall =

American electrical engineer

David James Wetherall from the University of Washington, Seattle, WA was named Fellow of the Institute of Electrical and Electronics Engineers (IEEE) in 2013 for contributions to the design of flexible, robust, and secure networks.
