= Paul Larson (computer scientist) =

American computer scientist

Paul Larson (Per-Åke Larson) is a computer scientist. He is most famous for inventing the linear hashing algorithm with Witold Litwin. Paul Larson is currently a senior researcher in the Database Group of Microsoft Research. He is frequent chair and committee member of conferences such as VLDB, SIGMOD, and the IEEE International Conference on Data Engineering. In 2005 he was inducted as a Fellow of the Association for Computing Machinery.
