= Michael T. Goodrich =

American computer scientist

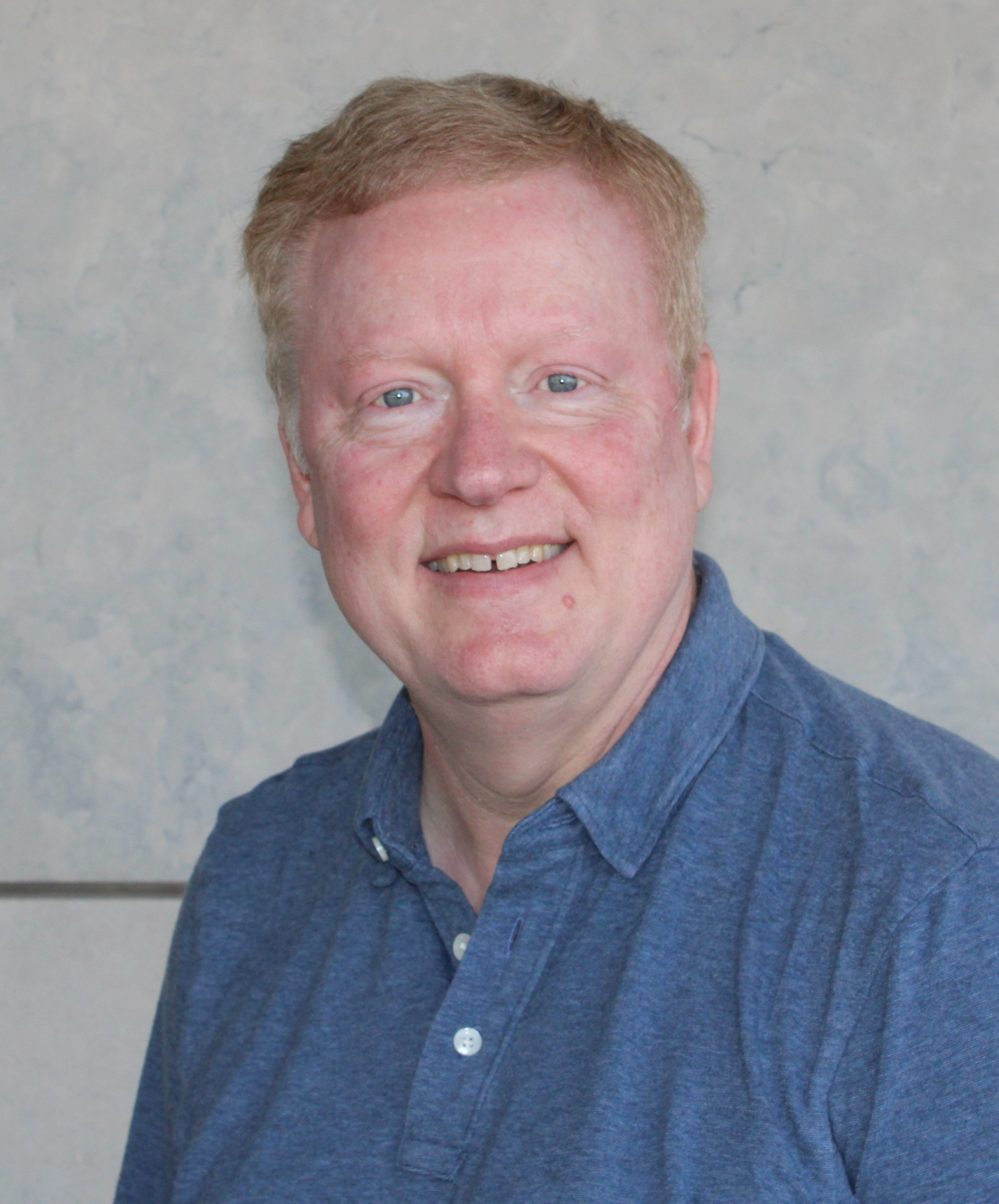
- Goodrich in 2025
- Scientific career
- Fields: Computer Science
- Institutions: University of California, Irvine
- Website: ics.uci.edu/~goodrich/

Michael Truman Goodrich is a mathematician and computer scientist. He is a distinguished professor of computer science and the former chair of the department of computer science in the Donald Bren School of Information and Computer Sciences at the University of California, Irvine.

== University career ==
He received his B.A. in Mathematics and Computer Science from Calvin College in 1983 and his Ph.D. in Computer Sciences from Purdue University in 1987 under the supervision of Mikhail Atallah. He then served as a professor in the Department of Computer Science at Johns Hopkins University until 2001 and has since been a Chancellor's Professor at the University of California, Irvine in the Donald Bren School of Information and Computer Sciences.

== Awards and honors ==
Goodrich is a Fellow of the American Association for the Advancement of Science, a Fulbright Scholar, a Fellow of the IEEE, and a Fellow of the Association for Computing Machinery. In 2018 he was elected as a foreign member of the Royal Danish Academy of Sciences and Letters.

He is also a recipient of the IEEE Computer Society Technical Achievement Award in 2006, the DARPA Spirit of Technology Transfer Award, and the ACM Recognition of Service Award.
