= Wenliang Du =

Chinese-American electrical engineer

- Citizenship: China
- Occupations: academic, researcher
- Employer: Syracuse University
- Awards: Fellow of the Institute of Electrical and Electronics Engineers (IEEE)

Wenliang "Kevin" Du is a professor in Electrical Engineering and Computer Science at Syracuse University. He was named a Fellow of the Institute of Electrical and Electronics Engineers (IEEE) in 2023 for his contributions to cybersecurity education and research. He was named as an ACM Fellow in 2024 with the same citation.
