= Sven Apel =

German computer scientist

Prof. Dr. Sven Apel
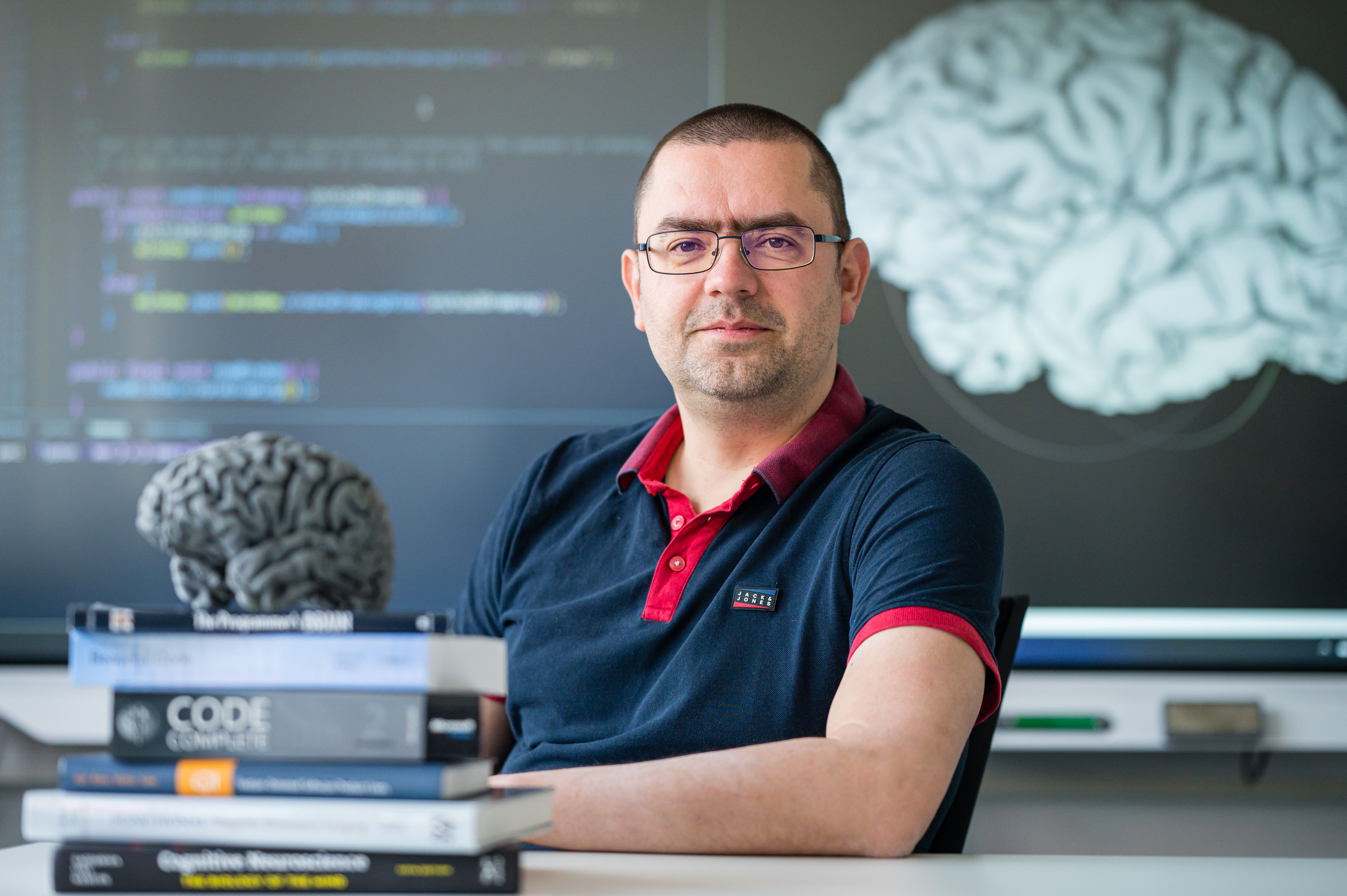
- Prof. Dr. Sven Apel
- Born: 1977
- Position: Professor of Computer Science
- Institution: Saarland University
- Website: https://www.se.cs.uni-saarland.de/apel/

Sven Apel (born 1977 in Osterburg (Altmark)) is a German computer scientist and Professor of Software Engineering at Saarland University.

His research focuses on the development of methods, tools and theories for the construction and analysis of reliable, efficient, and maintainable software with a particular focus on the human factor, the role of AI, and on interdisciplinary research questions.

== Career ==
Sven Apel studied Computer Science at the University of Magdeburg from 1996 to 2002. He completed his doctorate in Computer Science there from 2003 to 2007. His dissertation, which was graded summa cum laude, received several prestigious awards (see Awards).

After completing his doctorate, Apel was a research assistant (post-doc) at the University of Passau until 2010. From 2010 to 2013, he headed the Emmy Noether Research Group “Safe and Efficient Software Product Lines” there, before being appointed professor in 2013 as part of DFG's Heisenberg Programme.

Since 2019, Sven Apel has been a Full Professor (W3) of Computer Science with a focus on Software Engineering at Saarland University. Since 2022, he has been leading the European Research Council-funded project “Brains on Code” (ERC Advanced Grant), in which he uses neurophysiological methods to investigate the foundations of program comprehension. Sven Apel was named an ACM Fellow in 2025, and he was elected to the inaugural class of the ACM SIGSOFT Software Engineering Academy in 2026. Since 2026 he is Adjunct Faculty at Max Planck Institute for Software Systems.

== Main areas of research ==
Sven Apel's research focuses on methods, tools and theories for the construction and analysis of reliable, efficient, and maintainable software. He pays particular attention to the human factor and the role of AI in programming and software development. He primarily conducts basic research with a strong emphasis on interdisciplinary research questions. Apel combines formal, empirical, and engineering methods in novel ways and is a leader in the development and promotion of rigorous empirical methodology in software research. He collaborates closely with scientists from various other disciplines, in particular, Psychology, Neuroscience, and Economics.

In 2013, Sven Apel and colleagues conducted the world's first study using functional magnetic resonance imaging (fMRI) to measure program comprehension, pioneering work in the field. This and a series of follow-up studies have identified key regions of the brain involved in program comprehension. In 2022, his ongoing work on the neuroscientific basis of program comprehension was awarded an ERC Advanced Grant. He has been successfully leveraging AI techniques for software engineering problems for more than a decade, and he has been the first to study the neurophysiological and mechanistic alignment between human programmers and large language models.

Apel is one of the developers of the paradigm of feature-oriented software development. He laid the conceptual and technological foundations for this, with a particular focus on programming language-independent abstractions, theory building, and tool support. Apel and colleagues introduced the concept of variability-aware program analysis, which extends existing basic analysis techniques such as model checking, type checking, and static program analysis to take software variability into account. He was also one of the first to use machine learning for modeling large configuration spaces of real-world software systems. His textbook on feature-oriented software product lines has become an international standard text for research and teaching in this field.

== Awards (selection) ==
- 2025: ACM Fellow
- 2022: ERC Advanced Grant
- 2022: ASE Fellow
- 2018: ACM Distinguished Member
- 2016: Hugo Junkers Award for Research and Innovation
- 2015: Appointment to the Young Academy of Europe
- 2013: Heisenberg Professorship of the German Research Foundation
- 2010: Emmy Noether Fellowship of the German Research Foundation
- 2007: Dissertation Award of the University of Magdeburg and the Karin Witte Foundation
- 2007: Software Engineering Award of the Ernst Denert Foundation for the Best Doctoral Dissertation
- 2006: Award of the School of Computer Science, University of Magdeburg for Outstanding Scientific Achievements
- Most Influential Paper Awards: SPLC'19, ICPC'22, GPCE'23
- ACM SIGSOFT Distinguished Paper Awards: ICSE'15, ICSE'21
- Best Paper Awards: SPLC'11, Modularity'15, Academy of Management'18
- Distinguished Reviewer Awards: ASE'18, ICSE'24, FSE'24
