= Chenyang Lu =

Chenyang Lu is an engineer and the Fullgraf Professor at Washington University in St. Louis, as well as the editor-in-chief of ACM Transactions on Sensor Networks.

Lu was named a Fellow of the Institute of Electrical and Electronics Engineers (IEEE) in 2016 for his contributions to adaptive real-time computing systems. Lu earned his BS from the University of Science and Technology of China, his MS from the Chinese Academy of Sciences, and his PhD from the University of Virginia.
