= Lance Hoffman =

Lance J. Hoffman is emeritus professor of computer science at The George Washington University (GW) in Washington, DC. He initiated and taught the first course on computer security in a regular accredited degree program in the United States at the University of California, Berkeley, in 1970 and established the computer security program there and at GW and led GW's to national recognition as a Center of Academic Excellence in Information Assurance Education.

He is the author or editor of numerous articles and five books on computer security and privacy. His teaching innovations also include multidisciplinary courses on electronic commerce and network security and the development of a portable educational network for teaching computer security. He also directed the National Science Foundation computer security scholarship programs ("CyberCorps") at GW.

A Fellow of the Association for Computing Machinery, Hoffman has served on a number of advisory committees, including those of the Center for Democracy and Technology, the Federal Trade Commission, and the ACM Conference on Computers, Freedom, and Privacy, and has occasionally testified before Congress on security and privacy-related issues.

Hoffman was co-editor of a special section of Communications of the Association for Computing Machinery on electronic voting in 2000 and wrote one of the early reports on issues with electronic voting in 1987, funded by a grant from the Markle Foundation. His later research interests included encryption policy, cybersecurity exercises for college students, e-commerce security, and cybersecurity education and workforce development . He also developed a personal computer-based risk analysis system, RISKCALC, that was a commercial product for a short time . From 2006-2008, he served as an elected Council Member of the town of Chevy Chase, Maryland.

In 2016, Hoffman was installed in the National Cyber Security Hall of Fame.

Hoffman received his B.S. in mathematics from Carnegie Mellon University and his M.S. and Ph.D. from Stanford University in computer science.

== Books he has authored ==
1. Building in Big Brother: The Encryption Policy Debate (Editor), Springer-Verlag, New York, N. Y., 1995. ISBN 978-0-387-94441-8
2. Proceedings of the Second Conference on Computers, Freedom, and Privacy (Editor), Association for Computing Machinery Conferences Office, New York, N. Y., 1993.
3. Rogue Programs: Viruses, Worms, and Trojan Horses (Editor), Van Nostrand Reinhold, New York, N. Y., 1990.
4. Computers and Privacy in the Next Decade (Editor), Academic Press, New York, N. Y., 1980.
5. Modern Methods for Computer Privacy and Security, Prentice Hall, Inc., Englewood Cliffs, N. J., 1977.
6. Security and Privacy in Computer Systems (Editor), Melville Publishing Co., Los Angeles, California, 1973.

== Selected publications ==
1. Kim Lawson-Jenkins, Lance J. Hoffman, How to Migrate to Internet Voting, January 20, 2007.
2. Lance J. Hoffman, Making Every Vote Count: Security and Reliability of Computerized Vote-Counting Systems , (original Markle Foundation report), December 1987.
3. Lance J. Hoffman, Kim Lawson-Jenkins, and Jeremy Blum, Trust beyond security: an expanded trust model, Communications of the ACM, Vol. 49, No. 7, pp. 94–101, July 2006, .
4. Timothy Rosenberg and Lance J. Hoffman, "Taking Networks on the Road: Portable Solutions for Security Educators", IEEE Security & Privacy, Vol. 4, No. 1, pp. 57–60, January–February 2006, .
5. Lance Hoffman, Cynthia Cicalese, Janine DeWitt, and Timothy Rosenberg, “An Integrated Approach to Computer Security Instruction Using Case Study Modules and a Portable Network Laboratory”, Proc. 4th World Information Security Education Conference, Moscow, May 2005.
6. Lance J. Hoffman, Tim Rosenberg, Ronald Dodge, and Daniel Ragsdale, "Exploring a National Cybersecurity Exercise for Universities", IEEE Security & Privacy, Vol. 3, No. 5, pp. 27–33, September–October 2005, .
7. Paul C. Clark and Lance J. Hoffman, BITS: a smartcard protected operating system, Communications of the ACM, Vol. 37, No. 11, pp. 66–70, November 1994, .
8. Lance J. Hoffman, Faraz A. Ali, Steven L. Heckler, and Ann Huybrechts, Cryptography policy, Communications of the ACM, Vol. 37, Issue 9, pp. 109–117, September 1994, .
9. Rachna Dhamija, Rachelle Heller, Lance J. Hoffman, Teaching e-commerce to a multidisciplinary class, Communications of the ACM, Vol. 42, Issue 9, pp. 50–55, September 1999, .
10. Lance J. Hoffman, Computers and Privacy: A Survey, ACM Computing Surveys, Vol. 1, Issue 2, pp. 85–103, June 1969, .
