= ACM Fellow =

ACM Fellowship
- Date: 1993
- Location: New York City
- Website: awards.acm.org/fellow

ACM Fellowship is an award and fellowship that recognises outstanding members of the Association for Computing Machinery (ACM). The title of ACM Fellow indicates excellence, as evinced by technical, professional and leadership contributions that advance computingpromote the free exchange of ideas, and advance the objectives of the Association for Computing Machinery.

New fellows have been elected annually since 1993. At most, one percent of the Association for Computing Machinery membership may be elected as fellows.

== See also ==
- List of fellows of the Association for Computing Machinery
- Fellows of the ACM (category)
