= IEEE Computer Society Charles Babbage Award =

Annual award in parallel and distributed processing

Charles Babbage Award
- Description: Annual award recognizing exceptional contributions to parallel and distributed computing
- Presented by: IEEE Computer Society (formerly IPDPS)

In 1989, the International Parallel and Distributed Processing Symposium established the Charles Babbage Award to be given each year to a conference participant in recognition of exceptional contributions to the field. In almost all cases, the award is given to one of the invited keynote speakers at the conference. The selection was made by the steering committee chairs, upon recommendation from the Program Chair and General Chair who have been responsible for the technical program of the conference, including inviting the speakers. It is presented immediately following the selected speaker's presentation at the conference, and he or she is given a plaque that specifies the nature of their special contribution to the field that is being recognized by IPDPS.

== Recipients ==
In 2019, the management of the IEEE CS Babbage Award was transferred to the IEEE Computer Society's Awards Committee.

Past recipients:

- 1989 - Irving S. Reed
- 1990 - H.T. Kung
- 1991 - Harold S. Stone
- 1992 - David Kuck
- 1993 - K. Mani Chandy
- 1994 - Arvind
- 1995 - Richard Karp
- 1997 - Frances E. Allen
- 1998 - Jim Gray
- 1999 - K. Mani Chandy
- 2000 - Michael O. Rabin
- 2001 - Thomson Leighton
- 2002 - Steve Wallach
- 2003 - Michel Cosnard
- 2004 - Christos Papadimitriou
- 2005 - Yale N. Patt
- 2006 - Bill Dally
- 2007 - Mike Flynn
- 2008 - Joel Saltz
- 2009 - Wen-Mei Hwu
- 2010 - Burton Smith
- 2011 - Jack Dongarra
- 2012 - Chris Johnson
- 2013 - James Demmel
- 2014 - Peter Kogge
- 2015 - Alan Edelman
- 2017 - Mateo Valero. "For contributions to parallel computation through brilliant technical work, mentoring PhD students, and building an incredibly productive European research environment."
- 2019 - Ian Foster. "For his outstanding contributions in the areas of parallel computing languages, algorithms, and technologies for scalable distributed applications."
- 2020 - Yves Robert. "For contributions to parallel algorithms and scheduling techniques."
- 2021 - Guy Blelloch. "For contributions to parallel programming, parallel algorithms, and the interface between them."
- 2022 - Dhabaleswar K. (DK) Panda. "For contributions to high performance and scalable communication in parallel and high-end computing systems."
- 2023 - Keshav K Pingali. "For contributions to programmability of high-performance parallel computing on irregular algorithms and graph algorithms."
- 2024 - Franck Cappello. "For pioneering contributions and inspiring leadership in distributed computing, high-performance computing, resilience, and data reduction."
- 2025 - Srinivas Aluru. "For pioneering contributions to the field of Parallel Computational Biology."
- 2026 - Uzi Vishkin. "For seminal contributions to the theory of PRAM computing, and for inventing numerous work-efficient parallel algorithms."

== See also ==
- List of computer science awards
- List of awards named after people
