= Georgia Institute of Technology School of Computational Science & Engineering =

School of computer science in Atlanta, Georgia

- Type: Public
- Established: 2010; 16 years ago
- Parent institution: Georgia Institute of Technology
- Chair: Haesun Park
- Academic staff: 47
- Postgraduates: 148
- Doctoral students: 115
- Location: Atlanta, Georgia, United States; 33.777524°N 84.3961°W
- Website: cse.gatech.edu

The School of Computational Science & Engineering is an academic unit located within the College of Computing at the Georgia Institute of Technology (Georgia Tech). It conducts both research and teaching activities related to computational science and engineering at the undergraduate and graduate levels. These activities focus on "making fundamental advances in the creation and application of new computational methods and techniques in order to enable breakthroughs in scientific discovery and engineering practice."

== History ==
In 2004, Dean Richard DeMillo of Georgia Tech's College of Computing (CoC) thought of the creation of a new academic division focused on computational science and engineering (CSE) as a distinct and interdisciplinary discipline. Discussions with potential faculty, including David Bader, led to his recruitment in 2005 as the division's first faculty member. Alongside Georgia Tech faculty member Richard Fujimoto and Haesun Park, who joined later that year, Bader helped establish the CSE division.

In 2006, through the CSE division, Georgia Tech was designated as the first Sony-Toshiba-IBM Center of Competence in 2006. The division developed its initial graduate curriculum with an emphasis on interdisciplinary collaboration. CSE secured research grants from major technology companies, including Microsoft Research and IBM.

By 2007, the division evolved into the School of Computational Science and Engineering. It was elevated to "school" status in March 2010, and Richard Fujimoto was appointed as the school's founding chair. The creation of the school represented a continuation of the College of Computing’s efforts to define and delineate the field of computing into focused bodies of study, emphasizing computational science and engineering as an academic discipline as well as highlighting the interdisciplinary nature of the field. Under Fujimoto's leadership as founding chair, the school quickly grew to 13 tenure-track faculty and $8.8 million in research expenditures by 2013. In July 2014, David Bader became the second chair of the department, and Fujimoto returned to the faculty as Chair Emeritus. During Bader's tenure as chair, the school's graduate student enrollment more than doubled, and annual research expenditures increased from $4.3 million to $7.5 million. Bader also launched a strategic partnership program to allow companies to work directly with CSE faculty and graduate students. In 2019, he announced that he would not seek another term as chair and would return to the faculty and research. Haesun Park, who had previously served as the school's associate chair, was named chair in August 2020.

== Degrees offered ==
The School of Computational Science & Engineering offers bachelor's degrees, master's degrees, and doctoral degrees in several fields. These degrees are technically granted by the School's parent organization, the Georgia Tech College of Computing, and often awarded in conjunction with other academic units within Georgia Tech.

Doctoral degrees

- Doctor of Philosophy (Ph.D.) in Computational Science & Engineering
- Doctor of Philosophy (Ph.D.) in Bioengineering
- Doctor of Philosophy (Ph.D.) in Bioinformatics
- Doctor of Philosophy (Ph.D.) in Computer Science
- Doctor of Philosophy (Ph.D.) in Machine Learning

Master's degrees

- Master of Science (M.S.) in Computational Science & Engineering
- Master of Science (M.S.) in Analytics
- Master of Science (M.S.) in Bioengineering
- Master of Science (M.S.) in Computer Science

Bachelor's degrees

- Bachelor of Science (B.S.) in Computer Science

== Research ==
The faculty and students of the school lead and conduct a variety of research in areas including High-performance computing, data science, visual analytics, scientific computing and simulation, computational bioscience and biomedicine, artificial intelligence, and machine learning. As of the 2020 fiscal year, the school had $24.9 million in active funding for research and 74 active research projects. The school has identified several growing research areas, including scientific artificial intelligence, application-driven post-Moore’s law computing, data science for fighting disease, and urban computing, as presenting particular strategic opportunities for its researchers in upcoming years.

== Notable faculty ==
- Srinivas Aluru
- Mark Borodovsky
- Ümit Çatalyürek
- Edmond Chow
- Richard M. Fujimoto
- Haesun Park
- Richard Vuduc

== Location ==
The School of Computational Science & Engineering’s administrative offices, as well as those of most of its faculty and graduate students, are located in the CODA Building.

== See also ==
- Georgia Institute of Technology College of Computing
