= David Bader (computer scientist) =

American computer scientist

David A. Bader
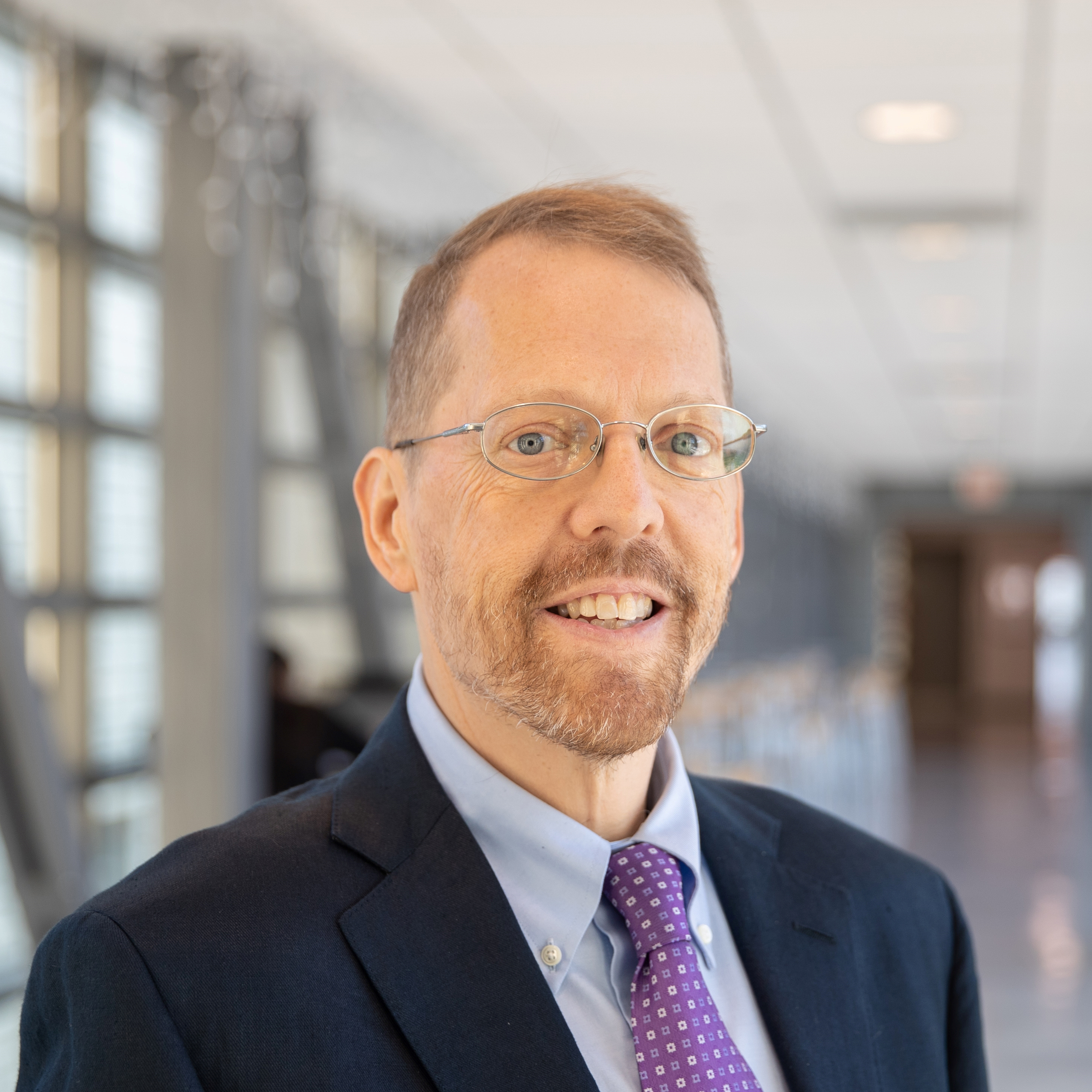
- Bader in May 2022
- Born: May 4, 1969 (age 57); Bethlehem, Pennsylvania, U.S.
- Education: Lehigh University (B.S. and M.S.); University of Maryland, College Park (Ph.D.)
- Known for: Inventing commodity supercomputing Scalable Graph Algorithms; Founding the School of Computational Science and Engineering at Georgia Tech; Founding director, Institute for Data Science at NJIT
- Awards: AAAS Fellow; IEEE Fellow; SIAM Fellow; IEEE Computer Society Sidney Fernbach Award; ACM Fellow; Mimms Museum of Technology and Art Hall of Fame Inductee
- Scientific career
- Fields: High-Performance Computing
- Workplaces: New Jersey Institute of Technology; Georgia Institute of Technology; University of New Mexico
- Thesis: On the design and analysis of practical parallel algorithms for combinatorial problems with applications to image processing (1996)
- Doctoral advisor: Joseph F. JaJa
- Website: davidbader.net

David A. Bader (born May 4, 1969) is a Distinguished Professor, co-Founder of the start-up company Adapter, and Director of the Institute for Data Science at the New Jersey Institute of Technology. Previously, he served as the Chair of the Georgia Institute of Technology School of Computational Science & Engineering, where he was also a founding professor, and the executive director of High-Performance Computing at the Georgia Tech College of Computing. In 2007, he was named the first director of the Sony Toshiba IBM Center of Competence for the Cell Processor at Georgia Tech.

Bader serves on the Computing Research Association's board of directors, the National Science Foundation's advisory committee on cyberinfrastructure, and has served on the IEEE Computer Society's board of governors. He is an expert in the design and analysis of parallel and multicore algorithms for real-world applications such as those in cybersecurity and computational biology. His main areas of research are at the intersection of high-performance computing and real-world applications, including cybersecurity, massive-scale analytics, and computational genomics. Bader built the first Linux supercomputer using commodity processors and a high-speed interconnection network.

Bader is an IEEE Fellow, an AAAS Fellow, SIAM Fellow, and an ACM Fellow. He has won awards from IBM, Microsoft Research, Nvidia, Facebook, Intel, Accenture, and Sony. He has served on numerous conference program committees related to parallel processing and has edited numerous journals. In 2018, Bader was recognized as one of the most impactful authors in the history of the IEEE International Conference on High-Performance Computing, Data, and Analytics (HiPC). In 2026 he received the New Jersey Institute of Technology's Excellence in Research Prize and Medal.

== Early life and education ==
Bader was born on May 4, 1969, in Bethlehem, Pennsylvania, the son of chemistry professor Morris Bader and his wife Karen. He is an Eagle Scout in the Boy Scouts of America, earning the rank in 1985. Bader graduated from Liberty High School in Bethlehem, Pennsylvania in 1987.

He received a B.S. in computer engineering in 1990 and an M.S. in electrical engineering in 1991 from Lehigh University in Bethlehem. He then received a Ph.D. in electrical engineering in 1996 from the University of Maryland, College Park. While at UMD in 1992, Bader was awarded a NASA Graduate Student Researchers Fellowship by Gerald Soffen, project scientist for the Viking missions to Mars at Goddard Space Flight Center.

== Career ==
Bader was hired as an assistant professor and Regents' Lecturer in the electrical and computer engineering department at the University of New Mexico (UNM) in 1998. In 2003, he was elected chair of the IEEE Computer Society's technical committee on parallel processing.

In 2004, Bader contributed to discussions with Dean Richard DeMillo that led to the development of Georgia Tech's Computational Science and Engineering (CSE) initiative. He remained at UNM until 2005, when he became the first faculty hire for Georgia Tech's CSE initiative. At Georgia Tech, his work emphasized hands-on experience and interdisciplinary research.

Shortly after joining Georgia Tech, Bader collaborated with other faculty members to establish a School of Computational Science and Engineering at Georgia Tech. Two years later, in 2007, these efforts resulted in the school's establishment as an official academic unit, and Bader became a full professor in 2008 as one of the school's founding faculty. Richard M. Fujimoto was named the school's first chair, and Bader was later named the second chair of the school of CSE in July 2014. He served in that role until his term expired in June 2019.

Bader was involved in a number of research partnerships between Georgia Tech and the public and private sectors. In November 2006, Sony, Toshiba, and IBM selected Bader to direct the first Center of Competence for the Cell Processor. In 2010, Bader was a lead investigator on the Nvidia Echelon project, a $25 million DARPA Award through the Ubiquitous High Performance Computing (UHPC) program. The four-year research collaboration with Nvidia covered work to develop new GPU technologies required to build the new class of exascale supercomputers. Bader and his lab partnered with Nvidia again in April 2019 to develop data analytics solutions for their GPUs.

In 2011, Bader began working with the Georgia Tech Research Institute on the Proactive Discovery of Insider Threats Using Graph Analysis and Learning (PRODIGAL) project. On July 29, 2015, President Barack Obama announced the National Strategic Computing Initiative (NSCI). Bader was invited by the White House on October 20–21, 2015, to serve as a panelist at the White House's National Strategic Computing Initiative (NSCI) Workshop. Following this, the White House's Office of Science and Technology Policy (OSTP) invited Bader to serve as a panelist at the NITRD High End Computing (HEC) Interagency Working Group (IWG) and Big Data Senior Steering Group (SSG) "Supercomputing and Big Data: From Collision to Convergence" Panel, at the 27th IEEE and ACM Supercomputing Conference (SC15) in Austin, Texas, on November 18, 2015. On July 29, 2016, Bader was an invited attendee to the White House's National Strategic Computing Initiative (NSCI) Anniversary Workshop. Bader also co-founded the Graph500 List in 2015 for benchmarking "Big Data" computing platforms.

Bader was elected as an IEEE Fellow in 2009. He served as the Editor-in-Chief of the IEEE Transactions on Parallel and Distributed Systems (TPDS), from 2013 to 2017 and later served as an Associate Editor-in-Chief of the Journal of Parallel and Distributed Computing (JPDC). Bader has been an associate editor of IEEE Transactions on Parallel and Distributed Systems, IEEE DSOnline, Parallel Computing, and the ACM Journal of Experimental Algorithmics, and has published over 400 articles in peer reviewed journals and conferences. He subsequently served as Editor-in-Chief of ACM Transactions on Parallel Computing from 2018 to 2025.

In July 2019, Bader joined the New Jersey Institute of Technology as a Distinguished Professor in the Ying Wu College of Computing and was named the first director of the school's new Institute for Data Science. The institute is home to research centers in AI, big data, medical informatics, and cybersecurity at NJIT and conducts both basic and applied research. In May 2020, Bader joined the leadership team of the NSF-sponsored Northeast Big Data Innovation Hub as its inaugural seed fund steering committee chair.

The National Institutes of Health (NIH) has appointed Bader as a member of the National Heart, Lung and Blood Advisory Council (NHLBAC).

=== First Linux supercomputer ===
Bader is credited with the development of the first Linux supercomputer using commodity parts. In 1998, while at the University of New Mexico, Bader sought to build a supercomputer running Linux using consumer off-the-shelf parts and a high-speed low-latency interconnection network. The prototype utilized an Alta Technologies "AltaCluster" of eight dual, 333 MHz, Intel Pentium II computers running a modified Linux kernel. Bader ported a significant amount of software to provide Linux support for necessary components as well as code from members of the National Computational Science Alliance (NCSA) to ensure interoperability, as none of it had been run on Linux previously. Using the successful prototype design, he led the development of Roadrunner, the first Linux supercomputer for open use by the national science and engineering community via the National Science Foundation's National Technology Grid. Roadrunner was put into production use in April 1999. At the time of its deployment, it was considered one of the 100 fastest supercomputers in the world. Though Linux-based clusters using consumer-grade parts, such as Beowulf, existed prior to the development of Bader's prototype and Roadrunner, they lacked the scalability, bandwidth, and parallel computing capabilities to be considered "true" supercomputers.

Soon after Roadrunner went into production, Bader led the technical design of "LosLobos," the first-ever Linux production system built by IBM. IBM turned Bader's design into the industry's first pre-assembled and pre-configured Linux server cluster for business. Today, all of the world's top 500 supercomputers are Linux HPC systems. A study by Hyperion Research estimates that the use of these supercomputers in product development in the automotive, aircraft, and pharmaceutical industries has generated an economic value of over $100 trillion in 25 years. Steve Wallach, a National Academy of Engineering (NAE) member and Seymour Cray Computer Engineering Award recipient, remarked that Bader's technical contributions and leadership are "one of the most significant technical foundations of HPC." Larry Smarr, a UC San Diego Distinguished Professor Emeritus, founding director of the National Center for Supercomputing Applications, and NAE member also cited Bader's early and continuing contributions to the development of Linux HPC as having "enormous historic resonance."

The Computer History Museum recognizes Bader on its Timeline of Computer History for developing the first Linux supercomputer in 1998. "Within a decade this design became the predominant architecture for all major supercomputers in the world."

== Awards and recognitions ==
2005

- NSF CAREER Award

2006

- IBM Faculty Award for making fundamental contributions to the design and optimization of parallel scientific libraries for multicore processors.

2007

- Georgia Tech College of Computing Dean's Award

2009

- IEEE Fellow

2010

- In June 2010, Intel supported Bader's research on graph analytics with a 3-year award from the Intel Labs Academic Research Office for the Parallel Algorithms for Non-Numeric Computing Program.
- Golden Core Member of the IEEE Computer Society
- IEEE Computer Society Meritorious Service Award

2011

- AAAS Fellow
- InsideHPC "Rock Star of High Performance Computing"

2012

- HPCWire "People to Watch"
- University of Maryland's Department of Electrical and Computer Engineering presented Bader as the first recipient of their Distinguished Alumni Award.

2013

- IEEE Computer Society's Technical Committee on Parallel Processing Outstanding Service Award

2014

- Georgia Tech College of Computing Outstanding Senior Faculty Research Award
- HPCWire "People to Watch"

2015

- Accenture Open Innovation Award.

2016

- IBM Faculty Award in Big Data / Analytics for optimizing graph analytics for cognitive computing.

2019

- SIAM Fellow
- Facebook AI System Hardware/Software Co-Design Research Award to develop "high-performance AI solutions for existing as well as future AI hardware."

2021

- ROI-NJ recognized Bader on its inaugural list of technology influencers.
- IEEE Computer Society Sidney Fernbach Award "For the development of Linux-based massively parallel production computers and for pioneering contributions to scalable discrete parallel algorithms for real-world applications."
- ACM Fellow "For contributions to high-performance computing systems, graph analytics, and technical leadership in parallel computing."

2022

- ROI-NJ Technology Influencer
- Innovation Hall of Fame, University of Maryland A. James Clark School of Engineering

2025

- The Mimms Museum of Technology and Art Hall of Fame Inductee
- Heatherington Award for Technology Innovation from the Mimms Museum of Technology and Art
- HPCwire's 35 HPC Legends of 2025

2026

- IEEE Computer Society Distinguished Contributor
- Inaugural cohort of the Scientific Computing World 75 (SCW75)
- Excellence in Research Prize and Medal, New Jersey Institute of Technology, 2026

== Personal life ==
Bader has one child.
