= HIPC =

HIPC may refer to:

- International Conference on High Performance Computing
- Heavily indebted poor countries

== See also ==
- HICP, Harmonised Index of Consumer Prices
