= Sherry Li =

Chinese American mathematician

Xiaoye Sherry Li is a researcher in numerical methods at the Lawrence Berkeley National Laboratory, where she works as a senior scientist. She is responsible there for the SuperLU package, a high-performance parallel system for solving sparse systems of linear equations by using their LU decomposition. At the Lawrence Berkeley National Laboratory, she heads the Scalable Solvers Group.

== Education ==
Li graduated from Tsinghua University in 1986, with a bachelor's degree in computer science. She moved to the United States for graduate study, earning a master's degree from Pennsylvania State University in 1990 and a Ph.D. in computer science from the University of California, Berkeley in 1996. Her doctoral dissertation, Sparse Gaussian Elimination on High Performance Computers, was supervised by James Demmel.

== Recognition ==
In 2016, she was elected as a SIAM Fellow "for advances in the development of fast and scalable sparse matrix algorithms and fostering their use in large-scale scientific and engineering applications". With Piyush Sao and Richard Vuduc she was awarded the 2022 SIAM Activity Group on Supercomputing Best Paper Prize.
