= Adriano Schneider =

- Born: August 20, 1988 (age 38); Porto Alegre, Rio Grande do Sul
- Education: University of North Carolina at Charlotte, Universidade Federal do Rio Grande do Sul, Pontificia Universidade Catolica do Rio Grande do Sul
- Scientific career
- Fields: Bioinformatics, Epidemiology
- Workplaces: University of California San Diego, University of North Carolina at Charlotte
- Doctoral advisor: Daniel Janies

Adriano de Bernardi Schneider, best known as Adriano Schneider (born August 20, 1988) is a Brazilian researcher who has been involved in the fight against the Zika virus in the United States in the last epidemic in Brazil in 2015.

In 2016, he won the Most Implementable Solution Award (sponsored by GE Foundation) for the creation of a dispositive (LAD) to combat mosquitoes in South America, as well as made contributions for the understanding of the Zika virus evolution.

== Education and career ==
Adriano de Bernardi Schneider was born on August 20, 1988, in Porto Alegre, RS, Brazil to Luis Antonio M. Schneider and Helena Beatriz de B. Schneider, who owned a ranch near the State border with Uruguay. He graduated from Colegio Anchieta (high school) in 2005 and went to attend the course of Biology at the Pontificia Universidade Católica do Rio Grande do Sul where obtained the bachelor's degree in Biological Sciences in 2009. In 2010 he went to the Agronomy College of the Universidade Federal do Rio Grande do Sul to obtain his M.S. degree in agronomy in 2012. In 2011 he went to the United States Department of Agriculture - Agricultural Research Service in Aberdeen, Idaho as a visiting scientist to work on his thesis. Following the completion of his Masters Program, in early 2013 he moved to Charlotte, NC to become a PhD student on the course of Bioinformatics and Computational Biology at the University of North Carolina at Charlotte. There he joined the Plant Pathways Elucidation Project where he was involved as a PhD Student and Team Leader to discover and describe novel health promoting plant compounds until mid 2015.

In 2015 he moved to the evolutionary biology field, getting involved with flavivirus research and combating the Zika virus. He was a member of the Zika Response Working Group. From late 2018 until 2021 Adriano was a Postdoctoral Scholar at the School of Medicine of the University of California San Diego working with HIV and Hepatitis viruses in the Evolutionary Biology group led by Dr. Joel Wertheim. He is currently a researcher at the Genomics Institute of the University of California Santa Cruz working with Drs. Russell Corbett-Detig and David Haussler on the spread of SARS-CoV-2.

== Memberships ==
Adriano is a member of the American Society for Virology, Society for Molecular Biology and Evolution, American Society of Tropical Medicine & Hygiene, and International Society for Infectious Diseases. He is also member of the editorial board of Contagion®, a leading digital and print publication that provides healthcare practitioners and specialists working in the field of infectious diseases with disease-specific information.
