= BRTF =

BRTF may refer to:

- Border Roads Task Force, Indian army road construction task force, part of the Border Roads Organisation
- Blue Ribbon Task Force, former organization that worked with the Marine Life Protection Act
- Blue Ribbon Task Force on Sustainable Digital Preservation and Access, former organization co-chaired by Francine Berman
