= Demmel =

Demmel is a surname. Notable people with the surname include:

- James Demmel (born 1955), American mathematician and computer scientist
- Phil Demmel (born 1967), American musician
