= Arvind (computer scientist) =

Indian computer scientist (1947–2024)

- Born: Arvind Mithal; 18 May 1947; India
- Died: 17 June 2024 (aged 77)
- Education: IIT Kanpur (B.Sc., 1969); University of Minnesota (M.S., 1972, Ph.D., 1973)
- Known for: Formal verification of large digital systems Development of dynamic dataflow architectures Parallel computing programming languages Id, pH; Compiling languages on parallel machines
- Spouse: Gita Singh
- Children: 2
- Scientific career
- Fields: Computer science
- Institutions: University of California, Irvine; Indian Institutes of Technology; Massachusetts Institute of Technology (MIT); University of Tokyo; Sandburst; Bluespec
- Thesis: Models for the Comparison of Memory Management Algorithms (1973)
- Doctoral advisor: Richard Yerkes Kain
- Doctoral students: David Culler; James Hoe; Keshav K Pingali

Arvind Mithal (18 May 1947 – 17 June 2024), known mononymously as Arvind, was an Indian computer scientist, the Johnson Professor of Computer Science and Engineering in the Computer Science and Artificial Intelligence Laboratory (CSAIL) at the Massachusetts Institute of Technology (MIT). He was a Fellow of the Institute of Electrical and Electronics Engineers (IEEE) and the Association for Computing Machinery (ACM). He was also elected as a member into the National Academy of Engineering in 2008 for contributions to dataflow and multithread computing and the development of tools for the high-level synthesis of digital electronics hardware.

== Career ==
Arvind's research interests included formal verification of large-scale digital systems using guarded atomic actions, memory models, and cache coherence protocols for parallel computing architectures and programming languages.

Past work was instrumental in the development of dynamic dataflow architectures, two parallel languages, Id and pH, and the compiling of such languages on parallel machines.

At IIT Kanpur, he earned a Bachelor of Science (B.Sc.) degree in technology (with an emphasis in electrical engineering) in 1969. In that process, he discovered that he was keenly interested in computers. Then, at the University of Minnesota, he earned a Master of Science (M.Sc.) in computer science in 1972, and a Doctor of Philosophy (Ph.D.) in computer science in 1973.

Arvind conducted his thesis research in operating systems on mathematical models of program behavior. At the University of California, Irvine, where he taught from 1974 to 1978, he became interested in computer architecture and programming languages.

Arvind taught at IIT's Kanpur campus in 1977 and 1978. In 1978, he joined the MIT faculty. He served as the Chief Technical Advisor to the United-Nations-sponsored Knowledge Based Computer Systems project in India from 1986 to 1992. During 1992–93, he was the Fujitsu Visiting Professor at the University of Tokyo.

In 1992, Arvind and his CSAIL team collaborated with Motorola in completing the Monsoon dataflow machine and associated software. A dozen Monsoons were installed at Los Alamos National Laboratory and other universities before Monsoon was retired to the Computer History Museum in California. In 2000, Arvind took two years off from teaching at MIT to build Sandburst, Inc, a fabless manufacturing semiconductor company. He served as its president until his return to MIT in 2002. In 2006, Sandburst was acquired by Broadcom Corporation.

In 2003, he cofounded Bluespec, Inc., headquartered in Waltham, Massachusetts. They produce proven electronic design automation (EDA) synthesis toolsets. With Lennart Augustsson, Arvind codeveloped the programming language Bluespec SystemVerilog (BSV), a high-level functional programming hardware description language, which is a Haskell variant extended to handle chip design and electronic design automation in general. He also worked with the Bluespec-related language Minispec.

He served as the General Chair for the International Conference on Supercomputing held in Cambridge, Massachusetts in June 2005. He has also served as the Engineering and Computer Science Jury Chair for the Infosys Prize from 2019 onwards.

Arvind was the first to occupy the N. Rama Rao Chair in the Department of Computer Science and Engineering at IIT. He served as chair from 1998 to 1999. Also during this time he taught a few weeks each semester at the CSE department of IIT, Kanpur.

Arvind's later research used term-rewriting systems (TRSs) for high-level specification and description of architectures and protocols. The Computation Structures Group at MIT, which he headed, uses TRSs to design faster hardware and allow for more exploration of designs.

== Death ==
Arvind died on 17 June 2024, at the age of 77.

== Published works ==
Along with R. S. Nikhil, Arvind published the book Implicit parallel programming in pH in 2001. "pH" is a programming language based on Haskell with special support for parallel processing.

Among the most significant and/or recent articles he authored or co-authored that have been published:

- James Hoe and Arvind, "Operation-Centric Hardware Descriptions and Synthesis", IEEE TCAD, September 2004
- Hari Balakrishnan, Srinivas Devadas, Doug Ehlert, and Arvind, "Rate Guarantees and Overload Protection in Input-Queued Switches", IEEE Infocom, March 2004.
- Dan Rosenband and Arvind, "Modular Scheduling of Guarded Atomic Actions", DAC41, June 2004
- Arvind, R.S. Nikhil, Daniel Rosenband and Nirav Dave, "High-level synthesis: An Essential Ingredient for Designing Complex ASICs", ICCAD'04, November 2004

Arvind also served on the editorial board of several journals including the Journal of Parallel and Distributed Computing, and the Journal of Functional Programming.

== Awards ==
Arvind received the following awards: the IEEE Computer Society Charles Babbage Award (1994), Distinguished Alumnus Award, I.I.T. Kanpur (1999), Distinguished Alumnus Award, University of Minnesota (2001), and the Outstanding Achievement Award from the University of Minnesota (2008).

He was selected as an IEEE Fellow in 1994 and an ACM Fellow in 2006. He was elected to the National Academy of Engineering in 2008 and was a member of the Computer Science and Artificial Intelligence Laboratory (CSAIL) at MIT.
