= David Kuck =

American computer scientist (born 1937)

David Jerome Kuck (born October 3, 1937) was a professor in the Computer Science Department the University of Illinois at Urbana-Champaign from 1965 to 1993. While at the University of Illinois at Urbana-Champaign he developed the Parafrase compiler system (1977), which was the first testbed for the development of automatic vectorization and related program transformations. In his role as Director (1986–93) of the Center for Supercomputing Research and Development (CSRD-UIUC), Kuck led the construction of the CEDAR project, a hierarchical shared-memory 32-processor SMP supercomputer completed in 1988 at the University of Illinois.

== Education and career ==
Kuck graduated from the University of Michigan, where he received a BSE in electrical engineering in 1959. He went on to study at Northwestern University and obtained a PhD in computer science in 1963 under the supervision of Gilbert Krulee.

He founded Kuck and Associates (KAI) in 1979 to build a line of industry-standard optimizing compilers especially focused upon exploiting parallelism. After CSRD, Kuck transferred his full attentions to KAI and its clients at various US National Laboratories. KAI was acquired by Intel in March 2000, where Kuck currently serves as an Intel Fellow, Software and Services Group (SSG), Developer Products Division (DPD).

Kuck was the sole software person on the ILLIAC IV project in contrast to all the other hardware-oriented members. Kuck is responsible not only for developing many of the initial ideas of how to restructure computer source code for parallelism but also trained many of that field's major players around the world.

== Honors ==
Kuck is a fellow of the American Association for the Advancement of Science, the Association for Computing Machinery (ACM), and the Institute of Electrical and Electronics Engineers. He was also elected a member of the National Academy of Engineering in 1991 for pioneering contributions to the theory and practice of parallelism in scientific computation. He has won the Eckert-Mauchly Award from ACM/IEEE and the IEEE Computer Society Charles Babbage Award. Kuck is a major contributor in creating OpenMP, a cross-platform, directive-based parallel programming approach which is especially friendly in multi-core environment. In 2010 Kuck was selected to receive the Ken Kennedy Award, given by ACM and the IEEE Computer Society for Innovations in High-Performance Computing.

== Personal life ==
Kuck is the father of Olympic silver medalist Jonathan Kuck.
