= Bill Gropp =

American computer scientist

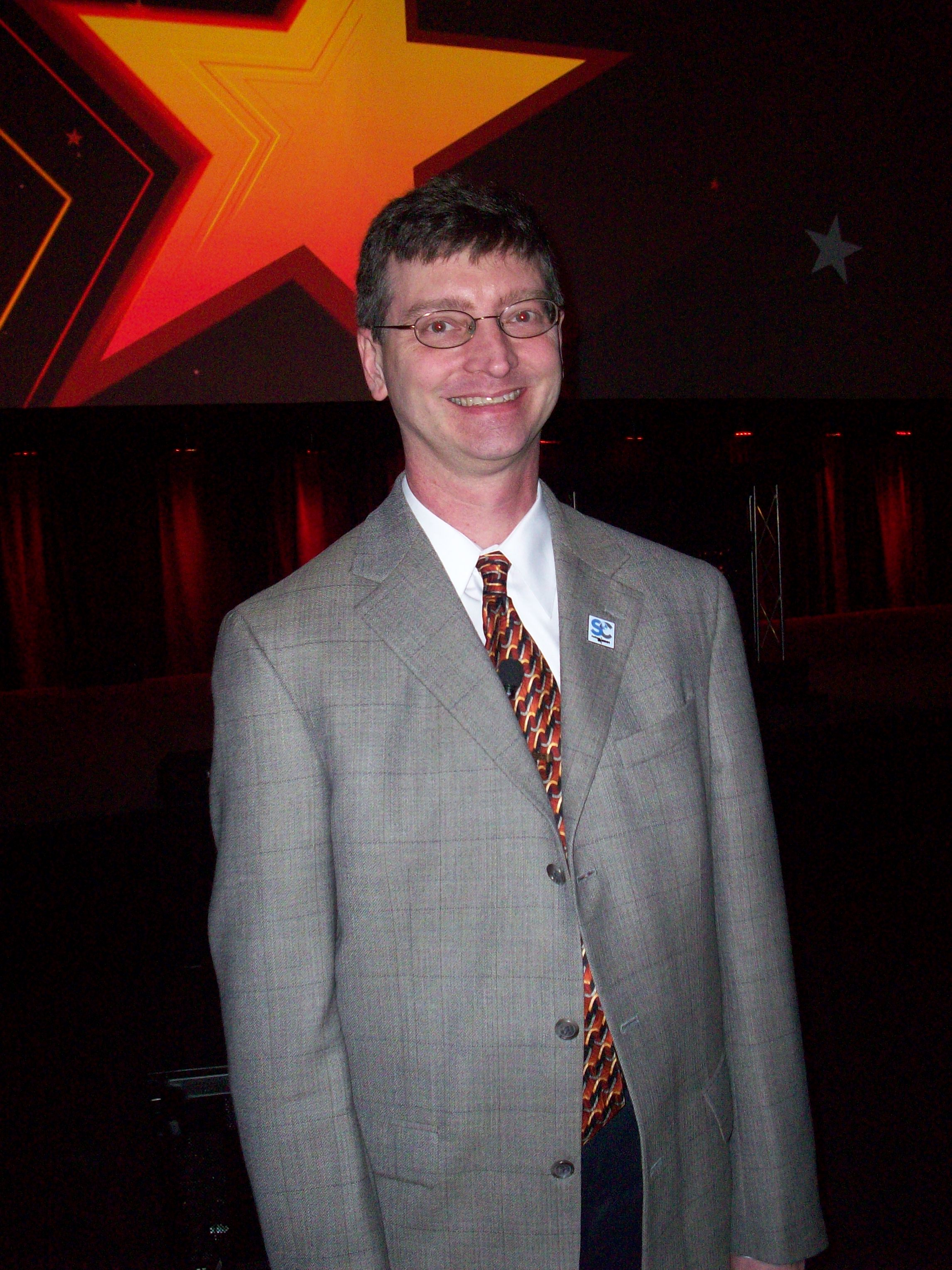
- Bill Gropp
- Education: Stanford University
- Awards: Sidney Fernbach Award; Ken Kennedy Award
- Scientific career
- Workplaces: Yale University; Argonne National Laboratory; University of Illinois

William Douglas Gropp is the director of the National Center for Supercomputing Applications (NCSA) and the Thomas M. Siebel Chair in the Department of Computer Science at the University of Illinois at Urbana–Champaign. He is also the founding Director of the Parallel Computing Institute. Gropp helped to create the Message Passing Interface, also known as MPI, and the Portable, Extensible Toolkit for Scientific Computation, also known as PETSc.

Gropp was awarded the Sidney Fernbach Award in 2008, "for outstanding contributions to the development of domain decomposition algorithms, scalable tools for the parallel numerical solution of PDEs, and the dominant HPC communications interface". In 2016, he was awarded the ACM/IEEE-CS Ken Kennedy Award "For highly influential contributions to the programmability of high-performance parallel and distributed computers, and extraordinary service to the profession."

In 2009, Gropp received an R&D 100 Award for PETSc. In February 2010, he was elected to the National Academy of Engineering, "For contributions to numerical software in the area of linear algebra and high-performance parallel and distributed computation." In March 2010, he was honored with the IEEE TCSC Medal for Excellence in Scalable Computing. He is a Fellow of ACM, IEEE, and SIAM, and an elected member of the National Academy of Engineering.

Gropp received his PhD at Stanford in 1982, under Joseph Oliger.
