= Franck Cappello =

French and American computer scientist

Franck Cappello is a French and American computer scientist, working at Argonne National Laboratory.

He was awarded the IEEE Computer Society Charles Babbage Award in 2024, and named as an ACM Fellow in 2025, "for contributions to parallel/distributed computing, resilience, and scientific data reduction" and IEEE Fellow, class of 2017 "for contributions to high-performance computing, fault tolerance, and grid-based computing".

He also received other multiple awards:

- For Scientific & Leadership Recognitions:
  - Argonne Distinguished Fellow, 2026
  - Secretary of DOE Honor's Award, 2026
  - Secretary of DOE Honor's Award, 2024
  - Europar Achievement Award, 2024
  - ACM HPDC Achievement Award, for pioneering contributions in methods, tools, and testbeds for resilient high performance parallel and distributed computing, 2022
  - IEEE TC Award for Editorial Service and Excellence, 2021
  - IEEE TCPP Outstanding Service and Contribution Award, 2018
- Technical Software Recognitions:
  - R&D 100 Award - SZ: A Lossy Compression Framework for Scientific Data, 2021
  - R&D 100 Award - Scalable Checkpoint/Restart, 2019
