= Keshav K Pingali =

American computer scientist

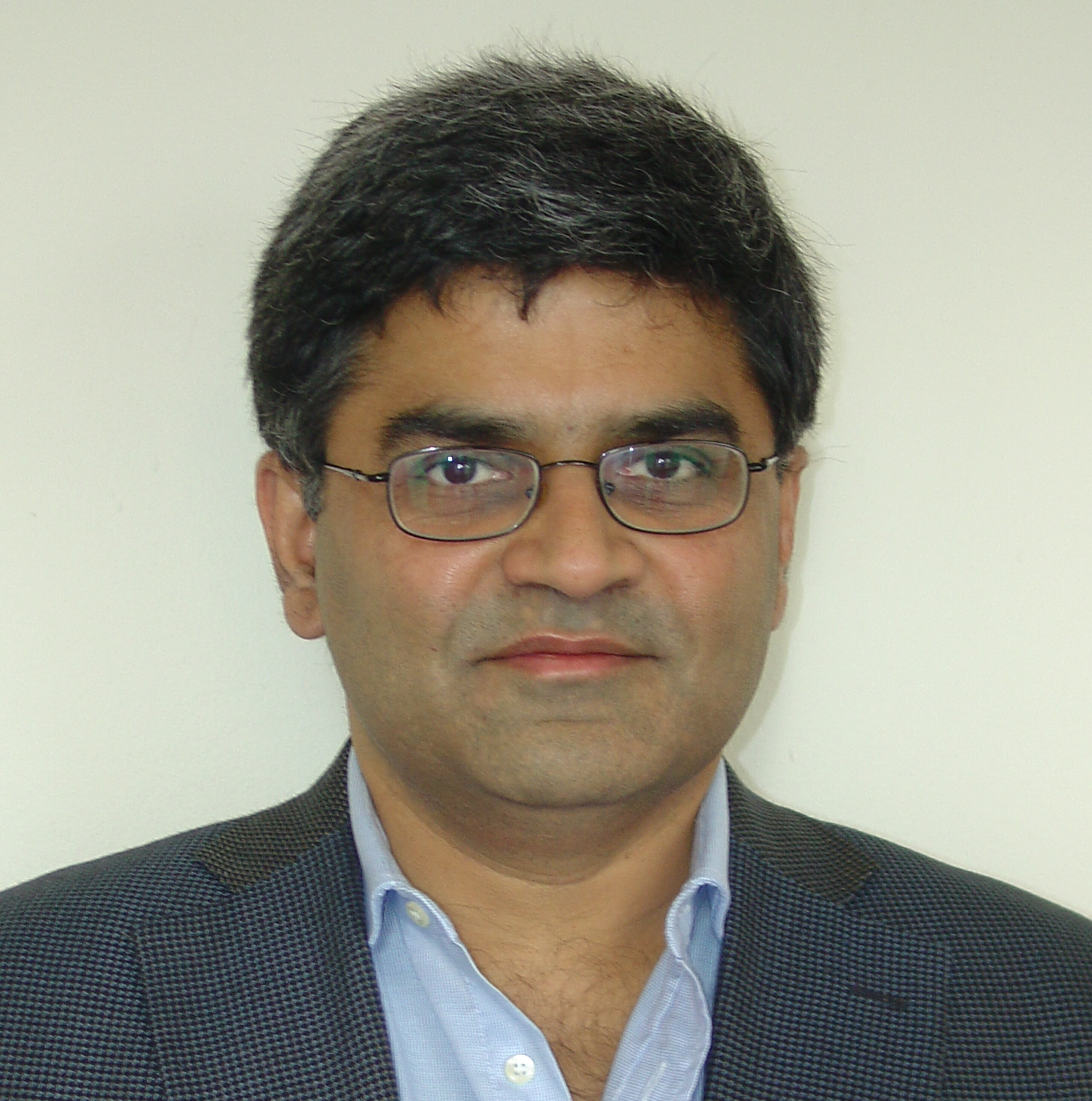
- Education: May 1978, B.Tech. IIT Kanpur; May 1983, SM and EE. MIT; May 1986, ScD. MIT
- Known for: Parallel computing; Programming languages and compilers; Scientific computing
- Awards: ACM SIGPLAN Prog Lang Achievement Award (2024); IEEE Charles Babbage Award (2023); ACM/IEEE CS Ken Kennedy Award (2023); Member of the Academia Europaea (2020); Distinguished Alumnus Award, IIT Kanpur (2013); President’s Gold Medal, IIT Kanpur (1978)
- Scientific career
- Fields: Computer Science
- Workplaces: Cornell; UT Austin
- Thesis: Demand-driven Evaluation on Dataflow Machines (1986)
- Doctoral advisor: Arvind

Notes
- Keshav K Pingali at the Mathematics Genealogy Project

Keshav K. Pingali is an American computer scientist, currently the W.A."Tex" Moncrief Chair of Grid and Distributed Computing at the University of Texas at Austin, and also a published author. He previously also held the India Chair of Computer Science at Cornell University and also the N. Rama Rao Professorship at Indian Institute of Technology. He is a Fellow of the American Association for the Advancement of Science, Association for Computing Machinery and Institute of Electrical and Electronics Engineers. In 2020, he was elected a Foreign Member of the Academia Europeana.

Keshav Pingali is the co-founder and CEO of Katana Graph, which is building a high-performance, scale-out platform for graph querying, graph analytics, graph mining and graph AI workloads. Katana Graph announced its 28.5 million in Series A funding in February 2021, and in April of that year, the startup also announced its partnership with Intel to optimize their graph engine for the new 3rd Gen Intel Xeon Scalable processor (IceLake) and for Optane, Intel's non-volatile memory system. Keshav was also the keynote speaker at the 2021 Knowledge Graph Conference.

== Awards and honors ==
- 2024. ACM SIGPLAN Programming Languages Achievement Award, for immense contributions to parallel computing.
- 2023. IEEE Computer Society Charles Babbage Award, for contributions to high-performance compilers and graph computing
- 2023. ACM/IEEE CS Ken Kennedy Award, for contributions to programmability of high-performance parallel computing on irregular algorithms and graph algorithms
- 2020. Member of Academia Europaea
- 2017. HPEC Graph Challenge Champion, with Chad Voegele, Yi-Shan Lu, and Sreepathi Pai, for the paper "Parallel triangle counting and k-truss identification using graph-centric methods"
- 2013. Distinguished Alumnus Award, IIT Kanpur
- 2012. ACM Fellow, for contributions to data-centric parallel programming and to parallel compilation theory and practice
- 2010. Fellow, IEEE Computer Society, for contributions to compilers and parallel computing
- 2009. Fellow, American Association for the Advancement of Science (AAAS).
- 1998. Russell Teaching Award, Cornell Arts and Science
- 1997. Ip-Lee Teaching Award, Cornell Engineering
- 1989. NSF Presidential Young Investigator Award, Cornell Engineering
- 1986. IBM Faculty Development Award, Cornell Engineering
- 1978. President’s Gold Medal, IIT Kanpur; awarded to the top graduating B.Tech. student.
- 1978. Lalit Narain Das Memorial Gold Medal, IIT Kanpur; awarded to the top graduating student in the Department of Electrical Engineering.
