= Katherine Yelick =

American computer scientist and academic

Katherine A. Yelick
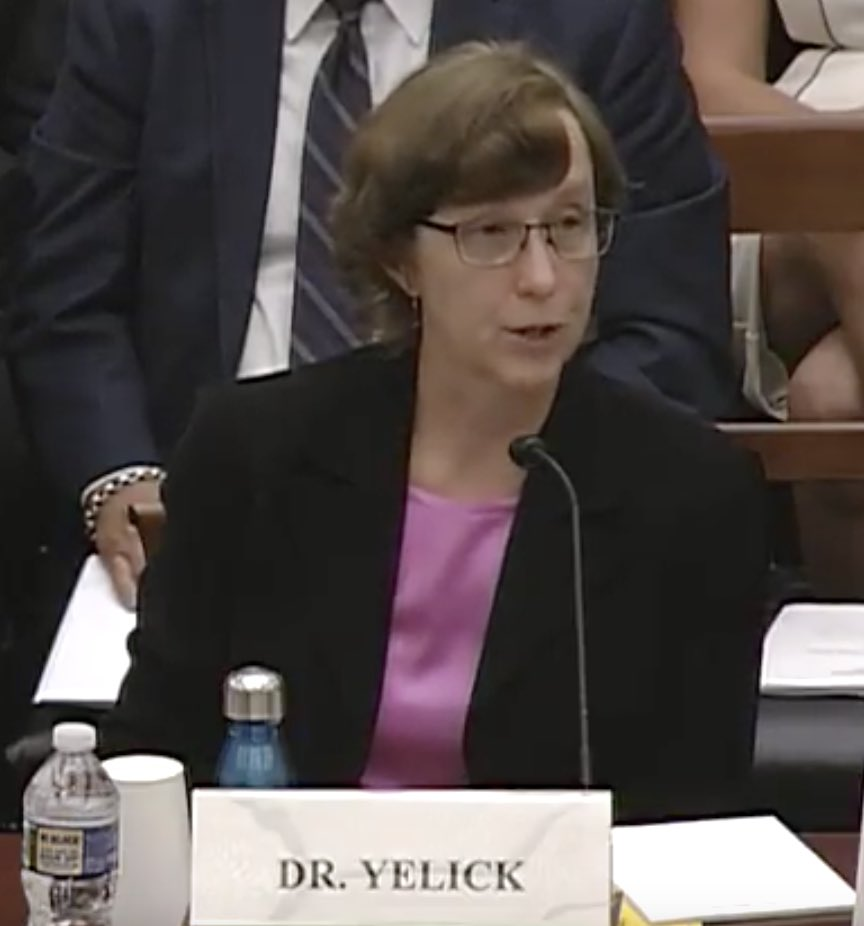
- Kathy Yelick from LBNL Testifies at House Hearing on Big Data Challenges and Advanced Computing
- Education: Massachusetts Institute of Technology
- Spouse: James Demmel
- Awards: ACM Fellow (2013); ACM Ken Kennedy Award (2015); National Academy of Engineering (2017); American Academy of Arts and Sciences (2017); American Association for the Advancement of Science (AAAS) (2018)
- Scientific career
- Fields: high performance computing programming languages parallel computing
- Workplaces: University of California, Berkeley; Lawrence Berkeley National Laboratory
- Thesis: Using abstraction in explicitly parallel programs (1990)
- Doctoral advisor: John Guttag
- Website: www.cs.berkeley.edu/~yelick/

Katherine "Kathy" Anne Yelick is an American computer scientist and director of Lawrence Berkeley National Laboratory, also known as Berkeley Lab. In May 2026, the University of California Board of Regents appointed her as the director of Berkeley Lab, starting on July 1, 2026. She is also the Robert S. Pepper Distinguished Professor of Electrical Engineering and Computer Sciences at UC Berkeley. From 2020-2026 she was vice chancellor for research and the Robert S. Pepper Professor of Electrical Engineering and Computer Sciences at the University of California, Berkeley. She was Associate Laboratory Director for Computing Sciences at Berkeley Lab from 2010–2019.

== Education and scientific career ==
Katherine Yelick received her SB, SM, and PhD in computer science from the Massachusetts Institute of Technology, completing her thesis in 1990. She joined the faculty at the University of California, Berkeley in 1991, and was appointed a joint-appointment faculty research scientist at Lawrence Berkeley National Laboratory in 1996. She has done research across a broad range of computing sciences: high performance computing, systems programming, parallel algorithms, and computational genomics.

Yelick is known for her work in partitioned global address space programming languages, including co-inventing the Unified Parallel C (UPC) and Titanium languages. She was a co-author of the first book to explain the language Unified Parallel C and its use. She also led the Sparsity project, the first automatically tuned library for sparse matrix kernels, and she co-led the development of the Optimized Sparse Kernel Interface (OSKI).

Yelick was the Principal Investigator for the ExaBiome project, which used concepts and approaches from partitioned global address space languages and developed scalable high-performance algorithms and implementations for microbial analysis. The ExaBiome project was one of several scientific application projects created as part of the Exascale Computing Project, which was executed across several Department of Energy national laboratories from 2016–2024.

== Academic and Research Leadership ==
Yelick served from 2008 to 2012 as the director of the National Energy Research Scientific Computing Center (NERSC), the scientific computing center that provides high-performance computing facilities and associated expertise to over 9,000 scientists supported by the U.S. Department of Energy Office of Science. In 2010, she was appointed the Associate Laboratory Director for Computing Sciences at Berkeley Lab, overseeing NERSC, the high-speed research network Energy Sciences Network (ESnet), and the Computing Research Division. In this role she managed an organization with a research budget of about $150 million.

In her role as associate laboratory director, Yelick led the development of the 2019 Computing Sciences Strategic Plan for Berkeley Lab. In the introduction to that plan, she said:

Computing has transformed nearly every aspect of scientific inquiry — across disciplines and across scales — from the behavior of subatomic particles to the formation of structures in the early universe, from the assembly of the human genome to the evolution of earth systems.

She also led a major initiative, Machine Learning (ML) for Science, in which researchers developed advanced machine learning tools to accelerate discovery in a wide range of scientific disciplines. In 2021, Yelick delivered the inaugural lecture in the distinguished lecture series at the Harvard Institute for Applied Computational Science, with the title "Machine Learning in Science: Applications, Algorithms, and Architectures."

Since 2021, Yelick has served as the vice chancellor for research (VCR) at the University of California, Berkeley. In this role, she provides the primary leadership in research policy, planning, and administration, and also leads university-industry relations, research compliance, research communications, and federal research development. The VCR supervises over fifty campus research units, twelve research museums and remote field stations, and the research administration offices. The research enterprise at UC Berkeley attracted $965 million in extramural support in the fiscal year ending June 30, 2025.

== Awards and honors ==
From 2012 to 2015, Yelick received three awards from the Association for Computing Machinery (ACM).

- 2012: She was named as an ACM Fellow "for [her] contributions to parallel computing languages that have been used in both the research community and in production environments."
- 2013: She received the ACM-W Athena Lecturer award at SC13 "for her contributions to parallel programming languages that improve programmer productivity."
- 2015 She received the ACM Ken Kennedy Award "for advancing the programmability of HPC systems, strategic national leadership, and mentorship in academia and government labs."

In 2017 Yelick was elected to both the National Academy of Engineering and to the American Academy of Arts and Sciences. The NAE award was "for software innovation and leadership in high-performance computing." The American Academy citation said that "her research enables use of new high-performance architectures and eases programming of applications with irregular communication patterns." The following year she was elected as a fellow of the American Association for the Advancement of Science.

At the 2019 ACM/IEEE Supercomputing Conference SC19 Yelick was honored by HPCwire as their Editor’s Choice for Outstanding Leadership in HPC.

== National service ==
Yelick serves on the executive committee for the Division on Engineering and Physical Sciences of the National Academies of Sciences, Engineering, and Medicine (NASEM). This Division provides independent and authoritative advice to the federal government and the nation on important science and technology policy issues in the areas of national security, space and aerospace, energy, infrastructure, manufacturing, materials, physics, astronomy, mathematics and operations research, information technology, and telecommunications.

From 2021 to 2023, Yelick served as chair of the NASEM study committee on Post-Exascale Computing for the National Nuclear Security Administration. Congress requested this study in the 2021 National Defense Authorization Act, charging it with "reviewing the future of computing beyond exascale computing to meet national security needs at the National Nuclear Security Administration."

== Personal life ==
Yelick is married to University of California, Berkeley professor James Demmel, who is also an ACM Fellow and works in computer science and numerical linear algebra.
