= Srinivas Aluru =

American computer scientist

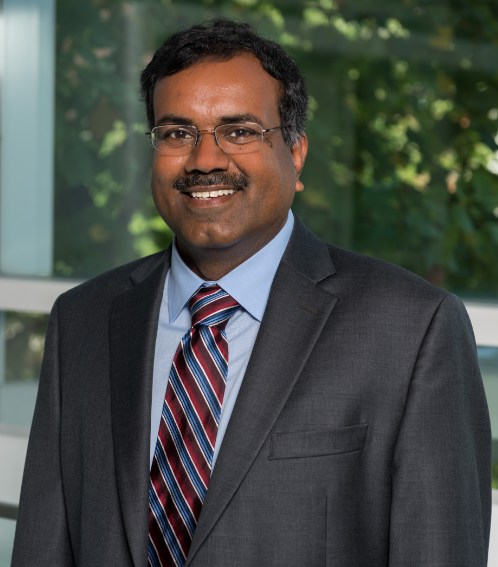
- Citizenship: American
- Education: Iowa State University
- Awards: John V. Atanasoff Discovery Award (2017); IEEE Fellow (2010); AAAS Fellow (2010); Swarnajayanti Fellowship (2007-2012); IEEE Computer Society Golden Core; IEEE Computer Society Meritorious Service; NSF Career (1997); ACM Fellow (2020); SIAM Fellow (2020); IEEE Computer Society Charles Babbage Award (2025)
- Scientific career
- Fields: High performance computing, data science, bioinformatics, scientific computing, string algorithms
- Workplaces: Iowa State University; Georgia Institute of Technology
- Thesis: Distribution-independent hierarchical N-body methods
- Doctoral advisor: John Gustafson, G.M. Prabhu

Srinivas Aluru is a professor in the School of Computational Science and Engineering at Georgia Institute of Technology, and co-executive director for the Georgia Tech Interdisciplinary Research Institute in Data Engineering and Science. His main areas of research are high performance computing, data science, bioinformatics and systems biology, combinatorial methods in scientific computing, and string algorithms. Aluru is a Fellow of the American Association for the Advancement of Science (AAAS) and the Institute for Electrical and Electronic Engineers (IEEE). He is best known for his research contributions in parallel algorithms and applications, interdisciplinary research in bioinformatics and computational biology, and particularly the intersection of these two fields.

== Education ==
Aluru completed his B.Tech. in computer science at the Indian Institute of Technology Madras in the year 1989. He then received M.S. and Ph.D. degrees in computer science in 1991 and 1994, both from Iowa State University. His doctoral thesis was "Distribution-independent hierarchical N-body methods".

== Career and research ==
Aluru began his career in 1991 as a research assistant at Ames Laboratory. After earning Ph.D., he briefly worked at Syracuse University as a visiting assistant professor before joining as an assistant professor in the Dept. of Computer Science at New Mexico State University. In 1999, he returned to his alma mater to serve as a faculty member in the Electrical and Computer Engineering Department. At Iowa State, he held Stanley Chair in Interdisciplinary Engineering (2006–2009) and the Mehl Professorship (2009–2013). He chaired the interdepartmental bioinformatics program (2005–2007) and served as associate chair for research and graduate education in the ECE department (2003–2006). He won several university research awards including early career, mid-career, and outstanding research achievement awards, and led research in high performance computing and bioinformatics. In 2013, he shifted to the School of Computational Science and Engineering at Georgia Institute of Technology.

Aluru's research focus has centered around contributions to parallel algorithms and bioinformatics, particularly genomics. He pioneered the development of parallel methods in computational biology, and development of algorithms and software for high-throughput DNA sequencing analysis and its applications. In this context, some of his group's work led to the development of fundamental string algorithms, particularly for constructing suffix arrays and algorithms for approximate sequence matching. He also solved the open problem of computing string edit distance or biological sequence alignments in optimal time and space. He collaborated with domain scientists on several high impact projects, including sequencing of the maize genome, finding novel genes in maize, and uncovering genetic mechanisms that underlie growth and drought response in plants.

An early pioneer in big data, Aluru led one of the eight inaugural mid-scale NSF-NIH Big Data projects awarded in the first round of federal big data investments in 2012. He has contributed to NITRD and OSTP led white house workshops, and NSF and DOE led efforts to create and nurture big data research. He led the efforts to create the NSF South Big Data Regional Innovation Hub, that nurtures big data partnerships between organizations in the 16 U.S. Southern States and Washington, D.C.

== Awards ==
- AAAS Fellow, "for distinguished contributions to high performance computational biology, particularly for enabling large-scale genome analysis and systems biology through creation and application of novel parallel methods." (2010)
- IEEE Fellow, "for contributions to computational biology." (2010)
- ACM Fellow, "for contributions to parallel methods in computational biology and leadership in data science." (2020)
- SIAM Fellow, "for contributions to sequential and parallel discrete algorithms in computational genomics, and leadership in data science and engineering." (2020)
- IEEE Computer Society Charles Babbage Award, "for pioneering contributions to the field of Parallel Computational Biology." (2025)

== Selected publications ==
- Schnable, Patrick S.; Ware, Doreen; Fulton, Robert S.; Stein, Joshua C.; Wei, Fusheng; Pasternak, Shiran; Liang, Chengzhi; Zhang, Jianwei; Fulton, Lucinda (2009-11-20). "The B73 Maize Genome: Complexity, Diversity, and Dynamics". Science. 326 (5956): 1112–1115. Bibcode:2009Sci...326.1112S. doi:10.1126/science.1178534. ISSN 0036-8075. PMID 19965430. S2CID 21433160.
- Ko, Pang; Aluru, Srinivas (2003-06-25). "Space Efficient Linear Time Construction of Suffix Arrays". Combinatorial Pattern Matching. Lecture Notes in Computer Science. Vol. 2676. Springer, Berlin, Heidelberg. pp. 200–210. doi:10.1007/3-540-44888-8_15. ISBN 978-3-540-44888-4.
- Huang, Xiaoqiu; Wang, Jianmin; Aluru, Srinivas; Yang, Shiaw-Pyng; Hillier, LaDeana (2003-09-01). "PCAP: A Whole-Genome Assembly Program". Genome Research. 13 (9): 2164–2170. doi:10.1101/gr.1390403. ISSN 1088-9051. PMC 403719. PMID 12952883.
- Kim, Dong Kyue; Sim, Jeong Seop; Park, Heejin; Park, Kunsoo (2003-06-25). "Linear-Time Construction of Suffix Arrays". Combinatorial Pattern Matching. Lecture Notes in Computer Science. Vol. 2676. Springer, Berlin, Heidelberg. pp. 186–199. doi:10.1007/3-540-44888-8_14. ISBN 978-3-540-44888-4.
- Yu, Xiaofei; Li, Lei; Zola, Jaroslaw; Aluru, Maneesha; Ye, Huaxun; Foudree, Andrew; Guo, Hongqing; Anderson, Sarah; Aluru, Srinivas (2011-02-01). "A brassinosteroid transcriptional network revealed by genome-wide identification of BESI target genes in Arabidopsis thaliana". The Plant Journal. 65 (4): 634–646. Bibcode:2011PlJ....65..634Y. doi:10.1111/j.1365-313X.2010.04449.x. ISSN 1365-313X. PMID 21214652.
- Aluru, Srinivas (2005-12-21). Handbook of Computational Molecular Biology. CRC Press. ISBN 978-1-4200-3627-5.
- Yang, X.; Chockalingam, S. P.; Aluru, S. (2013-01-01). "A survey of error-correction methods for next-generation sequencing". Briefings in Bioinformatics. 14 (1): 56–66. doi:10.1093/bib/bbs015. ISSN 1467-5463. PMID 22492192.
- Aluru, Srinivas (2005). "Space efficient linear time construction of suffix arrays". Journal of Discrete Algorithms. 3 (2–4): 143–156. doi:10.1016/j.jda.2004.08.002.
- Yang, X.; Dorman, K. S.; Aluru, S. (2010-10-15). "Reptile: representative tiling for short read error correction". Bioinformatics. 26 (20): 2526–2533. doi:10.1093/bioinformatics/btq468. ISSN 1367-4803. PMID 20834037.
- Ott, Michael; Zola, Jaroslaw; Stamatakis, Alexandros; Aluru, Srinivas (2007). "Large-scale maximum likelihood-based phylogenetic analysis on the IBM Blue Gene/L". Proceedings of the 2007 ACM/IEEE conference on Supercomputing - SC '07. p. 1. doi:10.1145/1362622.1362628. ISBN 978-1-59593-764-3. S2CID 16113442.
- Kalyanaraman, A. (2003-06-01). "Efficient clustering of large EST data sets on parallel computers". Nucleic Acids Research. 31 (11): 2963–2974. doi:10.1093/nar/gkg379. ISSN 0305-1048. PMC 156714. PMID 12771222.
- Rajko, S.; Aluru, S. (December 2004). "Space and time optimal parallel sequence alignments". IEEE Transactions on Parallel and Distributed Systems. 15 (12): 1070–1081. Bibcode:2004ITPDS..15.1070R. doi:10.1109/TPDS.2004.86. ISSN 1045-9219. S2CID 1183248.
