= Haesun Park =

South Korean American mathematician

- 박혜선
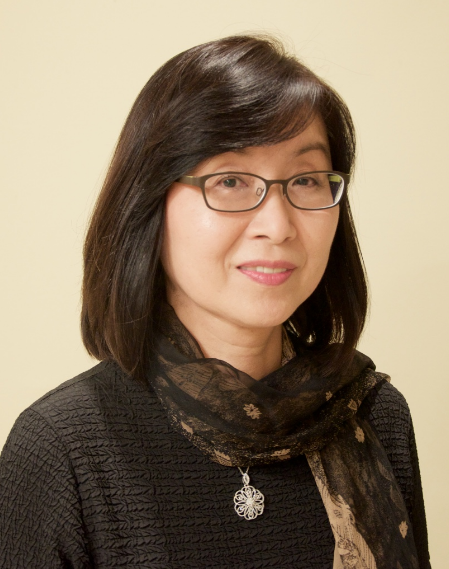
- Park in October 2017
- Citizenship: American
- Education: Seoul National University; Cornell University
- Awards: IEEE Fellow, SIAM Fellow
- Scientific career
- Fields: Data and visual analytics; Numerical algorithms; Parallel computing
- Workplaces: Georgia Tech College of Computing
- Doctoral advisor: Franklin Tai-Cheung Luk
- Website: www.cc.gatech.edu/~hpark/

Haesun Park (Korean: 박혜선) is a professor and chair of Computational Science and Engineering at the Georgia Institute of Technology. She is an IEEE Fellow, ACM Fellow, and Society for Industrial and Applied Mathematics Fellow. Park's main areas of research are Numerical Algorithms, Data Analysis, Visual Analytics and Parallel Computing. She has co-authored over 100 articles in peer-reviewed journals and conferences.

== Education ==
Park graduated in 1981 from Seoul National University with a bachelor's degree in mathematics, and went on to graduate studies in computer science at Cornell University, earning a master's degree in 1985 and a Ph.D. in 1987 under the supervision of Franklin Tai-Cheung Luk.

== Career ==
Park started her teaching career at the University of Minnesota as Assistant Professor and later became Associate Professor in the university. From 1998 to 2005, she was a professor in the department of computer science and engineering at the University of Minnesota. Park was a program director at the National Science Foundation from 2003 until 2005, before moving to Georgia Tech in 2005. She has also held an affiliation with the Korea Institute for Advanced Study since 2008. Park led the Foundations of Data and Visual Analytics (FODAVA) center and received $3 million grant to support emerging field of massive data analysis and visual analytics. Currently, she serves on the Data Analytics Selection Committee of SDM/IBM (SIAM Data Mining) and was a member of SIAM Fellow Selection Committee from 2015 to 2017. Park was named chair of the School of Computational Science and Engineering at Georgia Tech in 2020.

In 2013 she became a fellow of the Society for Industrial and Applied Mathematics "for contributions to numerical analysis and the data sciences". In 2020, she became a fellow of the Association for Computing Machinery (ACM) "for contributions to numerical algorithms, data analytics, and leadership in computational science and engineering." Parks also sits on the editorial board of BIT Numerical Mathematics, and International Journal of Bioinformatics Research and Applications. Parks also plays leadership roles in: International Journal of Bioinformatics Research and Applications, SDM, IEEE Transactions on Pattern Analysis and Machine Intelligence, BIT Numerical Mathematics and others. She was granted the patent for Method and apparatus for high dimensional data visualization with three others.

== Other work ==
- 2004–Present: Founding editorial board member, International Journal of Bioinformatics Research and Applications
- 2010–2014: Editorial board member, IEEE Transactions on Pattern Analysis and Machine Intelligence
- 2004–2010: Editorial board member, Society for Industrial and Applied Mathematics
- 2002–2009: Editorial board member, BIT Numerical Mathematics
- 1999–2005: Editorial board member, American Mathematical Society
- 1993–1999: Editorial board member, SIAM Journal on Scientific Computing

== Selected publications ==
- Ding, Chris; Li, Tao; Peng, Wei; Park, Haesun (2006). "Orthogonal nonnegative matrix t-factorizations for clustering". Proceedings of the 12th ACM SIGKDD international conference on Knowledge discovery and data mining. KDD '06. New York, NY, USA: ACM. pp. 126–135. doi:10.1145/1150402.1150420. ISBN 978-1595933393. S2CID 165018.
- Kim, H.; Park, H. (2007-06-15). "Sparse non-negative matrix factorizations via alternating non-negativity-constrained least squares for microarray data analysis". Bioinformatics. 23 (12): 1495–1502. doi:10.1093/bioinformatics/btm134. ISSN 1367-4803. PMID 17483501.
- Kim, H.; Golub, G. H.; Park, H. (2005-01-15). "Missing value estimation for DNA microarray gene expression data: local least squares imputation". Bioinformatics. 21 (2): 187–198. doi:10.1093/bioinformatics/bth499. ISSN 1367-4803. PMID 15333461.
- Kim, H.; Park, H. (2008-01-01). "Nonnegative Matrix Factorization Based on Alternating Nonnegativity Constrained Least Squares and Active Set Method". SIAM Journal on Matrix Analysis and Applications. 30 (2): 713–730. CiteSeerX 10.1.1.70.3485. doi:10.1137/07069239X. ISSN 0895-4798.
- Howland, P.; Park, H. (August 2004). "Generalizing discriminant analysis using the generalized singular value decomposition". IEEE Transactions on Pattern Analysis and Machine Intelligence. 26 (8): 995–1006. Bibcode:2004ITPAM..26..995H. CiteSeerX 10.1.1.67.9793. doi:10.1109/TPAMI.2004.46. ISSN 0162-8828. PMID 15641730. S2CID 206763885.
- Kim, J.; Park, H. (2011-01-01). "Fast Nonnegative Matrix Factorization: An Active-Set-Like Method and Comparisons". SIAM Journal on Scientific Computing. 33 (6): 3261–3281. Bibcode:2011SJSC...33.3261K. CiteSeerX 10.1.1.419.798. doi:10.1137/110821172. ISSN 1064-8275.
- Ye, Jieping; Janardan, R.; Park, C. H.; Park, H. (August 2004). "An optimization criterion for generalized discriminant analysis on undersampled problems". IEEE Transactions on Pattern Analysis and Machine Intelligence. 26 (8): 982–994. Bibcode:2004ITPAM..26..982Y. CiteSeerX 10.1.1.2.438. doi:10.1109/TPAMI.2004.37. ISSN 0162-8828. PMID 15641729. S2CID 1378528.
- Kim, Hyunsoo; Peg, Howland; Park, Haesun (2005). "Dimension Reduction in Text Classification with Support Vector Machines". Journal of Machine Learning Research. 6 (Jan). ISSN 1533-7928.
- Kim, H.; Park, H. (2003-08-01). "Protein secondary structure prediction based on an improved support vector machines approach". Protein Engineering Design and Selection. 16 (8): 553–560. CiteSeerX 10.1.1.411.6185. doi:10.1093/protein/gzg072. ISSN 1741-0126. PMID 12968073.
- Rosen, J.; Park, H.; Glick, J. (1996-01-01). "Total Least Norm Formulation and Solution for Structured Problems". SIAM Journal on Matrix Analysis and Applications. 17 (1): 110–126. doi:10.1137/S0895479893258802. ISSN 0895-4798.
- Howland, P.; Jeon, M.; Park, H. (2003-01-01). "Structure Preserving Dimension Reduction for Clustered Text Data Based on the Generalized Singular Value Decomposition". SIAM Journal on Matrix Analysis and Applications. 25 (1): 165–179. CiteSeerX 10.1.1.69.4580. doi:10.1137/S0895479801393666. ISSN 0895-4798.
- Luk, Franklin T.; Park, Haesun (1988-04-01). "An analysis of algorithm-based fault tolerance techniques". Journal of Parallel and Distributed Computing. 5 (2): 172–184. doi:10.1016/0743-7315(88)90027-5.
- Park, Haesun; Jeon, Moongu; Rosen, J. Ben (2003-06-01). "Lower Dimensional Representation of Text Data Based on Centroids and Least Squares". BIT Numerical Mathematics. 43 (2): 427–448. doi:10.1023/A:1026039313770. ISSN 0006-3835. S2CID 9629383.
- Kuang, D.; Ding, C.; Park, H. (2012-04-26). Proceedings of the 2012 SIAM International Conference on Data Mining. Society for Industrial and Applied Mathematics. pp. 106–117. doi:10.1137/1.9781611972825.10. ISBN 9781611972320.
