= Yves Robert (computer scientist) =

French computer scientist

Yves Robert is a French computer scientist. He is a full professor at École normale supérieure de Lyon. He co-authored "A Guide to Algorithm Design" with Anne Benoît and Frédéric Vivien.

He was awarded the IEEE Computer Society Charles Babbage Award in 2020.
