= Ken Kennedy Award =

Computer science award

The Ken Kennedy Award, established in 2009 by the Association for Computing Machinery and the IEEE Computer Society in memory of Ken Kennedy, is awarded annually and recognizes substantial contributions to programmability and productivity in computing and substantial community service or mentoring contributions. The award includes a $5,000 honorarium and the award recipient will be announced at the ACM - IEEE Supercomputing Conference.

== Ken Kennedy Award Past Recipients ==
Source: IEEE

- 2023 Keshav K Pingali. "For contributions to programmability of high-performance parallel computing on irregular algorithms and graph algorithms."
- 2022 Ian Foster. "For contributions to programmability and productivity in computing via the establishment of new programming models and foundational science services."
- 2021 David Abramson. "For innovation in parallel and distributed computing tools with broad applications, as well as leadership contributions to professional service, creating international technical communities, and mentoring."
- 2020 Vivek Sarkar. "For foundational technical contributions to the area of programmability and productivity in parallel computing, as well as leadership contributions to professional service, mentoring, and teaching."
- 2019 Geoffrey Charles Fox. "For foundational contributions to parallel computing methodology, algorithms and software, data analysis, and their interface with broad classes of applications, and mentoring students at minority-serving institutions".
- 2018 Sarita Adve. "For research contributions and leadership in the development of memory consistency models for C++ and Java, for service to numerous computer science organizations, and for exceptional mentoring".
- 2017 Jesus Labarta. "For his contributions to programming models and performance analysis tools for High Performance Computing".
- 2016 William Gropp. "For highly influential contributions to the programmability of high performance parallel and distributed computers."
- 2015 Katherine Yelick. "For advancing the programmability of HPC systems, strategic national leadership, and mentorship in academia and government labs."
- 2014 Charles E. Leiserson. "For enduring influence on parallel computing systems and their adoption into mainstream use through scholarly research and development and for distinguished mentoring of computer science leaders and students."
- 2013 Jack Dongarra. "For influential contributions to mathematical software, performance measurement, and parallel programming, and significant leadership and service within the HPC community."
- 2012 Mary Lou Soffa. "For contributions to compiler technology and software engineering, exemplary service to the profession, and life-long dedication to mentoring and improving diversity in computing."
- 2011 Susan L. Graham. "For foundational compilation algorithms and programming tools; research and discipline leadership; and exceptional mentoring."
- 2010 David Kuck. "For his pioneering contributions to compiler technology and parallel computing, the profound impact of his research on industry, and the widespread and long-lasting influence of his teaching and mentoring."
- 2009 Francine Berman. "For her influential leadership in the design, development and deployment of national-scale cyber infrastructure, her inspiring work as a teacher and mentor, and her exemplary service to the high performance community."

== See also ==
- List of computer science awards

== Nomination Process ==
- IEEE Computer Society Nomination Process
