= Edmond Chow =

- Born: Edmond T Chow
- Citizenship: American
- Education: University of Waterloo, University of Minnesota
- Awards: ACM Gordon Bell Prize, PECASE
- Scientific career
- Fields: Numerical methods, Scientific Computing, High-Performance Computing
- Workplaces: Georgia Tech College of Computing
- Website: www.cc.gatech.edu/~echow

Edmond Chow is a full professor in the School of Computational Science and Engineering of Georgia Institute of Technology. His main areas of research are in designing numerical methods for high-performance computing and applying these methods to solve large-scale scientific computing problems.

Chow was previously with the Center for Applied Scientific Computing, Lawrence Livermore National Laboratory from 1998 to 2005, and D. E. Shaw Research, New York, from 2005 to 2010. He has served as associate editor for SIAM Journal on Scientific Computing (2008-2016) and ACM Transactions on Mathematical Software (2012-present). He was co-chair of the SIAM Conference on Parallel Processing for Scientific Computing in 2014, and algorithms chair of ACM/IEEE International Conference for High Performance Computing, Networking, Storage and Analysis in 2012. Chow has co-authored over 60 articles in peer-reviewed journals and conferences.

== Education ==
Chow received a Hons. B.A.Sc degree in Systems Design Engineering from the University of Waterloo and a Ph.D. degree in Computer Science (minor in Aerospace Engineering) from the University of Minnesota.

== Research ==
Chow is director of the Intel Parallel Computing Center on High-Performance Scientific Simulation. He and his group has developed high-performance, parallel software for quantum chemistry and coarse-grained biochemical simulations. Chow also leads a Department of Energy project collaboration between four institutions on asynchronous iterative methods for extreme-scale computers.

== Major honors and awards ==
- SIAM Fellow in the 2021 class of fellows, "for contributions to computational science and engineering in the areas of numerical linear algebra and high-performance computing".
- Best paper award IEEE International Parallel & Distributed Processing Symposium, 2013 and 2014
- ACM Gordon Bell Prize, 2009
- Best Paper Award ACM/IEEE International Conference for High Performance, Computing, Networking, Storage and Analysis, 2006 and 2009
- U.S. Presidential Early Career Award for Scientists and Engineers (PECASE), 2002
- U.S. Department of Energy Office of Science Early Career Scientist and Engineer Award, 2002

== Major publications ==
- Chow, Edmond; Skolnick, Jeffrey (2015-12-01). "Effects of confinement on models of intracellular macromolecular dynamics". Proceedings of the National Academy of Sciences. 112 (48): 14846–14851. Bibcode:2015PNAS..11214846C. doi:10.1073/pnas.1514757112. ISSN 0027-8424. PMC 4672785. PMID 26627239.
- Chow, Edmond; Skolnick, Jeffrey (2017-06-06). "DNA Internal Motion Likely Accelerates Protein Target Search in a Packed Nucleoid". Biophysical Journal. 112 (11): 2261–2270. Bibcode:2017BpJ...112.2261C. doi:10.1016/j.bpj.2017.04.049. ISSN 0006-3495. PMC 5474843. PMID 28591599.
- Chow, E.; Patel, A. (2015-01-01). "Fine-Grained Parallel Incomplete LU Factorization". SIAM Journal on Scientific Computing. 37 (2): C169–C193. Bibcode:2015SJSC...37C.169C. doi:10.1137/140968896. ISSN 1064-8275.
- Chow, E.; Saad, Y. (2014-01-01). "Preconditioned Krylov Subspace Methods for Sampling Multivariate Gaussian Distributions". SIAM Journal on Scientific Computing. 36 (2): A588–A608. Bibcode:2014SJSC...36A.588C. doi:10.1137/130920587. ISSN 1064-8275.
- Chow, Edmond; Liu, Xing; Misra, Sanchit; Dukhan, Marat; Smelyanskiy, Mikhail; Hammond, Jeff R.; Du, Yunfei; Liao, Xiang-Ke; Dubey, Pradeep (2016-02-01). "Scaling up Hartree–Fock calculations on Tianhe-2". The International Journal of High Performance Computing Applications. 30 (1): 85–102. doi:10.1177/1094342015592960. ISSN 1094-3420. S2CID 1206768.
- Chow, Edmond (February 2015). "Parallel scalability of Hartree–Fock calculations". The Journal of Chemical Physics. 142 (10): 104103. Bibcode:2015JChPh.142j4103C. doi:10.1063/1.4913961. PMID 25770524.
- Pritchard, Benjamin P.; Chow, Edmond (2016-10-30). "Horizontal vectorization of electron repulsion integrals". Journal of Computational Chemistry. 37 (28): 2537–2546. doi:10.1002/jcc.24483. ISSN 1096-987X. PMID 27620865. S2CID 7353890.
- Ando, Tadashi; Chow, Edmond; Skolnick, Jeffrey (2013-09-28). "Dynamic simulation of concentrated macromolecular solutions with screened long-range hydrodynamic interactions: algorithm and limitations". The Journal of Chemical Physics. 139 (12): 121922. Bibcode:2013JChPh.139l1922A. doi:10.1063/1.4817660. ISSN 1089-7690. PMC 3758360. PMID 24089734.
- Ando, Tadashi; Chow, Edmond; Saad, Yousef; Skolnick, Jeffrey (2012-08-14). "Krylov subspace methods for computing hydrodynamic interactions in Brownian dynamics simulations" (PDF). The Journal of Chemical Physics. 137 (6): 064106. Bibcode:2012JChPh.137f4106A. doi:10.1063/1.4742347. ISSN 0021-9606. PMC 3427343. PMID 22897254.
- Levy, R.; Chow, E.; Kwon, B.; Socha, K.; McCarthy, M.; Turner, P. (2017-01-01). "SIAM Education Subcommittee Report on Undergraduate Degree Programs in Applied Mathematics". SIAM Review. 59 (1): 199–204. doi:10.1137/15M1008002. ISSN 0036-1445.
