= David Abramson =

Australian computer scientist

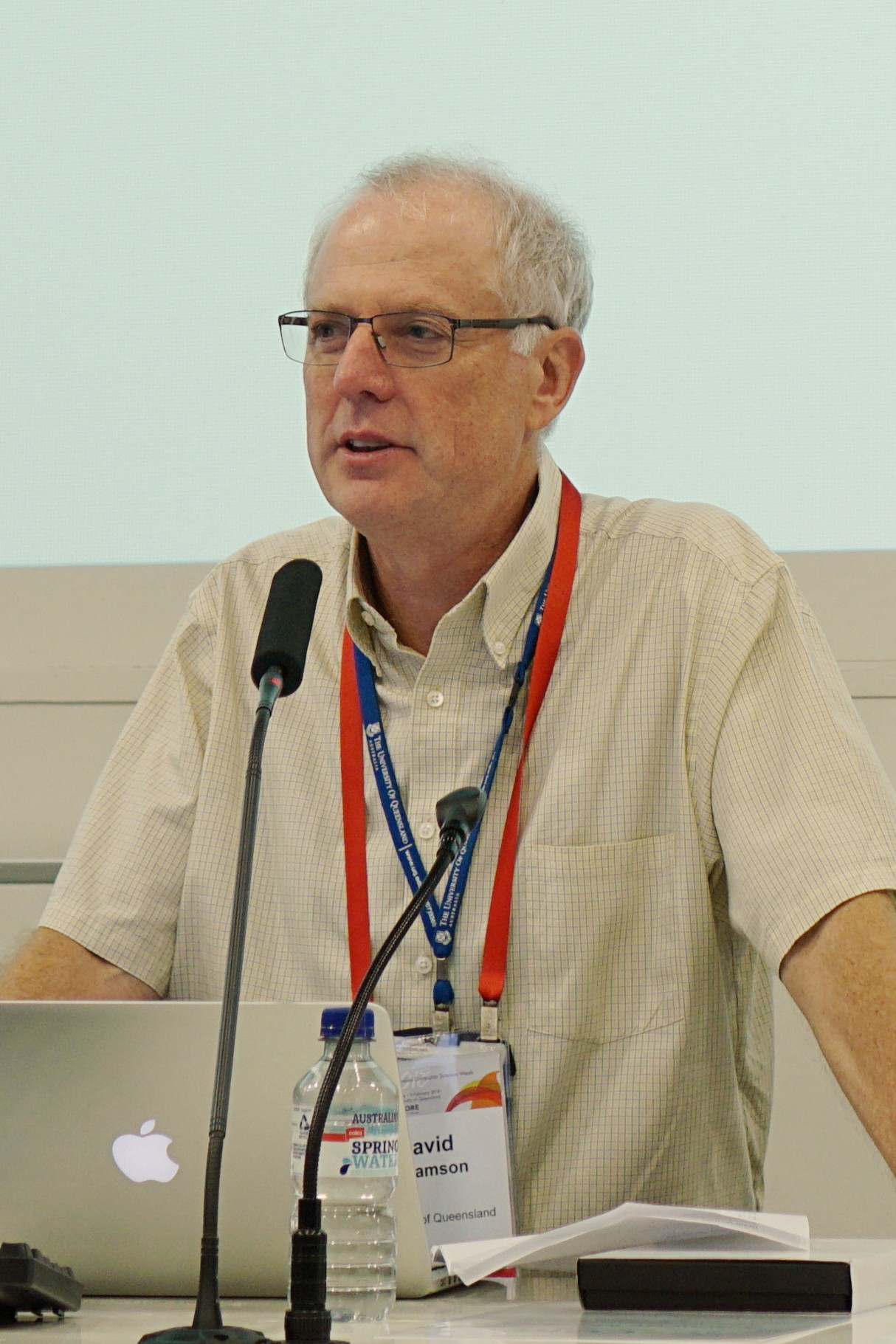
Abramson in 2018

David Abramson is an Australian computer scientist. He is currently an Emeritus Professor at the University of Queensland, Australia, since 2024. He has been involved in computer architecture and high performance computing research since 1979.

Abramson was elevated to Fellow of the Institute of Electrical and Electronics Engineers (IEEE) in 2016 for "contributions to software tools for high performance, parallel, and distributed computing".

In 2010 whilst Professor of Computer Science at Monash University, he was elected a Fellow of the Australian Academy of Technological Sciences and Engineering (FTSE). He is also a Fellow of the Association for Computing Machinery (FACM), and a Fellow of the Australian Computer Society (FACS).

Prior to being the Director of the Research Computing Centre at the University of Queensland between 2012 and 2024, he held positions at Monash University, Griffith University, CSIRO and RMIT.

Abramson has a Bachelor of Science (Honours), a Doctor of Philosophy, and a Doctor of Science, all from Monash University.

In 2019 the Pearcey Foundation elevated him to the Pearcey Hall of Fame and awarded him the 2019 Pearcey Medal.

In 2021, he was awarded the ACM/IEEE Ken Kennedy Award for "innovation in parallel and distributed computing tools with broad applications, as well as leadership contributions to professional service, creating international technical communities, and mentoring."
