= Ümit Çatalyürek =

Ümit V. Çatalyürek
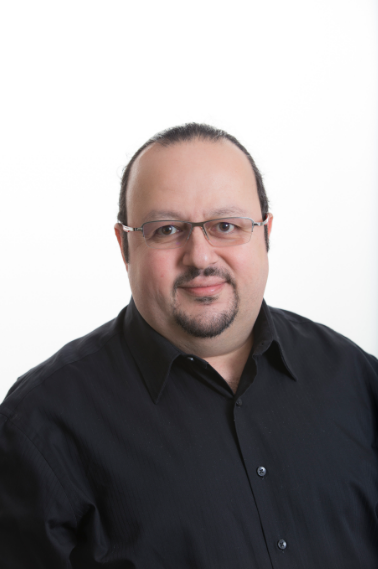
- Education: Bilkent University
- Known for: Graph and hypergraph partitioning, High performance computing, combinatorial scientific computing and biomedical informatics
- Spouse: Gamze Çatalyürek
- Awards: IEEE Fellow; SIAM Fellow; NSF CAREER; Lumley Interdisciplinary Research Award
- Scientific career
- Fields: Computer Science, Electrical & Computer Engineering, Biomedical Informatics
- Workplaces: Ohio State University; Georgia Institute of Technology
- Thesis: Hypergraph Models for Sparse Matrix Partitioning and Reordering
- Doctoral advisor: Cevdet Aykanat

Ümit V. Çatalyürek is a professor of computer science at the Georgia Institute of Technology, and adjunct professor in department of Biomedical Informatics at the Ohio State University. He is known for his work on graph analytics, parallel algorithms for scientific applications, data-intensive computing, and large scale genomic and biomedical applications. He was the director of the High Performance Computing Lab at the Ohio State University. He was named Fellow of the Institute of Electrical and Electronics Engineers (IEEE) in 2016 for contributions to combinatorial scientific computing and parallel computing.

== Education ==
Çatalyürek completed his B.S. in Computer Engineering and Information Science at the Bilkent University in the year 1992 and received his Ph.D. in Computer Engineering and Information Science from the Bilkent University in 2000, under the supervision of Cevdet Aykanat. His dissertation was published by the Bilkent University as Hypergraph Models for Sparse Matrix Partitioning and Reordering.

== Career ==
Çatalyürek began his career in 1992 as a research associate for Department of Computer Engineering and Information Science, Bilkent University, Turkey. He then joined as visiting research scientist at UMIACS, Research institute in College Park at the University of Maryland and research associate at Johns Hopkins Medical Institutions in 1999. Catalyurek later moved to Columbus to join The Ohio State University in 2001, as assistant professor, where he remained at this position until 2007 before promoted as associate professor in the department of Biomedical Informatics. He served different positions at The Ohio State University before joining as a professor at Georgia Institute of Technology in 2016, where he later became Associate Chair for Academic Programs at the Georgia Institute of Technology.

Çatalyürek is editor-in-chief of Elsevier's Parallel Computing journal. He also served as an editorial board member for IEEE Transactions on Parallel and Distributed Computing, the Journal of Parallel and Distributed Computing, and the SIAM Journal of Scientific Computing.

== Awards and honors ==
- Çatalyürek is an NSF CAREER Award recipient in 2007.
- Fellow, Institute of Electrical and Electronics Engineers (IEEE), "for contributions to combinatorial scientific computing and parallel computing." (2016).
- Fellow, Society for Industrial and applied mathematics (SIAM), "for contributions to high-performance and parallel algorithms and to combinatorial scientific computing." (2020)
- In 2015, he received The Ohio State University (OSU) Lumley Interdisciplinary Research Award.
- He was elected as chair for IEEE CS's Technical Committee on Parallel Processing in 2016–2017. He was also elected as Vice Chair for ACM ACM Special Interest Group on Bioinformatics, Computational Biology, and Biomedical Informatics in 2015–2017.

== Selected publications ==
Çatalyürek has co-authored over 200 articles in peer-reviewed journals and conferences.

- Catalyurek, U. V.; Aykanat, C. (July 1999). "Hypergraph-partitioning-based decomposition for parallel sparse-matrix vector multiplication". IEEE Transactions on Parallel and Distributed Systems. 10 (7): 673–693. doi:10.1109/71.780863. hdl:11693/25158. ISSN 1045-9219.
- Yoo, A.; Chow, E.; Henderson, K.; McLendon, W.; Hendrickson, B.; Catalyurek, U. (November 2005). "A Scalable Distributed Parallel Breadth-First Search Algorithm on BlueGene/L". ACM/IEEE SC 2005 Conference (SC'05). p. 25. doi:10.1109/SC.2005.4. ISBN 978-1-59593-061-3. S2CID 602651.
- Beynon, Michael D; Kurc, Tahsin; Catalyurek, Umit; Chang, Chialin; Sussman, Alan; Saltz, Joel (2001-10-01). "Distributed processing of very large datasets with DataCutter". Parallel Computing. Clusters and computational grids for scientific computing. 27 (11): 1457–1478. doi:10.1016/S0167-8191(01)00099-0.
- Devine, K. D.; Boman, E. G.; Heaphy, R. T.; Bisseling, R. H.; Catalyurek, U. V. (April 2006). "Parallel hypergraph partitioning for scientific computing". Proceedings 20th IEEE International Parallel & Distributed Processing Symposium. pp. 10 pp.–. doi:10.1109/IPDPS.2006.1639359. ISBN 978-1-4244-0054-6. S2CID 2444665.
- Sertel, O.; Kong, J.; Shimada, H.; Catalyurek, U. V.; Saltz, J. H.; Gurcan, M. N. (2009-06-01). "Computer-aided prognosis of neuroblastoma on whole-slide images: Classification of stromal development". Pattern Recognition. Digital Image Processing and Pattern Recognition Techniques for the Detection of Cancer. 42 (6): 1093–1103. Bibcode:2009PatRe..42.1093S. doi:10.1016/j.patcog.2008.08.027. PMC 2678741. PMID 20161324.
- Aykanat, C.; Pinar, A.; Çatalyürek, Ü. (2004-01-01). "Permuting Sparse Rectangular Matrices into Block-Diagonal Form". SIAM Journal on Scientific Computing. 25 (6): 1860–1879. Bibcode:2004SJSC...25.1860A. doi:10.1137/S1064827502401953. ISSN 1064-8275. S2CID 14535142.
- Sertel, Olcay; Kong, Jun; Catalyurek, Umit V.; Lozanski, Gerard; Saltz, Joel H.; Gurcan, Metin N. (2009-04-01). "Histopathological Image Analysis Using Model-Based Intermediate Representations and Color Texture: Follicular Lymphoma Grading". Journal of Signal Processing Systems. 55 (1–3): 169. doi:10.1007/s11265-008-0201-y. ISSN 1939-8018. S2CID 207252800.
- Hatem, Ayat; Bozdağ, Doruk; Toland, Amanda E.; Çatalyürek, Ümit V. (2013-06-07). "Benchmarking short sequence mapping tools". BMC Bioinformatics. 14: 184. doi:10.1186/1471-2105-14-184. ISSN 1471-2105. PMC 3694458. PMID 23758764.
- Eren, K.; Deveci, M.; Kucuktunc, O.; Catalyurek, U. V. (2013-05-01). "A comparative analysis of biclustering algorithms for gene expression data". Briefings in Bioinformatics. 14 (3): 279–292. doi:10.1093/bib/bbs032. ISSN 1467-5463. PMC 3659300. PMID 22772837.
