= Sony Toshiba IBM Center of Competence for the Cell Processor =

Microprocessor research center

The Sony Toshiba IBM Center of Competence for the Cell Processor is the first Center of Competence dedicated to the promotion and development of Sony Toshiba IBM's Cell microprocessor, an eight-core multiprocessor designed using principles of parallelism and memory latency. The center is part of the Georgia Institute of Technology's College of Computing and is headed by David A. Bader.

According to IBM, the center is intended "to build a community of programmers and broaden industry support for the Cell BE processor." So far, the program has resulted in two workshops that involved detailed lectures on and training with various basic cell programming concepts, and has deployed a cluster of 28 IBM BladeCenter QS20 Servers (14 blades) for student and faculty use.
