= Richard M. Fujimoto =

Computer scientist

Richard Masao Fujimoto
- Education: University of Illinois, Urbana; University of California, Berkeley
- Known for: Parallel and distributed discrete event simulation
- Awards: IEEE Fellow, ACM Fellow, I/ITSEC Fellow
- Scientific career
- Fields: Reverse computation; Distributed computing; Big data
- Workplaces: Georgia Tech, School of Computational Science and Engineering

Richard Masao Fujimoto is a computer scientist and researcher in reverse computation, distributed computing, and big data. He is a Regents’ Professor, Emeritus, in the School of Computational Science and Engineering (CSE) at the Georgia Institute of Technology. He was also the founding chair of Georgia Tech's school of CSE. Fujimoto's research has provided the basis for the development of new algorithms and computational techniques for discrete event simulations, including the development of the Georgia Tech Time Warp software, which was adopted for use by MITRE to create a commercial air traffic simulator. Fujimoto also led the development and definition of the time management services in the High Level Architecture (HLA) for modeling and simulation which was standardized under IEEE 1516.

== Selected awards ==
- IEEE Fellow, 2020, "For his work in the field of parallel and distributed discrete event simulation"
- I/ITSEC Fellow, 2019
- ACM Fellow, 2017, "For achievements in modeling and simulations"
