= Karen Devine =

American computer scientist

Karen Dragon Devine is an American computer scientist specializing in high-performance technical computing. She is a Distinguished Member of the Technical Staff in the Center for Computing Research at Sandia National Laboratories. At Sandia, she is part of the development team for the Zoltan and Trilinos scientific computing packages.

== Education ==
Devine is a 1987 graduate of Wilkes College. She earned her Ph.D. in 1994 from Rensselaer Polytechnic Institute with Joseph E. Flaherty as her doctoral advisor. Her dissertation was An Adaptive HP-Finite Element Method with Dynamic Load Balancing for the Solution of Hyperbolic Conservation Laws on Massively Parallel Computers.

== Recognition ==
In 1999, Wilkes University gave Devine their Distinguished Young Alumni Award. In 2018 she was elected chair of the Activity Group on Computational Science and Engineering (SIAG/CSE) of the Society for Industrial and Applied Mathematics.
