= Richard Vuduc =

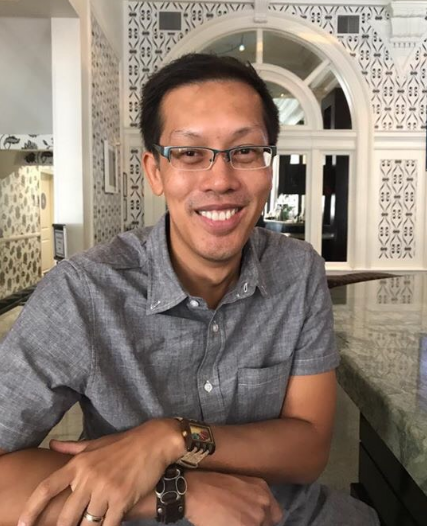
- Awards: NSF career award, Gordon Bell Prize

Academic background
- Education: Cornell University, University of California-Berkeley

Academic work
- Discipline: High-performance computing, Scientific computing, Parallel algorithms, and Performance analysis, modeling, and engineering.
- Institutions: Georgia Institute of Technology School of Computational Science & Engineering

Richard Vuduc is a tenured professor of computer science at the Georgia Institute of Technology. His research lab, The HPC Garage, studies high-performance computing, scientific computing, parallel algorithms, modeling, and engineering. He is a member of the Association for Computing Machinery (ACM). As of 2022, Vuduc serves as Vice President of the SIAM Activity Group on Supercomputing. He has co-authored over 200 articles in peer-reviewed journals and conferences.

== Education ==
Dr. Vuduc received his Ph.D. in computer science from the University of California, Berkeley, in 2004. He received his B.S in computer science at Cornell University in 1997. He is also an alumnus of the Thomas Jefferson High School for Science and Technology in Alexandria, Virginia.

== Academic career ==
Vuduc was a Postdoctoral Scholar in the Center for Advanced Scientific Computing at the Lawrence Livermore National Laboratory. He has served as an associate editor of both the International Journal of High-Performance Computing Applications and IEEE Transactions on Parallel and Distributed Systems. He co-chaired the Technical Papers Program of the “Supercomputing” (SC) Conference in 2016 and was later elected to be Vice President of the SIAM Activity Group on Supercomputing from 2016 to 2018. He also served as department's Associate Chair and Director of its graduate (MS & Ph.D.) programs from 2013 to 2016.

== Major honors and awards ==
- Member of the DARPA Computer Science Study Group
- Recipient NSF CAREER award
- Collaborative Gordon Bell Prize 2010
- Lockheed-Martin Aeronautics Company Dean's Award for Teaching Excellence 2013
- Best Paper Awards, including the SIAM Conference on Data Mining (SDM, 2012) and IEEE Parallel and Distributed Processing Symposium (IPDPS, 2015)

== Major publications ==
- Williams, Samuel; Oliker, Leonid; Vuduc, Richard; Shalf, John; Yelick, Katherine; Demmel, James (2007). "Optimization of sparse matrix-vector multiplication on emerging multicore platforms". Proceedings of the 2007 ACM/IEEE conference on Supercomputing - SC '07. p. 1. doi:10.1145/1362622.1362674. ISBN 9781595937643. OSTI 1407083. S2CID 1845814.
- Vuduc, Richard; Demmel, James W.; Yelick, Katherine A. (2005). "OSKI: A library of automatically tuned sparse matrix kernels". Journal of Physics: Conference Series. 16 (1): 521. Bibcode:2005JPhCS..16..521V. doi:10.1088/1742-6596/16/1/071. ISSN 1742-6596.
- Vuduc, Richard (Rich). "Model-driven autotuning of sparse matrix-vector multiply on GPUs". ACM SIGPLAN Notices.
- Im, Eun-Jin; Yelick, Katherine; Vuduc, Richard (February 2004). "Sparsity: Optimization Framework for Sparse Matrix Kernels". Int. J. High Perform. Comput. Appl. 18 (1): 135–158. CiteSeerX 10.1.1.137.5844. doi:10.1177/1094342004041296. ISSN 1094-3420. S2CID 2447843.
- Vuduc, Richard Wilson (2003). Automatic Performance Tuning of Sparse Matrix Kernels (Thesis). University of California, Berkeley.
- Demmel, J.; Dongarra, J.; Eijkhout, V.; Fuentes, E.; Petitet, A.; Vuduc, R.; Whaley, R. C.; Yelick, K. (February 2005). "Self-Adapting Linear Algebra Algorithms and Software". Proceedings of the IEEE. 93 (2): 293–312. CiteSeerX 10.1.1.108.7568. doi:10.1109/JPROC.2004.840848. ISSN 0018-9219. S2CID 3065125.
- Vuduc, Richard; Demmel, James W.; Yelick, Katherine A.; Kamil, Shoaib; Nishtala, Rajesh; Lee, Benjamin (2002). "Performance Optimizations and Bounds for Sparse Matrix-vector Multiply". Proceedings of the 2002 ACM/IEEE Conference on Supercomputing. SC '02. Los Alamitos, CA, USA: IEEE Computer Society Press. pp. 1–35.
- Lashuk, Ilya; Chandramowlishwaran, Aparna; Langston, Harper; Nguyen, Tuan-Anh; Sampath, Rahul; Shringarpure, Aashay; Vuduc, Richard; Ying, Lexing; Zorin, Denis (May 2012). "A Massively Parallel Adaptive Fast Multipole Method on Heterogeneous Architectures". Communications of the ACM. 55 (5): 101–109. doi:10.1145/2160718.2160740. ISSN 0001-0782. S2CID 2272736.
- Rahimian, Abtin; Lashuk, Ilya; Veerapaneni, Shravan; Chandramowlishwaran, Aparna; Malhotra, Dhairya; Moon, Logan; Sampath, Rahul; Shringarpure, Aashay; Vetter, Jeffrey; Vuduc, Richard; Zorin, Denis; Biros, George (2010). "Petascale Direct Numerical Simulation of Blood Flow on 200K Cores and Heterogeneous Architectures". 2010 ACM/IEEE International Conference for High Performance Computing, Networking, Storage and Analysis. pp. 1–11. doi:10.1109/SC.2010.42. ISBN 9781424475599. S2CID 5490197.
- Sim, Jaewoong; Dasgupta, Aniruddha; Kim, Hyesoon; Vuduc, Richard (2012). "A performance analysis framework for identifying potential benefits in GPGPU applications". Proceedings of the 17th ACM SIGPLAN symposium on Principles and Practice of Parallel Programming - PPoPP '12. p. 11. CiteSeerX 10.1.1.226.3542. doi:10.1145/2145816.2145819. ISBN 9781450311601. S2CID 6817445.
- Vuduc, Richard; Chandramowlishwaran, Aparna; Choi, Jee; Guney, Murat; Shringarpure, Aashay (2010). "On the Limits of GPU Acceleration". Proceedings of the 2nd USENIX Conference on Hot Topics in Parallelism. HotPar'10. Berkeley, CA, USA: USENIX Association. p. 13.
- Vuduc, Richard W.; Moon, Hyun-Jin (2005). "Fast Sparse Matrix-Vector Multiplication by Exploiting Variable Block Structure". High Performance Computing and Communications. Lecture Notes in Computer Science. Vol. 3726. Berlin, Heidelberg: Springer-Verlag. pp. 807–816. doi:10.1007/11557654_91. ISBN 978-3540290315.
- Park, Sangmin; Vuduc, Richard W.; Harrold, Mary Jean (2010). "Falcon". Proceedings of the 32nd ACM/IEEE International Conference on Software Engineering - ICSE '10. Vol. 1. p. 245. doi:10.1145/1806799.1806838. ISBN 9781605587196. S2CID 8744239.
- Vuduc, Richard; Demmel, James W.; Bilmes, Jeff A. (February 2004). "Statistical Models for Empirical Search-Based Performance Tuning". The International Journal of High Performance Computing Applications. 18 (1): 65–94. CiteSeerX 10.1.1.64.5699. doi:10.1177/1094342004041293. ISSN 1094-3420. S2CID 2563412.
- Qing, Yi; Keith, Seymour; Haihang, You; Richard, Vuduc; Dan, Quinlan. "POET: Parameterized Optimizations for Empirical Tuning". 2007 IEEE International Parallel and Distributed Processing Symposium.
- Chandramowlishwaran, A.; Knobe, K.; Vuduc, R. (April 2010). "Performance evaluation of concurrent collections on high-performance multicore computing systems". 2010 IEEE International Symposium on Parallel & Distributed Processing (IPDPS). pp. 1–12. CiteSeerX 10.1.1.169.5643. doi:10.1109/IPDPS.2010.5470404. ISBN 978-1-4244-6442-5. S2CID 1133093.
