= Francine Berman =

American computer scientist

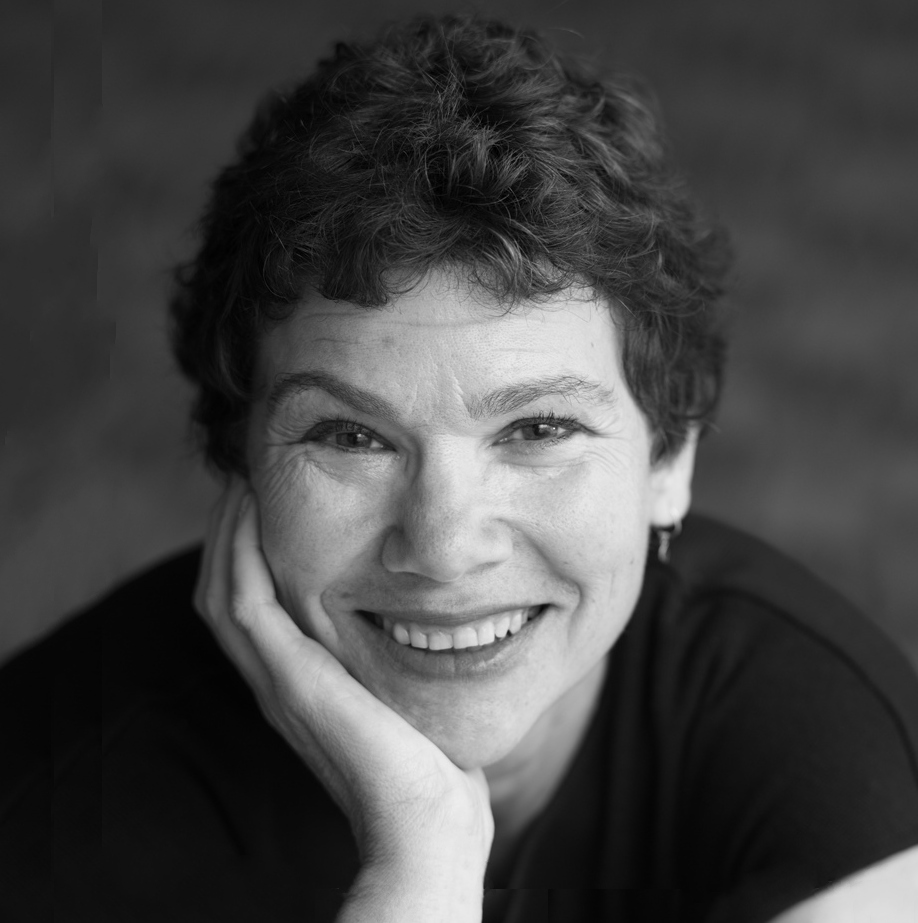
- Born: February 7, 1951 (age 75); Glendale, California, U.S.
- Education: University of Washington (BA, MS, PhD)
- Known for: Cyberinfrastructure, Supercomputer
- Awards: Ken Kennedy Award, 2009; Digital Preservation Pioneer (National Library of Congress)
- Scientific career
- Fields: Computer Science
- Workplaces: Rensselaer Polytechnic Institute, University of California, San Diego, Purdue University, University of Massachusetts, Amherst

Francine Berman (born February 7, 1951) is an American computer scientist, and a leader in digital data preservation and cyber-infrastructure. In 2009, she was the inaugural recipient of the IEEE/ACM-CS Ken Kennedy Award "for her influential leadership in the design, development and deployment of national-scale cyberinfrastructure, her inspiring work as a teacher and mentor, and her exemplary service to the high performance community". In 2004, Business Week called her the "reigning teraflop queen".

Berman is the former director of the San Diego Supercomputer Center (SDSC), and High Performance Computing Endowed Chair and a former professor of computer science and engineering at the University of California, San Diego (UCSD). Since 2009, she has served as vice president for research and professor of computer science at Rensselaer Polytechnic Institute (RPI). In 2011, Berman was appointed co-chair of the National Academies Board on Research Data and Information (BRDI). In August 2021, Berman joined the University of Massachusetts, Amherst to establish a program in public interest technology. Berman is a Fellow of the National Academy of Public Administration (United States).

== Early life and education ==
Francine Berman was born in Glendale, California. She graduated from the University of California, Los Angeles (UCLA) with a B.A. in mathematics (1973), and from the University of Washington with an M.S. and a Ph.D. in mathematics (1976, 1979). Her Ph.D. thesis investigated non-standard models of propositional dynamic logic, an area in the field of theoretical computer science.

== Career ==
Berman began her professional career as assistant professor in the Computer Science Department at Purdue University in Lafayette, Indiana. In 1984, Berman left Purdue to join the Computer Science and Engineering Department at UCSD as assistant, and then associate and full professor. In 2002, she was awarded the Endowed Chair in High Performance Computing in the Jacobs School of Engineering at UCSD.

In 1999, while at UCSD, Berman founded the Grid Computing Laboratory. Research in the Grid Lab targeted applications and software environments within parallel, high performance computing, and grid environments. The lab was known for the innovative AppLeS project, which explored the development of adaptive applications that could opportunistically self-schedule in distributed environments based on ambient load and performance projections.

In 2001, Berman was appointed director of the San Diego Supercomputer Center (SDSC), a lead center for the National Science Foundation's National Partnership for Advanced Computational Infrastructure (NPACI), as well as Director of NPACI itself. NPACI was a consortium of over 40 institutions whose mission was to develop national-scale cyberinfrastructure and provide supercomputing facilities to the U.S. research community. As lead institution, SDSC hosted national supercomputer facilities and collaborated widely to develop computational applications and cyberinfrastructure. Also in 2001, Berman partnered with Dan Reed, Director of the National Center for Supercomputing Applications, to launch the NSF-sponsored TeraGrid.

From 2001 to 2009, Berman served as SDSC's director and led an organization of several hundred researchers, scientists, and systems staff. During this time, SDSC strengthened its focus on data-intensive science, data stewardship, and data cyberinfrastructure, developed collaborations with major national and international cyberinfrastructure projects, and developed an innovative data stewardship partnership with the UCSD Libraries. Under Berman's leadership, SDSC was considered "one of the leaders, if not the leader in the country, in dealing with massive amounts of data".

In 2007, Berman became co-chair of the ‘’Blue Ribbon Task Force on Sustainable Digital Preservation and Access’’. Supported by the National Science Foundation, Library of Congress, Mellon Foundation, U.K. Joint Information Systems Committee, Council on Library and Information Resources, and other organizations, the Blue Ribbon Task Force was charged to conduct a “deep dive” investigation into the economics of digital access and preservation. The Blue Ribbon Task Force released two reports: in 2008, and early 2010. These reports assessed the landscape for economic support of digital information, provided a set of recommendations addressing the development of sustainable strategies for preservation and access, and suggested a research agenda to drive further work. The Blue Ribbon Task Force reports have currently been downloaded over 120,000 times from the Task Force website.

In 2009, Berman became vice president for research at Rensselaer Polytechnic Institute (2009–2012). In 2012, she became U.S. lead of the Research Data Alliance (RDA) and the Edward P. Hamilton Distinguished Professor in Computer Science at Rensselaer Polytechnic Institute.

== Awards and honors ==
In 2009, Berman was honored as the inaugural recipient of the IEEE/ACM-CS Ken Kennedy Award. She has also been elected a Fellow of the ACM (2009), a Fellow of the IEEE (2011), and 2013 Chair of the Information, Computing and Communication Section (Section T) of the American Association for the Advancement of Science (AAAS). In 2011 Berman was appointed co-chair of the National Academies Board on Research Data and Information. Berman has been designated a “Digital Preservation Pioneer” by the Library of Congress, and served as a 2009 ACM Distinguished Lecturer. She has authored over 100 journal articles, refereed conference papers, book chapters and other publications. She is the co-editor of ‘’Grid Computing: Making the Global Infrastructure a Reality’’ with Tony Hey and Geoffrey Fox. She was elected to the American Academy of Arts and Sciences in 2019.

== Outreach ==
Throughout her career, Berman has been involved with national efforts to recruit, retain and advance women in STEM (science, technology, engineering and math) fields, and in particular, computer science. A founding member of the Computing Research Association Committee on the Status of Women (CRA-W), she served as CRA-W co-chair from 1993 to 1996. Berman served as the Chair of the board of trustees of the Anita Borg Institute. She has been a keynote speaker at the Grace Hopper Celebration of Women in Computing and speaks frequently on data preservation and cyberinfrastructure, women in science and technology, and other topics.

== Affiliations ==
- Anita Borg Institute (Board of Trustees Board Chair)
- Rensselaer Polytechnic Institute (Vice President for Research and Professor of Computer Science)
