= James Demmel =

American mathematician

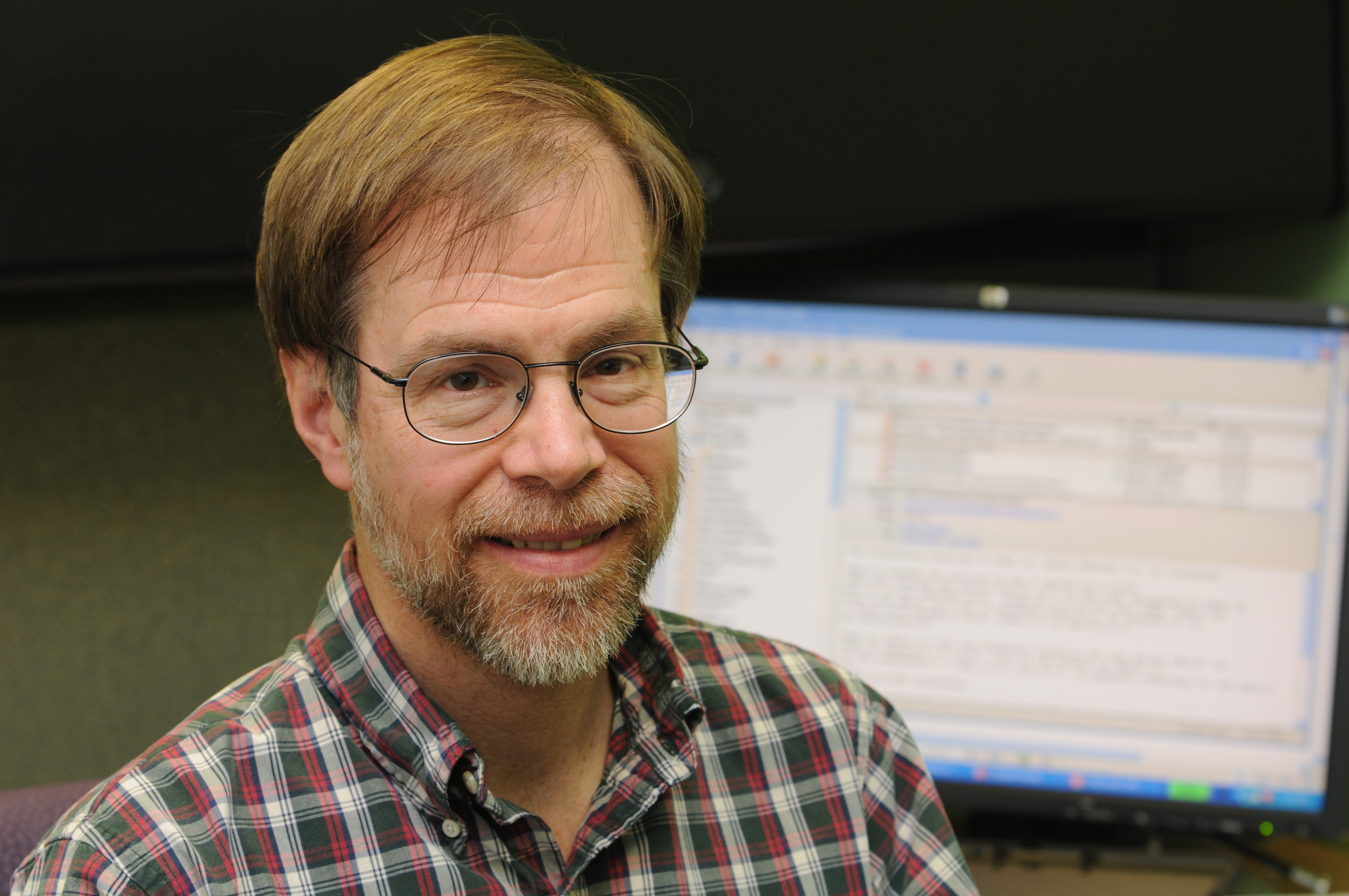
- Born: James Weldon Demmel Jr. October 19, 1955 (age 71); Pittsburgh, Pennsylvania, U.S.
- Education: California Institute of Technology (B.S.,1975); University of California, Berkeley (PhD.,1983)
- Known for: LAPACK
- Spouse: Katherine Yelick
- Awards: ACM Fellow (1999)
- Scientific career
- Fields: mathematician computer scientist
- Workplaces: University of California, Berkeley
- Thesis: A Numerical Analyst's Jordan Canonical Form (1983)
- Doctoral advisor: William Kahan
- Doctoral students: Sherry Li
- Website: https://www.cs.berkeley.edu/~demmel/

James Weldon Demmel Jr. (born October 19, 1955) is an American mathematician and computer scientist, the Dr. Richard Carl Dehmel Distinguished Professor of Mathematics and Computer Science at the University of California, Berkeley.

In 1999, Demmel was elected a member of the National Academy of Engineering for contributions to numerical linear algebra and scientific computing.

== Biography ==
Born in Pittsburgh, Demmel did his undergraduate studies at the California Institute of Technology, graduating in 1975 with a B.S. in mathematics. He earned his Ph.D. in computer science in 1983 from UC Berkeley, under the supervision of William Kahan; his dissertation was entitled A Numerical Analyst's Jordan Canonical Form. After holding a faculty position at New York University for six years, he moved to Berkeley in 1990.

== Academic works ==
Demmel is known for his work on LAPACK, a software library for numerical linear algebra and more generally for research in numerical algorithms combining mathematical rigor with high performance implementation. Prometheus, a parallel multigrid finite element solver written by Demmel, Mark Adams, and Robert Taylor, won the Carl Benz Award at Supercomputing 1999 and the Gordon Bell Prize for Adams and his coworkers at Supercomputing 2004.

== Honors and awards ==
Demmel was elected as a member of the National Academy of Engineering in 1999, a fellow of the Association for Computing Machinery in 1999, a fellow of the IEEE in 2001, a fellow of SIAM in 2009, and a member of the United States National Academy of Sciences in 2011. Demmel was one of two scientists honored in 1986 with the Leslie Fox Prize for Numerical Analysis. In 1993, Demmel won the J.H. Wilkinson Prize in Numerical Analysis and Scientific Computing, and in 2010, he was the winner of the IEEE's Sidney Fernbach Award "for computational science leadership in creating adaptive, innovative, high-performance linear algebra software". In 2012 he became a fellow of the American Mathematical Society. He received the IEEE Computer Society Charles Babbage Award in 2013.

== Personal life ==
Demmel is married to Katherine Yelick, who is also an ACM Fellow and professor of electrical engineering and computer science at UC Berkeley, and the director of Lawrence Berkeley National Laboratory.
