= International Conference on High Performance Computing =

The International Conference on High Performance Computing (or HiPC) is an international meeting on high performance computing. It serves as a forum to present current work by researchers from around the world as well as highlight activities in Asia in the high performance computing area. The meeting focuses on all aspects of high performance computing systems and their scientific, engineering, and commercial applications.
