= International Parallel and Distributed Processing Symposium =

The International Parallel and Distributed Processing Symposium (or IPDPS) is an annual conference for engineers and scientists to present recent findings in the fields of parallel processing and distributed computing. In addition to technical sessions of submitted paper presentations, the meeting offers workshops, tutorials, and commercial presentations & exhibits. IPDPS is sponsored by the IEEE Computer Society's Technical Committee on Parallel Processing.

IPDPS is a week-long symposium that typically includes three days of a main track, two days of about 20 workshops bookending the main track, one or more tutorials, a panel, several keynote talks, and a banquet. The main track consists of high-quality, peer-reviewed papers representing original unpublished research in all areas of parallel and distributed processing, including the development of experimental or commercial systems. IPDPS topics of interest include, but are not limited to:

- Parallel and distributed algorithms, focusing on issues such as: stability, scalability, and fault tolerance of distributed systems, communication and synchronization protocols, network algorithms, and scheduling and load balancing.
- Applications of parallel and distributed computing, including web applications, peer-to-peer computing, grid computing, scientific applications, and mobile computing.
- Parallel and distributed architectures, including shared memory, distributed memory (including petascale system designs, and architectures with instruction-level and thread-level parallelism), special-purpose models (including signal and image processors, network processors, other special purpose processors), nontraditional processor technologies, network and interconnect architecture, parallel I/O and storage systems, system design issues for low power, design for high reliability, and performance modeling and evaluation.
- Parallel and distributed software, including parallel programming languages and compilers, runtime systems, operating systems, resource management, middleware, libraries, data mining, and programming environments and tools.

== Conference history ==
The conference began in 1987 as the Orange County Parallel Processing Conference, before being renamed as the International Parallel Processing Symposium (IPPS). In 1998, the Symposium on Parallel and Distributed Systems (SPDP) merged with IPPS; and in 2000, the conference took the now familiar name: International Parallel and Distributed Processing Symposium (IPDPS). Five of the original volunteer organizers have served the conference for over two decades: Viktor Prasanna, George Westrom, Sally Jelinek Westrom, Susamma Barua, and Bill Pitts.

- 1987 - Fullerton, California, USA
- 1988 - Fullerton, California, USA
- 1989 - Fullerton, California, USA
- 1990 - Fullerton, California, USA
- 1991 - Anaheim, California, USA
- 1992 - Beverly Hills, California, USA
- 1993 - Newport Beach, California, USA
- 1994 - Cancún, Mexico
- 1995 - Santa Barbara, California, USA
- 1996 - Honolulu, Hawaii, USA
- 1997 - Geneva, Switzerland
- 1998 - Orlando, Florida, USA
- 1999 - San Juan, Puerto Rico
- 2000 - Cancún, Mexico
- 2001 - San Francisco, California, USA
- 2002 - Fort Lauderdale, Florida, USA
- 2003 - Nice, France
- 2004 - Santa Fe, New Mexico, USA
- 2005 - Denver, Colorado, USA
- 2006 - Rhodes Island, Greece
- 2007 - Long Beach, California, USA
- 2008 - Miami, Florida, USA
- 2009 - Rome, Italy
- 2010 - Atlanta, Georgia, USA
- 2011 - Anchorage, Alaska, USA
- 2012 - Shanghai, China
- 2013 - Cambridge, Massachusetts, USA
- 2014 - Phoenix, Arizona, USA
- 2015 - Hyderabad, India
- 2016 - Chicago, Illinois, USA
- 2017 - Orlando, Florida, USA
- 2018 - Vancouver, British Columbia, Canada
- 2019 - Rio de Janeiro, Brazil
- 2020 - New Orleans, USA [virtual]
- 2021 - Portland, USA [virtual]
- 2022 - Lyon, France
- 2023 - St. Petersburg, Florida, USA
- 2024 - San Francisco, California, USA
- 2025 - Milan, Italy
- 2026 - New Orleans, Louisiana, USA

== IEEE Computer Society Charles Babbage Award ==
In 1989, the conference established the IEEE Computer Society Charles Babbage Award to be given each year to a conference participant in recognition of exceptional contributions to the field. The recipient of the award is invited to give a keynote talk each year at the conference.

== See also ==
- List of distributed computing conferences
