= Google data centers =

Facilities containing Google servers

External videos
- YouTube
- Google Data Center 360° Tour

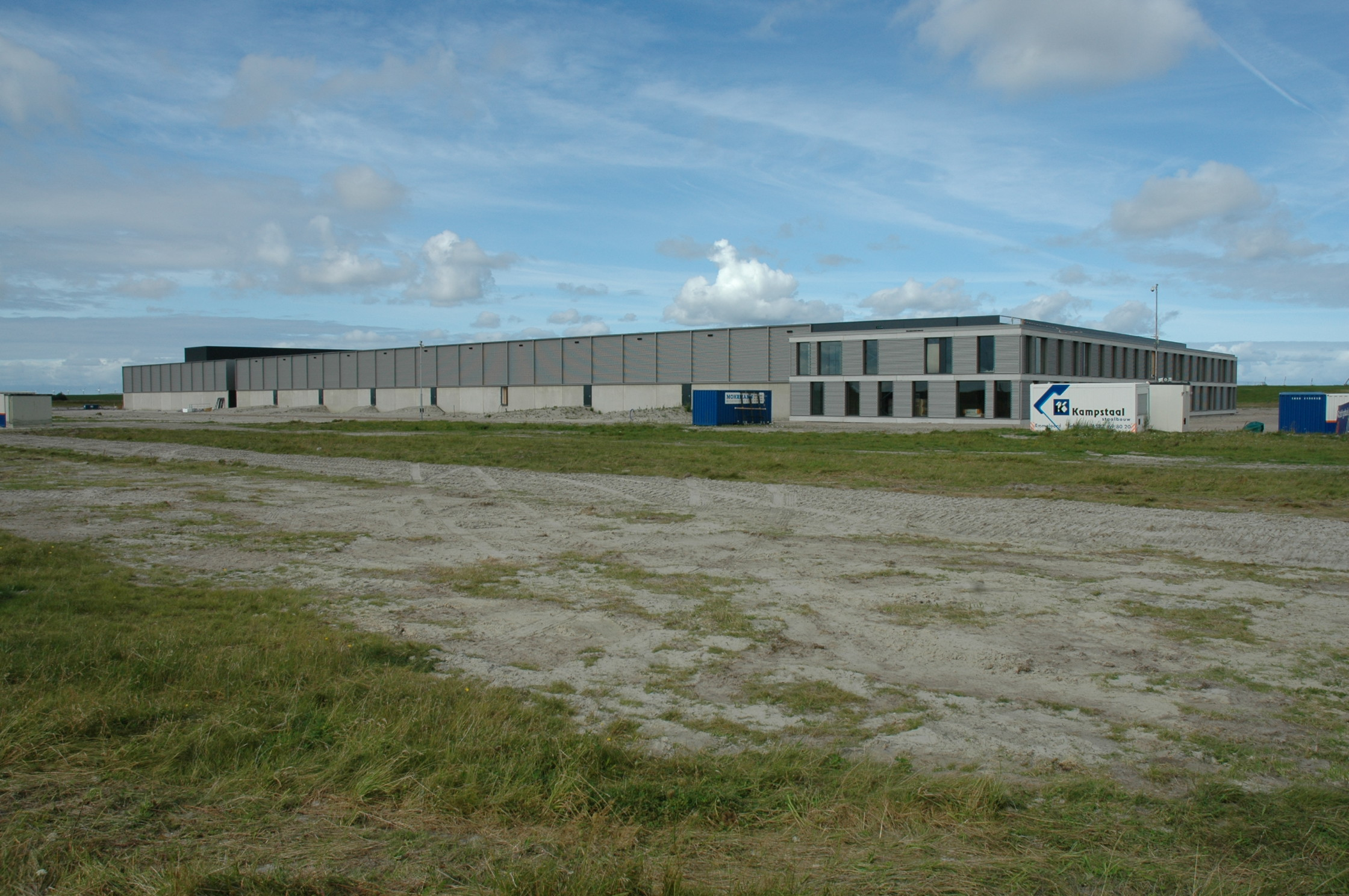
Google data center in Eemshaven, Netherlands

Google uses large data center facilities to provide their services, which combine large drives, computer nodes organized in aisles of racks, internal and external networking, environmental controls (mainly cooling and humidification control), and operations software (especially as concerns load balancing and fault tolerance).

There is no official data on how many servers are in Google data centers, but Gartner estimated in a July 2016 report that Google at the time had 2.5 million servers. This number is changing as the company expands capacity and refreshes its hardware.

Originally designed in the early 2000s around clusters of commodity personal computers to serve Google Search, the facilities have since evolved into hyperscale campuses powering Google Cloud Platform (GCP), YouTube, and artificial intelligence (AI) workloads. Modern sites integrate custom-designed Tensor Processing Unit (TPU) accelerators, Arm-based CPUs, and optical circuit switching fabrics, operating at a fleet-wide average power usage effectiveness (PUE) of 1.09 as of 2025.

== Locations ==
Google's infrastructure comprises both company-owned hyperscale data center campuses (which support consumer products such as Search, YouTube, and Gemini) and Google Cloud Platform (GCP) regions (which include both Google-owned campuses and leased colocation facilities).

Google data center campuses and Cloud regions
Continent	Location	Geo	Products Location	Cloud Location	Timeline	Description
North America	Arcola (VA), USA	38°56′35.99″N 77°31′27.61″W	Loudoun County	N. Virginia (us-east4)	2017 - announced 2019 - launched	
North America	Armstrong County (TX), USA		Armstrong County	-	2025 - announced	Part of US$40B Texas investment through 2027
Europe	Athens, Greece		-	Athens	2022 - announced	
North America	Atlanta / Lithia Springs (GA), USA	33°44′59.04″N 84°35′5.33″W	Douglas County	-	2003 - launched	350 employees
Pacific	Auckland, New Zealand		-	Auckland	2022 - announced	
Asia	Bangkok, Thailand		-	Bangkok (asia-southeast3)	2022 - announced 2026 January - launched	
Europe	Berlin, Germany		-	Berlin (europe-west10)	2021 - announced 2023 August - launched	
North America	Botetourt County (VA), USA		Botetourt County	-	2025 June - announced 2026 - grading started	312 acres at Botetourt Center at Greenfield; air-cooled design
South America	Canelones, Uruguay	34°48′56″S 55°59′44″W	Canelones	-	2024 - construction started 2026 - inauguration expected	Parque de las Ciencias (Nicolich)
North America	Cedar Rapids (IA), USA	41°58′40″N 91°39′56″W	Cedar Rapids	-	2025 - announced	Part of US$7B Iowa expansion
South America	Cerrillos, Santiago, Chile	33°31′14″S 70°43′18″W	-	Santiago (southamerica-west1)	2020 - announced 2021 - launched	
Asia	Changhua County, Taiwan	24°08′18.6″N 120°25′32.6″E	Changhua County	Taiwan (asia-east1)	2011 - announced 2013 - launched	60 employees
North America	Chesterfield County (VA), USA	37°22′02″N 77°36′28″W	Chesterfield County	-	2025 - announced	Part of US$9B Virginia cloud and AI infrastructure expansion
Asia	Chonburi, Thailand		Chonburi	-	2024 - announced	In development
North America	Clarksville (TN), USA	36°37′16″N 87°15′47″W	Montgomery County	-	2015 - announced 2019 - launched	
North America	Columbia County / Appling (GA), USA	33°33′00″N 82°15′36″W	Columbia County	-	2026 - announced	White Oak Technology Park (in development)
North America	Columbus (OH), USA		Columbus	Columbus (us-east5)	2022 - launched	
North America	Council Bluffs (IA), USA	41°13′17.7″N 95°51′49.92″W	Council Bluffs	Iowa (us-central1)	2007 - announced 2009 - first phase completed 2012, 2015, 2025 - expanded	130+ employees across multiple campus sites (41°10′06″N 95°47′46″W)
Middle East	Dammam, Saudi Arabia		-	Dammam (me-central2)	2021 - announced 2023 - launched	
Asia	Delhi, India		-	Delhi (asia-south2)	2020 - announced 2021 - launched	
Europe	Dietzenbach, Germany	50°01′02″N 8°47′13″E	Dietzenbach	Frankfurt (europe-west3)	2025 - announced	In development
Middle East	Doha, Qatar		-	Doha (me-central1)	2023 - launched	
North America	Dorchester County (SC), USA	33°10′05″N 80°32′38″W	Dorchester County	South Carolina (us-east1)	2024 - launched	Second South Carolina data center campus
Europe	Dublin, Ireland	53°19′12.39″N 6°26′31.43″W	Dublin	-	2011 - announced 2012 - launched 2014 - second building announced	150 employees
Europe	Eemshaven, Netherlands	53.4252171°N 6.8622574°E	Eemshaven	Netherlands (europe-west4)	2014 - announced 2016 - launched 2018, 2019 - expansion	200 employees
Europe	Farciennes, Hainaut, Belgium		Farciennes	Belgium (europe-west1)	2024 - announced	In development; part of €5B Belgian expansion
North America	Fort Wayne (IN), USA	41°01′59.4″N 85°03′22.6″W	Indiana	—	October 2023: Introduced as "Project Zodiac"; January 2024: Google Announced Connection to Project; April 26, 2024: Groundbreaking; December 2025: Operational (First-phase); August 2026: Construction Ongoing	728 acres; $2B investment
Europe	Frankfurt / Hanau, Germany	50°07′21″N 8°58′27″E	Hanau	Frankfurt (europe-west3)	2017 - cloud region launched 2022 - expanded 2023 - Hanau campus opened	
Europe	Fredericia, Denmark	55°33′29.5″N 9°39′20.8″E	Fredericia	-	2018 - announced 2020 - launched	€600M building costs
Europe	Ghlin (Saint-Ghislain), Hainaut, Belgium	50°28′09.6″N 3°51′55.7″E	Saint-Ghislain	Belgium (europe-west1)	2007 - announced 2010 - launched 2015, 2025 - expanded	Google's first data center outside the US; over €5B invested in Belgium
Europe	Groningen, Netherlands		Groningen	Netherlands (europe-west4)	2024 - announced	In development
Europe	Hamina, Finland	60°32′11.68″N 27°7′1.21″E	Hamina	Finland (europe-north1)	2009 - announced 2011 - first phase completed 2022, 2026 - expanded	6 buildings, 400 employees; offsite heat recovery provides 80% of local district heating
North America	Haskell County (TX), USA		Haskell County	-	2025 - announced	Part of US$40B Texas investment through 2027
North America	Henderson (NV), USA	36°03′20″N 115°00′37″W	Henderson	Las Vegas (us-west4)	2019 - announced 2020 - launched	64-acres; $1.2B building costs
Asia	Hong Kong, Hong Kong		-	Hong Kong (asia-east2)	2017 - announced 2018 - launched	
Europe	Horndal (Avesta), Sweden		Horndal	Stockholm (europe-north2)	2022 - region announced 2026 June - groundbreaking	Air-cooled facility with off-site heat recovery; target completion 2028
Asia	Inzai, Chiba, Japan	35°49′04″N 140°07′57″E	Inzai	-	2022 - announced 2023 March - launched	
Europe / Middle East	Istanbul, Türkiye		-	Türkiye	2025 November - announced	US$2B investment in partnership with Turkcell
Asia	Jakarta, Indonesia		-	Jakarta (asia-southeast2)	2020 - launched	
Africa	Johannesburg, South Africa		-	Johannesburg (africa-south1)	2022 - announced 2024 January - launched	Google's first cloud region in Africa
North America	Kansas City (MO), USA		Kansas City	-	2019 - announced	
Asia	Koto-Ku, Tokyo, Japan		-	Tokyo (asia-northeast1)	2016 - launched	
Europe	Kronstorf, Austria		Kronstorf	-	2026 - construction started	
Middle East	Kuwait		-	Kuwait	2023 - announced	
North America	Lancaster (OH), USA		Lancaster	Columbus (us-east5)	2023 May - announced 2024 - launched	120+ acres
North America	Leesburg (VA), USA	39°3′6.38″N 77°32′20.38″W	Loudoun County	N. Virginia (us-east4)	2017 - announced 2019 - launched	
North America	Lenoir (NC), USA	35°53′54.78″N 81°32′50.58″W	Lenoir	-	2007 - announced 2009 - launched	Over 110 employees; $4B+ total investment
North America	Lincoln (NE), USA		Lincoln	-	2023 - announced 2026 - launched	
North America	Little Rock (AR), USA		Little Rock	-	2025 - approved	Port of Little Rock; $1B planned investment
Asia	Lok Yang Way, Pioneer, Singapore	1°19′26″N 103°41′36″E	Singapore	Singapore (asia-southeast1)	2022 - third facility launched 2024 - fourth facility completed	US$5B total investment across four Singapore facilities
Europe	London, UK		-	London (europe-west2)	2017 - launched	
North America	Los Angeles (CA), USA		-	Los Angeles (us-west2)	2018 - launched	
Europe	Madrid, Spain	40°31′10″N 3°20′27″W	-	Madrid (europe-southwest1)	2022 - launched	
Asia	Malaysia (Selangor / Port Dickson)		Malaysia	Malaysia	2022 - cloud region announced 2024 - US$2B data center investment announced	
Pacific	Melbourne, Australia		-	Melbourne (australia-southeast2)	2021 - launched	
North America	Mesa (AZ), USA		Mesa	Phoenix (us-west8)	2023 - construction started 2025 - operational	Air-cooled campus
Europe	Middenmeer, Noord-Holland, The Netherlands	52°47′24″N 5°01′45″E	Middenmeer	Netherlands (europe-west4)	2019 - announced 2020 - launched	
North America	Midlothian (TX), USA	32°26′35″N 97°03′44″W	Midlothian	Dallas (us-south1)	2019 - announced 2022 - launched	375-acres; $600M building costs
Europe	Milan, Italy		-	Milan (europe-west8)	2022 - launched	
North America	Moncks Corner (SC), USA	33°03′50.8″N 80°02′36.1″W	Berkeley County	South Carolina (us-east1)	2007 - launched 2013 - expanded	150 employees
North America	Montreal, Quebec, Canada		-	Montréal (northamerica-northeast1)	2018 - launched	62.4-hectares; $600M building costs
Asia	Mumbai, India		-	Mumbai (asia-south1)	2017 - launched	
North America	Muskogee County (OK), USA		Muskogee County	-	2025 - announced	Part of US$9B Oklahoma cloud and AI investment
North America	New Albany (OH), USA	40°03′41″N 82°45′31″W	New Albany	Columbus (us-east5)	2019 - announced 2023 - operational	400-acres; $600M initial building costs
North America	Omaha (NE), USA		Omaha	-	2022 - announced 2024 - operational	
Asia	Osaka, Japan		-	Osaka (asia-northeast2)	2019 - launched	
South America	Osasco, São Paulo, Brazil		-	São Paulo (southamerica-east1)	2017 - launched	
Europe	Oslo and Skien, Norway		Skien	Oslo	2022 - cloud region announced 2024 January - Skien groundbreaking 2026 - Skien operational	€600M (240 MW) campus at Gromstul in Skien
North America	Pampa (Gray and Roberts Counties) (TX), USA		Gray and Roberts Counties	-	2026 - announced	In development
North America	Papillion (NE), USA	41°08′00″N 96°08′39″W	Papillion	-	2019 - announced 2022, 2023 - expanded	275-acres; $600M initial building costs
Europe	Paris, France		-	Paris (europe-west9)	2022 - launched	
North America	Pine Island (MN), USA		Pine Island	-	2026 February - announced	Developed in clean-energy partnership with Xcel Energy
North America	Prince William County (VA), USA		Prince William County	N. Virginia (us-east4)	2023 - launched	Third Google data center campus in Northern Virginia
North America	Pryor Creek (OK), USA	36°14′28.1″N 95°19′48.22″W	Mayes County	-	2007 - announced 2012, 2018 - expanded	Over 400 employees; land at MidAmerica Industrial Park
North America	Querétaro, Mexico		-	Querétaro (northamerica-south1)	2022 - announced 2024 December - launched	
South America	Quilicura, Santiago, Chile	33°21′30.5″S 70°41′50.4″W	Quilicura	Santiago (southamerica-west1)	2012 - announced 2015 - launched	Up to 20 employees expected; $140M expansion plan announced in 2018.
North America	Red Oak (TX), USA		Red Oak	Dallas (us-south1)	2023 - announced	Second Ellis County campus in North Texas
North America	Reno / Storey County (NV), USA	39°30′04″N 119°25′46″W	Storey County	-	2017 - 1,210 acres of land bought in the Tahoe Reno Industrial Center; 2018 November - project approved 2021 - launched	
North America	Salt Lake City (UT), USA		-	Salt Lake City (us-west3)	2020 - launched	
Asia	Seoul, South Korea		-	Seoul (asia-northeast3)	2020 - launched	
North America	Stillwater (OK), USA		Stillwater	-	2025 - announced	Part of US$9B Oklahoma cloud and AI investment
Pacific	Sydney, Australia		-	Sydney (australia-southeast1)	2017 - launched	
Asia	Tainan City, Taiwan		-	Taiwan (asia-east1)	2019 September - announced	
Middle East	Tel Aviv, Israel		-	Tel Aviv (me-west1)	2022 - launched	
North America	The Dalles (OR), USA	45°37′57.04″N 121°12′8.16″W	The Dalles	Oregon (us-west1)	2006 - launched	80 full-time employees
North America	Toronto, Canada		-	Toronto (northamerica-northeast2)	2021 - launched	
North America	Tulsa County (OK), USA		Tulsa County	-	2026 - announced	In development
Europe	Turin, Italy	45°08′48″N 7°44′32″E	-	Turin (europe-west12)	2023 - launched	
South America	Vinhedo, São Paulo, Brazil		-	São Paulo (southamerica-east1)	2017 - launched	
Asia	Visakhapatnam, Andhra Pradesh, India	15°54′46″N 79°44′24″E	Andhra Pradesh	-	2025 July - announced	Google plans to invest US$15 billion to build a 1 GW data center campus in Visakhapatnam, including US$2 billion for renewable energy infrastructure. It is expected to be the company's largest data center project in Asia.
Europe	Waltham Cross, Hertfordshire, UK	51°41′44″N 0°02′55″W	Waltham Cross	London (europe-west2)	2024 January - announced	US$1B investment on 33-acre site
Europe	Warsaw, Poland		-	Warsaw (europe-central2)	2019 - announced 2021 - launched	
Asia	Wenya, Jurong West, Singapore	1°21′04.8″N 103°42′35.2″E	Singapore	Singapore (asia-southeast1)	2011 - announced 2013 - launched 2015 - expanded	
North America	West Memphis (AR), USA		West Memphis	-	2025 October - announced	1,000+ acre campus; multi-billion dollar investment
North America	Widows Creek (Bridgeport) (AL), USA	34°54′48.4″N 85°44′53.1″W	Jackson County	-	2018 - broke ground	Built on former Widows Creek Fossil Plant site
North America	Wilbarger County (TX), USA		Wilbarger County	-	2026 - announced	In development
Europe	Winschoten, Groningen, Netherlands		Winschoten	Netherlands (europe-west4)	2025 - launched	Google's third operating data center in the Netherlands
Asia	Yunlin County, Taiwan		-	Taiwan (asia-east1)	2020 September - announced	
Europe	Zürich, Switzerland	47°26′45″N 8°12′39″E	-	Zurich (europe-west6)	2018 - announced 2019 - launched	

== Hardware ==
=== Original hardware ===
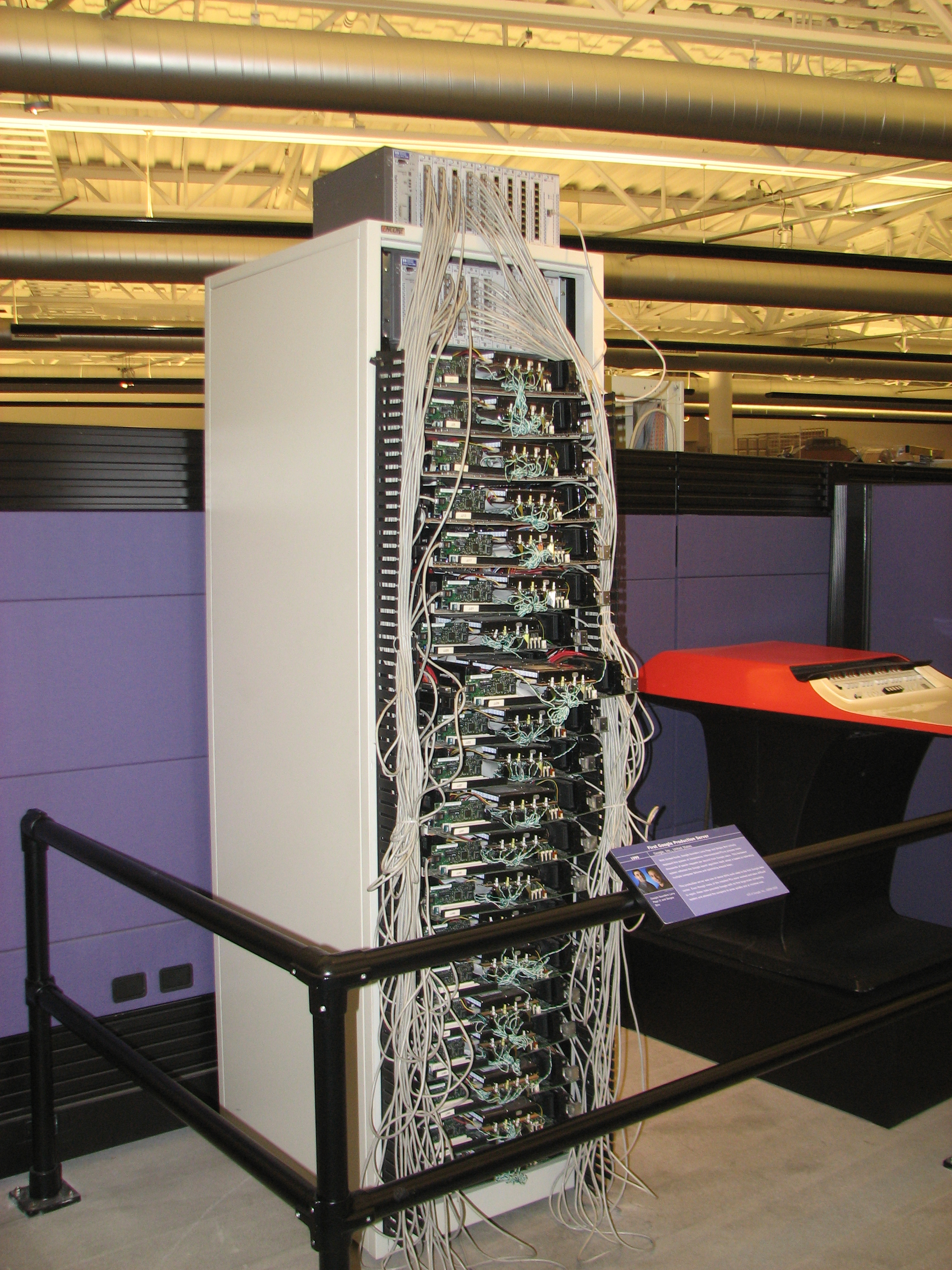
Google's first production server rack, c. 1998

The original hardware (circa 1998) that was used by Google when it was located at Stanford University included:

- Sun Microsystems Ultra II with dual 200 MHz processors, and 256 MB of RAM. This was the main machine for the original Backrub system.
- 2 × 300 MHz dual Pentium II servers donated by Intel, they included 512 MB of RAM and 10 × 9 GB hard drives between the two. It was on these that the main search ran.
- F50 IBM RS/6000 donated by IBM, included 4 processors, 512 MB of memory and 8 × 9 GB hard disk drives.
- Two additional boxes included 3 × 9 GB hard drives and 6 x 4 GB hard disk drives respectively (the original storage for Backrub). These were attached to the Sun Ultra II.
- SSD disk expansion box with another 8 × 9 GB hard disk drives donated by IBM.
- Homemade disk box which contained 10 × 9 GB SCSI hard disk drives.

s=== Google Cluster as of 2003===

The state of Google infrastructure in 2003 was described in a report by Luiz André Barroso, Jeff Dean, and Urs Hölzle as a "reliable computing infrastructure from clusters of unreliable commodity PCs".

At the time, on average, a single search query read ~100 MB of data, and consumed $\sim 10^{10}$ CPU cycles. During peak time, Google served ~1000 queries per second. To handle this peak load, they built a compute cluster with ~15,000 commodity-class PCs instead of expensive supercomputer hardware to save money. To make up for the lower hardware reliability, they wrote fault tolerant software.

The structure of the cluster consists of five parts. Central Google Web servers (GWS) face the public Internet. Upon receiving a user request, the Google Web server communicates with a spell checker, an advertisement server, many index servers, many document servers. Each of the four parts responds to a part of the request, and the GWS assembles their responses and serves the final response to the user.

The raw documents were ~100 TB, and the index files were ~10 TB. The index files are sharded, and each shard is served by a "pool" of index servers. Similarly, the raw documents are also sharded. Each query to the index file results in a list of document IDs, which are then sent to the document servers to retrieve the title and the keyword-in-context snippets.

There were several CPU generations in use, ranging from single-processor 533 MHz Intel-Celeron-based servers to dual 1.4 GHz Intel Pentium III. Each server contained one or more hard drives, 80 GB each. Index servers have less disk space than document servers. Each rack had two Ethernet switches, one per side. The servers on each side interconnected via a 100-Mbps. Each switch had a ~250 MB/sec uplink to a central switch that connected to all racks.

The design objectives include:

- Use low-reliability consumer hardware and make up for it with fault-tolerant software.
- Maximize parallelism, such as by splitting a single document match lookup in a large index into a MapReduce over many small indices.
- Partition index data and computation to minimize communication and evenly balance the load across servers, because the cluster is a large shared-memory machine.
- Minimize system management overheads by developing all software in-house.
- Pick hardware that maximizes performance/price, not absolute performance.
- Pick hardware that has high thoroughput over high latency. This is because queries are served with massive parallelism, with very few dependent steps and minimal communication between servers, so high latency does not matter.

Due to the massive parallelism, scaling up hardware scales up the thoroughput linearly, i.e. doubling the compute cluster doubles the number of queries servable per second.

The cluster is made of server racks at 2 configurations: 40 x 1u per side with 2 sides, or 20 x 2u per side with 2 sides. The power consumption is 10 kW per rack, at a density of 400 W/ft^2, consuming 10 MWh per month, costing $1,500 per month.

=== Production hardware ===
As of 2014, Google has used a heavily customized version of Debian Linux. They migrated from a Red Hat-based system incrementally in 2013.

The customization goal is to purchase CPU generations that offer the best performance per dollar, not absolute performance. How this is measured is unclear, but it is likely to incorporate running costs of the entire server, and CPU power consumption could be a significant factor. Servers as of 2009–2010 consisted of custom-made open-top systems containing two processors (each with several cores), a considerable amount of RAM spread over 8 DIMM slots housing double-height DIMMs, and at least two SATA hard disk drives connected through a non-standard ATX-sized power supply unit. The servers were open top so more servers could fit into a rack. According to CNET and a book by John Hennessy, each server had a novel 12-volt battery to reduce costs and improve power efficiency.

According to Google, their global data center operation electrical power ranged between 500 and 681 megawatts by 2010, with combined processing power estimated at 20 to 100 petaflops in 2008. By 2024, annual data center electricity consumption reached 30.8 million megawatt-hours (MWh)—more than double its 2020 level and accounting for 95.8% of Google's total electricity use—before rising an additional 37% year-over-year in 2025 due to expanding cloud and AI workloads.

Beginning in 2015, Google supplemented general-purpose x86 processors with custom-designed application-specific integrated circuits (ASICs), most notably Tensor Processing Units (TPUs) for machine learning training and inference. Subsequent generations—including liquid-cooled TPU v3 pods (2018), optically interconnected TPU v4 (2021), sixth-generation Trillium (2024), seventh-generation Ironwood (2025), and eighth-generation TPU 8t and 8i chips—have scaled single-pod compute into the exaflops range while improving power efficiency nearly 30-fold over the first Cloud TPU. In 2024, Google also introduced Axion, its first custom Arm-based data center CPU.

=== Network topology ===
Details of the Google worldwide private networks are not publicly available, but Google publications make references to the "Atlas Top 10" report that ranks Google as the third largest ISP behind Level 3.

In order to run such a large network, with direct connections to as many ISPs as possible at the lowest possible cost, Google has a very open peering policy.

From this site, we can see that the Google network can be accessed from 67 public exchange points and 69 different locations across the world. As of May 2012, Google had 882 Gbit/s of public connectivity (not counting private peering agreements that Google has with the largest ISPs). This public network is used to distribute content to Google users as well as to crawl the internet to build its search indexes. The private side of the network is a secret, but a recent disclosure from Google indicate that they use custom-built high-radix (high port-count) switch-routers (with a capacity of 128 × 10 Gigabit Ethernet port) for the wide area network. Running no less than two routers per datacenter (for redundancy) we can conclude that the Google network scales in the terabit per second range (with two fully loaded routers the bi-sectional bandwidth amount to 1,280 Gbit/s).

These custom switch-routers are connected to DWDM devices to interconnect data centers and point of presences (PoP) via dark fiber.

From a datacenter view, the network starts at the rack level, where 19-inch racks are custom-made and contain 40 to 80 servers (20 to 40 1U servers on either side, while new servers are 2U rackmount systems. Each rack has an Ethernet switch). Servers are connected via a 1 Gbit/s Ethernet link to the top-of-rack switch (ToR). ToR switches are then connected to a gigabit cluster switch using multiple gigabit or ten gigabit uplinks. The cluster switches themselves are interconnected and form the datacenter interconnect fabric (most likely using a dragonfly design rather than a classic butterfly or flattened butterfly layout).

From an operation standpoint, when a client computer attempts to connect to Google, several DNS servers resolve www.google.com into multiple IP addresses via Round Robin policy. Furthermore, this acts as the first level of load balancing and directs the client to different Google clusters. A Google cluster has thousands of servers, and once the client has connected to the server additional load balancing is done to send the queries to the least loaded web server. This makes Google one of the largest and most complex content delivery networks.

Google has numerous data centers scattered around the world. At least 12 significant Google data center installations are located in the United States. The largest known centers are located in The Dalles, Oregon; Atlanta, Georgia; Reston, Virginia; Lenoir, North Carolina; and Moncks Corner, South Carolina. In Europe, the largest known centers are in Eemshaven and Groningen in the Netherlands and Mons, Belgium. Google's Oceania Data Center is located in Sydney, Australia.

=== Data center network topology ===
To support fault tolerance, increase the scale of data centers and accommodate low-radix switches, Google has adopted various modified Clos topologies in the past. Known internally as Jupiter, this centralized software-defined networking (SDN) fabric initially relied on a hierarchical electrical packet-switched spine to deliver over 1 Pbit/s of total bisection bandwidth across tens of thousands of machines. In 2022, Google disclosed that it had replaced the electrical spine layer in its Jupiter fabric with MEMS-based optical circuit switches (OCS) that dynamically steer light paths between aggregation blocks without optical-to-electrical-to-optical conversion. According to Google, this optical interconnection layer enabled live topology reconfiguration, reduced network capital expenditure by 30%, and cut network power consumption by 41%.

=== Project 02 ===
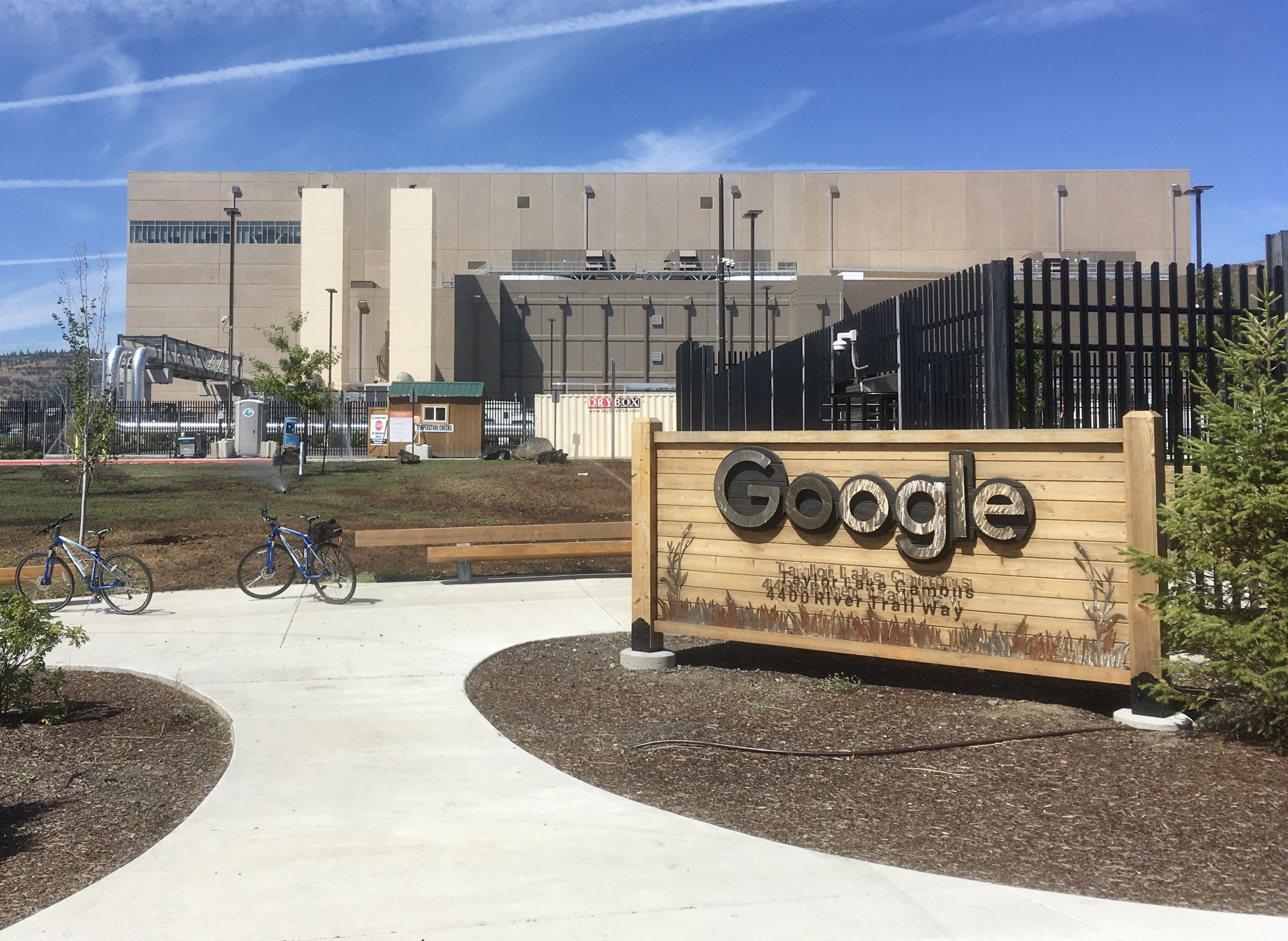
Google data center in The Dalles, Oregon

One of the largest Google data centers is located in the town of The Dalles, Oregon, on the Columbia River, approximately 80 miles (129 km) from Portland. Codenamed "Project 02", the complex was built in 2006 and is approximately the size of two American football fields, with cooling towers four stories high. The site was chosen to take advantage of inexpensive hydroelectric power, and to tap into the region's large surplus of fiber optic cable, a remnant of the dot-com boom. A blueprint of the site appeared in 2008.

=== Summa papermill ===
In February 2009, Stora Enso announced that they had sold the Summa paper mill in Hamina, Finland to Google for 40 million Euros. Google invested 200 million euros on the site to build a data center and announced additional 150 million euro investment in 2012. Google chose this location due to the availability and proximity of renewable energy sources.

=== Floating data centers ===
In 2013, the press revealed the existence of Google's floating data centers along the coasts of the states of California (Treasure Island's Building 3) and Maine. The development project was maintained under tight secrecy. The data centers are 250 feet long, 72 feet wide, 16 feet deep. The patent for an in-ocean data center cooling technology was bought by Google in 2009 (along with a wave-powered ship-based data center patent in 2008). Shortly thereafter, Google declared that the two massive and secretly built infrastructures were merely "interactive learning centers, [...] a space where people can learn about new technology."

Google halted work on the barges in late 2013 and began selling off the barges in 2014.

== Software ==
Most of the software stack that Google uses on their servers was developed in-house. According to a well-known former Google employee in 2006, C++, Java, Python and (more recently) Go are favored over other programming languages. For example, the back end of Gmail is written in Java and the back end of Google Search is written in C++. Google has acknowledged that Python has played an important role from the beginning, and that it continues to do so as the system grows and evolves.

The software that runs the Google infrastructure includes:

- Google Web Server (GWS) – custom Linux-based Web server that Google uses for its online services.
- Storage systems:
  - Google File System and its successor, Colossus
  - Bigtable – structured storage built upon GFS/Colossus
  - Spanner – planet-scale database, supporting externally-consistent distributed transactions
  - Google F1 – a distributed, quasi-SQL DBMS based on Spanner, substituting a custom version of MySQL.
- Chubby lock service
- MapReduce and Sawzall programming language
- Indexing/search systems:
  - TeraGoogle – Google's large search index (launched in early 2006)
  - Caffeine (Percolator) – continuous indexing system (launched in 2010).
  - Hummingbird – major search index update, including complex search and voice search.
- Borg – cluster manager and declarative job scheduling system that orchestrates containerized Linux workloads across tens of thousands of machines per cell, serving as the architectural basis for Kubernetes.

Google has developed several abstractions which it uses for storing most of its data:

- Protocol Buffers – "Google's lingua franca for data", a binary serialization format which is widely used within the company.
- SSTable (Sorted Strings Table) – a persistent, ordered, immutable map from keys to values, where both keys and values are arbitrary byte strings. It is also used as one of the building blocks of Bigtable.
- RecordIO – a sequence of variable sized records.

=== Software development practices ===
Most operations are read-only. When an update is required, queries are redirected to other servers, so as to simplify consistency issues. Queries are divided into sub-queries, where those sub-queries may be sent to different ducts in parallel, thus reducing the latency time.

To lessen the effects of unavoidable hardware failure, software is designed to be fault tolerant. Thus, when a system goes down, data is still available on other servers, which increases reliability.

== Search infrastructure ==
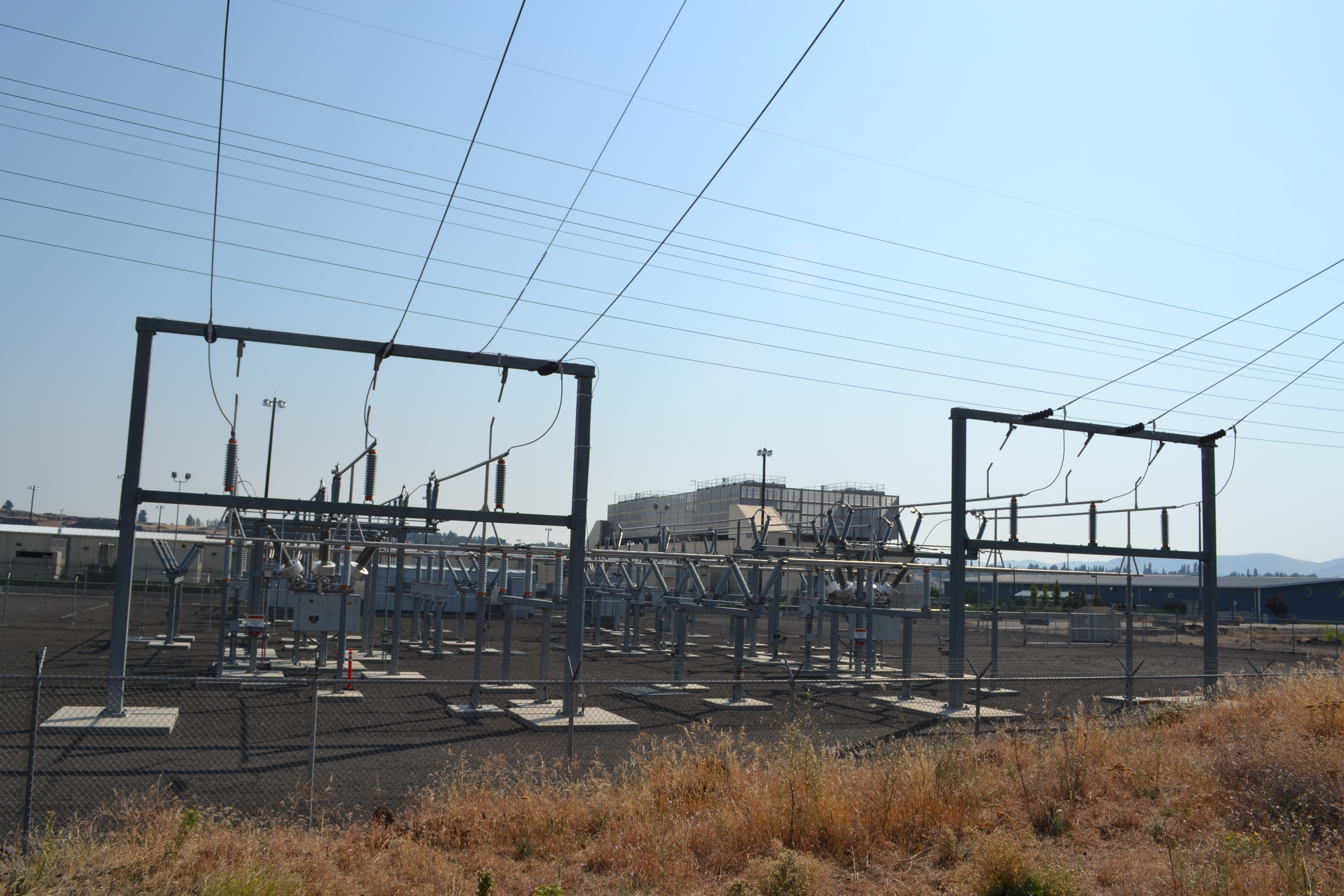
Google data center in The Dalles, Oregon

=== Index ===
Like most search engines, Google indexes documents by building a data structure known as inverted index. Such an index obtains a list of documents by a query word. The index is very large due to the number of documents stored in the servers.

The index is partitioned by document IDs into many pieces called shards. Each shard is replicated onto multiple servers. Initially, the index was being served from hard disk drives, as is done in traditional information retrieval (IR) systems. Google dealt with the increasing query volume by increasing number of replicas of each shard and thus increasing number of servers. Soon they found that they had enough servers to keep a copy of the whole index in main memory (although with low replication or no replication at all), and in early 2001 Google switched to an in-memory index system. This switch "radically changed many design parameters" of their search system, and allowed for a significant increase in throughput and a large decrease in latency of queries.

In June 2010, Google rolled out a next-generation indexing and serving system called "Caffeine" which can continuously crawl and update the search index. Previously, Google updated its search index in batches using a series of MapReduce jobs. The index was separated into several layers, some of which were updated faster than the others, and the main layer wouldn't be updated for as long as two weeks. With Caffeine, the entire index is updated incrementally on a continuous basis. Later Google revealed a distributed data processing system called "Percolator" which is said to be the basis of Caffeine indexing system.

=== Server types ===
Google's server infrastructure is divided into several types, each assigned to a different purpose:

- Web servers coordinate the execution of queries sent by users, then format the result into an HTML page. The execution consists of sending queries to index servers, merging the results, computing their rank, retrieving a summary for each hit (using the document server), asking for suggestions from the spelling servers, and finally getting a list of advertisements from the ad server.
- Data-gathering servers are permanently dedicated to spidering the Web. Google's web crawler is known as GoogleBot. They update the index and document databases and apply Google's algorithms to assign ranks to pages.
- Each index server contains a set of index shards. They return a list of document IDs ("docid"), such that documents corresponding to a certain docid contain the query word. These servers need less disk space, but suffer the greatest CPU workload.
- Document servers store documents. Each document is stored on dozens of document servers. When performing a search, a document server returns a summary for the document based on query words. They can also fetch the complete document when asked. These servers need more disk space.
- Ad servers manage advertisements offered by services like AdWords and AdSense.
- Spelling servers make suggestions about the spelling of queries.

There are also "canary requests", whereby a request is first sent to one or two leaf servers to see if the response time is reasonable. If not, then the request fails. This provides security.

== Security ==
External videos
- YouTube
- Google Data Center Security: 6 Layers Deep

In October 2013, The Washington Post reported that the U.S. National Security Agency intercepted communications between Google's data centers, as part of a program named MUSCULAR. This wiretapping was made possible because, at the time, Google did not encrypt data passed inside its own network. This was rectified when Google began encrypting data sent between data centers in 2013.

Physical access to Google data centers is restricted through a six-layer perimeter defense model incorporating anti-climb fencing, vehicle crash barriers, thermal cameras, biometric iris scanners, and 24/7 security operations centers, with fewer than 1% of Google employees permitted onto the server floor. At the hardware level, servers are equipped with Google's custom-designed Titan security microcontrollers, which establish a hardware root of trust to cryptographically verify system firmware at boot and prevent unauthorized code execution or physical interposer attacks. Data stored across the fleet is chunked, replicated across multiple systems, and encrypted both at rest and in transit.

== Environmental impact ==
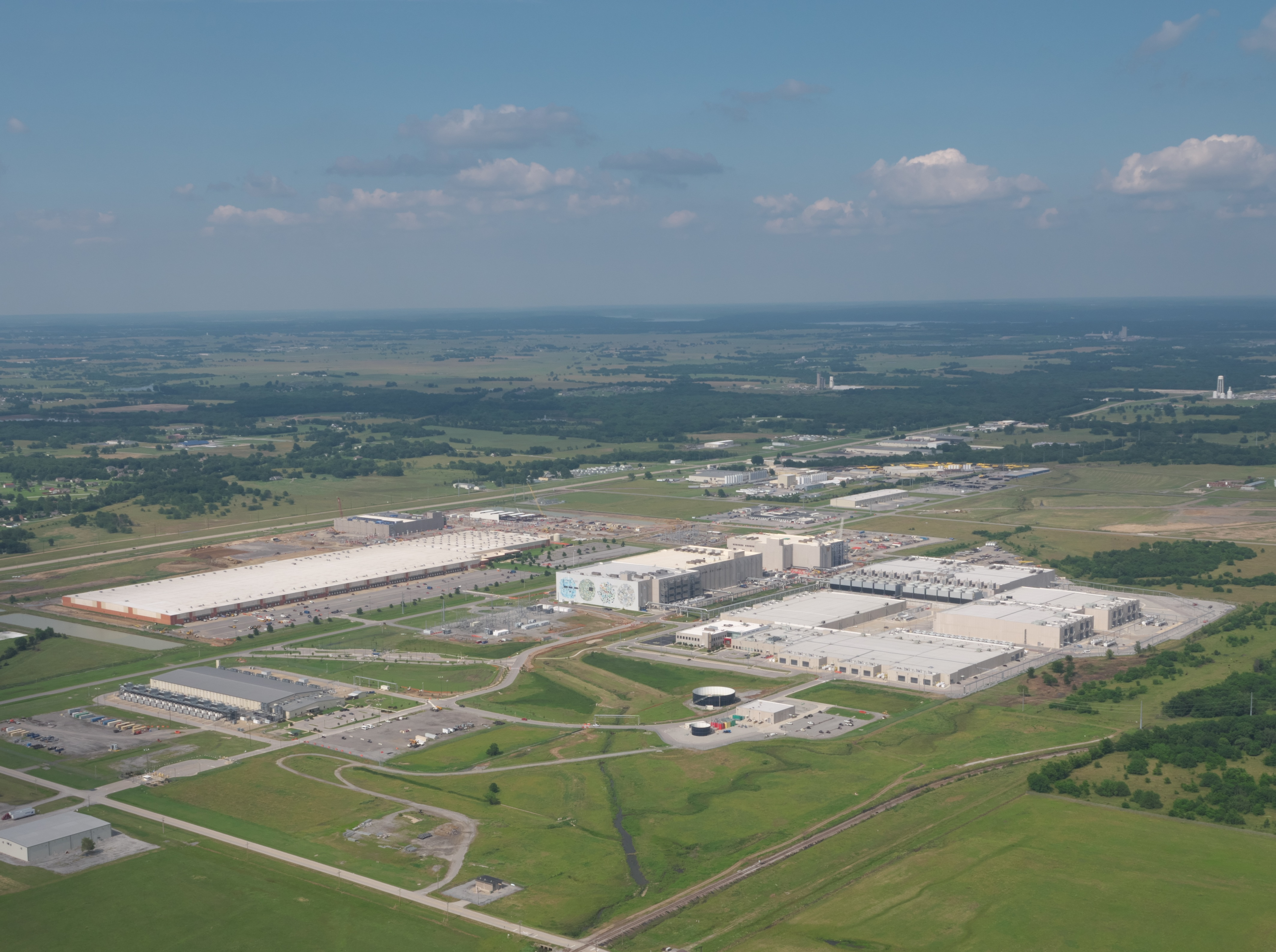
Google data center in Mayes County, Oklahoma at MidAmerica Industrial Park

Some of Google's most efficient data centers in 2012 ran at 35 °C (95 °F) using only fresh air cooling, requiring no electrically powered air conditioning. As of 2025, Google reported a fleet-wide average power usage effectiveness (PUE) of 1.09, using 83% less overhead energy than the industry average of 1.56. While high-density AI accelerator pods utilize direct-to-chip liquid cooling, overall data center water consumption climbed 34% in 2025 to 10.9 billion gallons—prompting Google to adopt air-cooling systems for new campuses in water-scarce regions such as Mesa, Arizona, and Canelones, Uruguay, while replenishing 7.7 billion gallons (78% of its 2025 freshwater consumption) through watershed restoration projects.

In December 2016, Google announced that—starting in 2017—it would purchase enough renewable energy to match 100% of the energy usage of its data centers and offices. The commitment made Google "the world's largest corporate buyer of renewable power, with commitments reaching 2.6 gigawatts (2,600 megawatts) of wind and solar energy". In 2020, Google set a more stringent target to operate on 24/7 carbon-free energy on every grid where it operates by 2030; in 2024, 66% of its global data center electricity was matched with hourly carbon-free sources, and in 2025 the company signed agreements for a record 12 GW of net-new clean energy.

To secure baseload carbon-free power for AI data centers, Google signed a power purchase agreement with Kairos Power in October 2024 for up to 500 MW of electricity from molten-salt small modular reactors scheduled to come online between 2030 and 2035. In 2025, Google agreed to pay to restart the 600 MW Duane Arnold nuclear power station in Iowa by 2029.
