= ACM Prize in Computing =

- Awarded for: Early to mid-career innovative contributions in computing
- Country: United States
- Presented by: Association for Computing Machinery (ACM)
- Reward: $250,000
- First award: 2007
- Website: awards.acm.org/acm-prize

The ACM Prize in Computing was established by the Association for Computing Machinery to recognize individuals for early to mid-career innovative contributions to computing. It is generally recognized as one of the highest distinction in the field of computer science together with the Turing Award. While the Abel Prize in Mathematics is comparable to the Turing award, the Prize in Computing is similar to the Fields Medal in Mathematics in that it is the highest award in the field given to mid-career scientists. ACM Prize in Computing recipients are invited to participate in the Heidelberg Laureate Forum along with Turing Award recipients, Abel Prize winners, and Nobel Laureates. As of 2026, 20 people have been awarded the prize, with the most recent recipients being Matei Zaharia, who won in 2025.

The ACM Prize in Computing was previously known as the ACM-Infosys Foundation Award in the Computing Sciences for award years 2007 through 2015. The award carries a prize of $250,000. Financial support is provided by an endowment from Infosys Inc. It is one of the two highest distinctions given by the Association for Computing Machinery.

The first recipient was Daphne Koller and the youngest recipients were Jon Kleinberg and Shwetak Patel who won in 2008 and 2019, respectively, at the age of 37. The oldest recipient was Sanjay Ghemawat, who won in 2012 at the age of 46. As of 2026, four women have been awarded the prize.

== Recipients ==
Year	Recipients	Citation
2025	Matei Zaharia	For his visionary development of distributed data systems and computing infrastructure, which has enabled large-scale machine learning, analytics, and AI at global scale
2024	Torsten Hoefler	For fundamental contributions to high-performance computing and the ongoing AI revolution
2023	Amanda Randles	For ground-breaking contributions to computational health through innovative algorithms, tools, and high performance computing methods for diagnosing and treating a variety of human diseases
2022	Yael Tauman Kalai	For breakthroughs in verifiable delegation of computation and fundamental contributions to cryptography.
2021	Pieter Abbeel	For contributions to robot learning, including learning from demonstrations and deep reinforcement learning for robotic control.
2020	Scott Aaronson	For groundbreaking contributions to quantum computing.
2019	David Silver	For breakthrough advances in computer game-playing.
2018	Shwetak Patel	For contributions to creative and practical sensing systems for sustainability and health.
2017	Dina Katabi	For her groundbreaking work in human-sensing technologies using wireless signals and in reducing interference across wireless networks.
2016	Alexei A. Efros	For groundbreaking data-driven approaches to computer graphics and computer vision.
2015	Stefan Savage	For innovative research in network security, privacy, and reliability that has taught us to view attacks and attackers as elements of an integrated technological, societal, and economic system.
2014	Dan Boneh	For ground-breaking contributions to the development of pairing-based cryptography and its application in identity-based encryption.
2013	David Blei	For contributions to the theory and practice of probabilistic topic modeling and Bayesian machine learning.
2012	Jeffrey Dean and Sanjay Ghemawat	For their leadership in the science and engineering of Internet-scale distributed systems.
2011	Sanjeev Arora	For contributions to computational complexity, algorithms, and optimization that have helped reshape our understanding of computation.
2010	Frans Kaashoek	For his landmark contributions to the structuring, robustness, scalability, and security of software systems, enabling efficient, mobile, and highly distributed applications and setting important research directions.
2009	Eric A. Brewer	For his design and development of highly scalable internet services and innovations in bringing information technology to developing regions.
2008	Jon Kleinberg	For his contributions to the science of networks and the World Wide Web. His work is a deep combination of social insights and mathematical reasoning.
2007	Daphne Koller	For her work on combining relational logic and probability that allows probabilistic reasoning to be applied to a wide range of applications, including robotics, economics, and biology.

== See also ==
- List of computer science awards
