= SIGOPS Mark Weiser Award =

The ACM SIGOPS (Special Interest Group on Operating Systems) Mark Weiser Award is awarded to an individual who has shown creativity and innovation in operating system research. The recipients began their career no earlier than 20 years prior to nomination. The special-interest-group-level award was created in 2001 and is named after Mark Weiser, the father of ubiquitous computing.

The winners of this award have been:

- 2026: Shan Lu, University of Chicago
- 2025: Junfeng Yang, Columbia University
- 2024: George Candea, EPFL
- 2023: Matei Zaharia, UC Berkeley
- 2022: David Andersen, Carnegie Mellon University
- 2021: Michael J. Freedman, Princeton University
- 2020: Jason Flinn, University of Michigan and Facebook
- 2019: Ion Stoica, UC Berkeley
- 2018: Andrea Arpaci-Dusseau and Remzi Arpaci-Dusseau, University of Wisconsin-Madison
- 2017: Nickolai Zeldovich, MIT
- 2016: Antony Rowstron, Microsoft Research (Cambridge)
- 2015: Yuanyuan Zhou, UCSD
- 2014: Eddie Kohler, Harvard University
- 2013: Stefan Savage, UCSD
- 2012: Jeff Dean and Sanjay Ghemawat, Google
- 2011: Miguel Castro, Microsoft Research
- 2010: Robert Tappan Morris, MIT
- 2009: Eric Brewer, UC Berkeley/Google
- 2008: Peter Druschel, MPI
- 2007: Peter M. Chen, University of Michigan
- 2006: Dawson Engler, Stanford University
- 2005: Thomas E. Anderson, University of Washington
- 2004: Brian N. Bershad, University of Washington and Google
- 2003: Mike Burrows, Google
- 2002: Mendel Rosenblum, Stanford University
- 2001: Frans Kaashoek, MIT

== See also ==
- List of computer science awards
- List of prizes named after people
