= Thomas E. Anderson =

American computer scientist (born 1961)

Tom Anderson
- Born: August 28, 1961 (age 64); Orlando, Florida, U.S.
- Citizenship: US
- Education: Harvard University; University of Washington
- Known for: Distributed computing; networking; operating systems
- Awards: SIGOPS Mark Weiser Award (2005); ACM Fellow (2005); IEEE Koji Kobayashi Computers and Communications Award (2013); USENIX Lifetime Achievement Award (2014); National Academy of Engineering (2016)
- Scientific career
- Fields: Computer science
- Institutions: University of Washington; University of California, Berkeley
- Thesis: Operating system support for high-performance multiprocessing (1991)
- Doctoral advisor: Edward D. Lazowska; Hank Levy
- Doctoral students: Ratul Mahajan; Margaret Martonosi; Stefan Savage; Amin Vahdat
- Website: www.cs.washington.edu/people/faculty/tom/

Thomas Edward Anderson (born August 28, 1961), commonly known as Tom Anderson, is an American computer scientist noted for his research on distributed computing, networking and operating systems.

== Biography ==
Anderson received a Bachelor of Arts with a major in philosophy from Harvard University in 1983. He received a Master of Arts in computer science from University of Washington in 1989 and a Doctor of Philosophy in computer science from University of Washington in 1991.

He then joined the Department of Computer Science at the University of California, Berkeley as an assistant professor in 1991. While there he was promoted to associate professor in 1996. In 1997, he moved to the University of Washington as an associate professor. In 2001, he was promoted to professor, and in 2009 to the Robert E. Dinning Professor in Computer Science. He currently holds the Warren Francis and Wilma Kolm Bradley Endowed Chair.

== Awards ==
His notable awards include:

- ACM SIGOPS Mark Weiser Award in 2005
- ACM Fellow in 2005
- IEEE Koji Kobayashi Computers and Communications Award, 2013
- USENIX Lifetime Achievement Award, 2014
- National Academy of Engineering, 2016, for "contributions to the design of resilient and efficient distributed computer systems."

== Works ==
- Anderson, Thomas; Dahlin, Michael (2014). Operating Systems: Principles and Practice. Recursive Books (self-published). ISBN 978-0-9856735-2-9.
