= Yuanyuan Zhou =

Chinese and American computer scientist

- Education: Peking University (BS); Princeton University (MA, PhD)
- Awards: Sloan Fellow 2007; ACM Fellow 2013; IEEE Fellow 2015; SIGOPS Mark Weiser Award 2015
- Scientific career
- Workplaces: University of Illinois Urbana-Champaign; University of California, San Diego
- Thesis: Memory Management for Networked Servers (2000)
- Doctoral advisor: Kai Li

Yuanyuan (YY) Zhou is a Chinese and American computer scientist and entrepreneur. She is a professor of computer science and engineering at the University of California, San Diego, where she holds the Qualcomm Endowed Chair in Mobile Computing. Her research concerns software reliability, including the use of data mining to automatically detect software bugs and flexible system designs that can adapt to hardware platform variations. She is also the founder of three start-up companies, Emphora, Pattern Insight, and Whova.

== Education and career ==
Zhou earned a Bachelor of Science degree in 1992 from Peking University, before earning her M.A. in 1996 from Princeton University. She went on to earn her Ph.D. in 2001, also from Princeton University, under the supervision of Kai Li. She spent the next two years at the NEC Research Institute in Princeton, where she spun off a start-up from NEC, Emphora, in the area of data storage. Next, she took a faculty position at the University of Illinois Urbana-Champaign in 2002. During her time there, in 2007, she founded her second start-up, Pattern Insight, to commercialize her work in automated bug detection and removal for large software projects; she continues to serve as Pattern Insight's chief technical officer. In 2009, she moved to UCSD, as the first Qualcomm Professor in Mobile Computing. In 2012, she founded her third start-up, event-management software company, Whova.

Zhou is the program chair for the 21st International Conference on Architectural Support for Programming Languages and Operating Systems (ASPLOS 2016), and the program co-chair for the 27th ACM Symposium on Operating Systems Principles (SOSP 2019). Since 2020, she has been a member of the Steering Committee for the International Workshop on Cloud Intelligence / AIOps in conjunction with ICSE, ASPLOS, MLSys, and AAAI annual conferences.

== Awards and honors ==
In 2005, Zhou won the Anita Borg Early Career Award of the Computing Research Association. She was awarded a Sloan Fellowship in 2007. In 2013, she was named a Fellow of the Association for Computing Machinery for "contributions to software reliability and quality", and in 2014, she was named a Fellow of the Institute of Electrical and Electronics Engineers "for contributions to scalable algorithms and tools for computer reliability." In 2015, Zhou won the ACM SIGOPS Mark Weiser Award.

== Speaking ==
Zhou has spoken at various academic and business conferences, including CRA-W Grad Cohort for Women in 2018, and the Grace Hopper Celebration of Women in Computing.

== Select publications ==
- Shan Lu, Soyeon Park, Eunsoo Seo, Yuanyuan Zhou "Learning from mistakes: a comprehensive study on real world concurrency bug characteristics." (2008)
- Zhenmin Li, Shan Lu; Suvda Myagmar; Yuanyuan Zhou "CP-Miner: finding copy-paste and related bugs in large-scale software code." (2006)
- Zhenmin Li, Yuanyuan Zhou "PR-Miner: automatically extracting implicit programming rules and detecting violations in large software code" (2005)
