= Sanjay Ghemawat =

American computer scientist (born 1966)

- Born: 1966 (age 59–60); West Lafayette, Indiana, U.S.
- Education: Cornell University (SB, 1987); MIT (SM, 1990; PhD, 1995)
- Known for: Google File System; MapReduce; Bigtable; Spanner
- Awards: ACM Prize in Computing (2012)
- Scientific career
- Institutions: DEC Systems Research Center; Google
- Thesis: The Modified Object Buffer: A Storage Management Technique for Object-Oriented Databases (1995)
- Doctoral advisors: Barbara Liskov; Frans Kaashoek

Sanjay Ghemawat (born 1966 in West Lafayette, Indiana) is an American computer scientist and software engineer. He is currently a Senior Fellow at Google in the Systems Infrastructure Group. Ghemawat's work at Google, much of it in close collaboration with Jeff Dean, has included big data processing model MapReduce, the Google File System, and databases Bigtable and Spanner. Wired has described him as one of the "most important software engineers of the internet age". Ghemawat co-founded the AI research start-up Discovery Loop in 2026.

Ghemawat was elected as a member into the National Academy of Engineering in 2009 for contributions to the science and engineering of large-scale distributed computer systems.

== Education and early career ==
Ghemawat was born in West Lafayette, Indiana and grew up in Kota, Rajasthan. He studied at Cornell University and the Massachusetts Institute of Technology (MIT). He obtained a PhD from MIT in 1995, with a dissertation titled, The Modified Object Buffer: A Storage Management Technique for Object-Oriented Databases. His advisors were Barbara Liskov and Frans Kaashoek.

Before joining Google, Ghemawat worked at the DEC Systems Research Center. There he began his long-time collaboration with Jeff Dean, who worked at another DEC research lab nearby. Their work at DEC included a Java compiler and a system profiling tool.

== Career at Google ==
After DEC was acquired by Compaq, many of its researchers left the company. Dean took a position at the newly founded search-engine company Google, and was joined by Ghemawat in 1999. The two began working on Google's core infrastructure, making improvements to cope with the search engine's rapid growth in users in the early 2000s.

Ghemawat's work at Google includes:

- Original design of Protocol Buffers, an open-source data interchange format.
- MapReduce, a system for large-scale data processing applications.
- Google File System, is a proprietary distributed file system developed to provide efficient, reliable access to data using large clusters of commodity hardware.
- Spanner, a scalable, multi-version, globally distributed, and synchronously replicated database.
- Bigtable, a large-scale semi-structured storage system.
- LevelDB, an open-source on-disk key-value store.
- TensorFlow, an open-source machine-learning software library.
- Service Weaver, an open-source framework for writing distributed applications.

== Awards and honors ==
Ghemawat was elected to the National Academy of Engineering in 2009, and to the American Academy of Arts and Sciences in 2016. In 2012, he and Dean received the ACM Prize in Computing for their work on internet infrastructure, and the ACM SIGOPS Mark Weiser Award.

== Selected publications ==
- Ghemawat, Sanjay; Gobioff, Howard; Leung, Shun-Tak (2003). "The Google file system". Proceedings of the nineteenth ACM symposium on Operating systems principles. SOSP '03. New York, NY, USA: ACM. pp. 29–43. doi:10.1145/945445.945450. ISBN 1581137575. S2CID 221261373.
- Dean, Jeffrey; Ghemawat, Sanjay (January 2008). "MapReduce: Simplified Data Processing on Large Clusters". Commun. ACM. 51 (1): 107–113. doi:10.1145/1327452.1327492. ISSN 0001-0782. S2CID 221021701.
- Chang, Fay; Dean, Jeffrey; Ghemawat, Sanjay; Hsieh, Wilson C.; Wallach, Deborah A.; Burrows, Mike; Chandra, Tushar; Fikes, Andrew; Gruber, Robert E. (June 2008). "Bigtable: A Distributed Storage System for Structured Data". ACM Trans. Comput. Syst. 26 (2): 4:1–4:26. doi:10.1145/1365815.1365816. ISSN 0734-2071. S2CID 214769387.
- Dean, Jeffrey; Ghemawat, Sanjay (January 2010). "MapReduce: A Flexible Data Processing Tool". Commun. ACM. 53 (1): 72–77. doi:10.1145/1629175.1629198. ISSN 0001-0782.
- Corbett, James C.; Dean, Jeffrey; Epstein, Michael; Fikes, Andrew; Frost, Christopher; Furman, J. J.; Ghemawat, Sanjay; Gubarev, Andrey; Heiser, Christopher (August 2013). "Spanner: Google's Globally Distributed Database". ACM Trans. Comput. Syst. 31 (3): 8:1–8:22. doi:10.1145/2518037.2491245. ISSN 0734-2071.
- Abadi, Martín; Agarwal, Ashish; Barham, Paul; Brevdo, Eugene; Chen, Zhifeng; Citro, Craig; Corrado, Greg S.; Davis, Andy; Dean, Jeffrey (March 14, 2016). "TensorFlow: Large-Scale Machine Learning on Heterogeneous Distributed Systems". arXiv:1603.04467 [cs.DC].
