= Dawson Engler =

American computer scientist and professor

- Education: University of Arizona; Massachusetts Institute of Technology
- Awards: Mark Weiser Award (2006); Grace Murray Hopper Award (2008)
- Scientific career
- Fields: Computer science
- Workplaces: Stanford University
- Thesis: The exokernel operating system architecture (1998)
- Doctoral advisor: Frans Kaashoek

Dawson R. Engler is an American computer scientist and an associate professor of computer science and electrical engineering at Stanford University.

== Career ==
After graduating from University of Arizona, Engler earned his Ph.D. from the Massachusetts Institute of Technology in 1998 while working with Frans Kaashoek in the MIT CSAIL Parallel and Distributed Operating Systems Group. The focus of his graduate studies was the exokernel.

Engler is currently an associate professor of computer science and electrical engineering at Stanford University. In 2002, he co-founded Coverity with several of his students to commercialize his group's work in static code analysis for bug-finding technology.

== Awards and honors ==
Engler and his co-authors received the Best Paper award at USENIX's OSDI conferences in 2000, 2004, and 2008. With his students Cristian Cadar and Daniel Dunbar, he was jointly awarded the 2018 SIGOPS Hall of Fame Award for their paper at the 2008 conference.

Engler won the 2006 SIGOPS Mark Weiser Award for his work in operating systems research. In 2008, he received the Grace Murray Hopper Award for "ground-breaking work on automated program checking and bug-finding".

== Selected publications ==
- Cadar, C.; Dunbar, D.; Engler, D. (December 8, 2008). "Klee: Unassisted and automatic generation of high-coverage tests for complex systems programs". Proceedings of the 8th USENIX Symposium on Operating Systems Design and Implementation, OSDI 2008: 209–224.
- Engler, D. R.; Kaashoek, M. F.; O'Toole, J. (1995). "Exokernel". Proceedings of the fifteenth ACM symposium on Operating systems principles - SOSP '95. pp. 251–266. doi:10.1145/224056.224076. ISBN 0897917154. S2CID 221932539.
- Cadar, Cristian; Ganesh, Vijay; Pawlowski, Peter M.; Dill, David L.; Engler, Dawson R. (2006). "EXE: Automatically generating inputs of death". Proceedings of the 13th ACM conference on Computer and communications security. pp. 322–335. doi:10.1145/1180405.1180445. ISBN 1595935185. S2CID 209393318.
- Engler, Dawson; Ashcraft, Ken (December 2003). "RacerX: effective, static detection of race conditions and deadlocks". ACM SIGOPS Operating Systems Review. 37 (5): 237–252. doi:10.1145/1165389.945468.
- Engler, Dawson; Chen, David Yu; Hallem, Seth; Chou, Andy; Chelf, Benjamin (December 2001). "Bugs as deviant behavior: a general approach to inferring errors in systems code". ACM SIGOPS Operating Systems Review. 35 (5): 57–72. doi:10.1145/502059.502041.
