= Shwetak Patel =

American computer scientist and entrepreneur

Shwetak Naran Patel
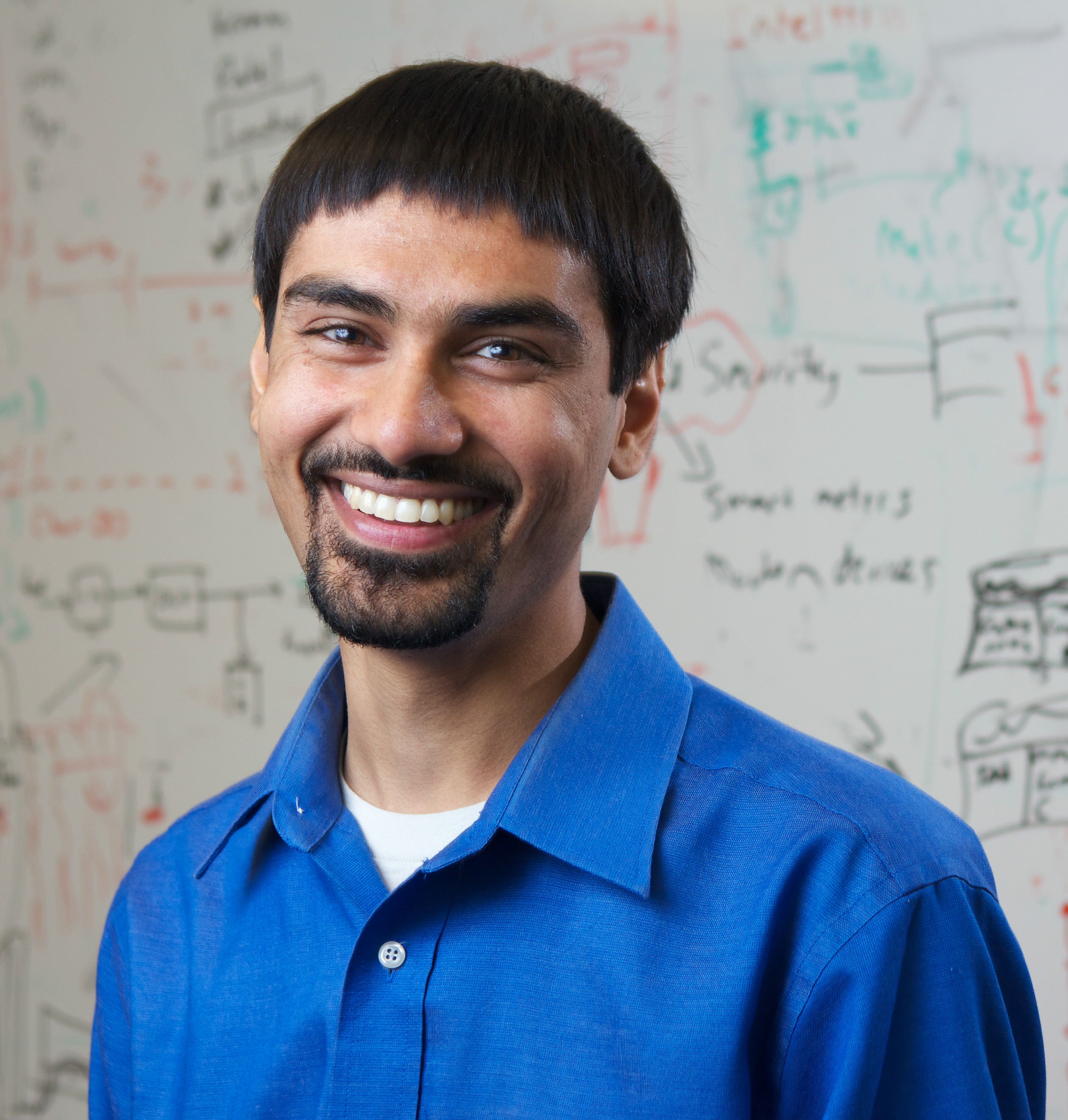
- Shwetak N. Patel in the Ubicomp Lab at the University of Washington
- Born: December 9, 1981 (age 44); Selma, Alabama, US
- Education: Georgia Institute of Technology
- Known for: Sensing, sustainability, ubiquitous computing, energy sensing
- Spouse: Julie A. Kientz
- Awards: MacArthur Fellowship, ACM Prize in Computing, TR35, Microsoft New Faculty Fellowship, Sloan Fellowship, Presidential Early Career Award for Scientists and Engineers, ACM Fellow, Member of the American Academy of Arts and Sciences (2026)
- Scientific career
- Fields: Human-Computer Interaction, Ubiquitous Computing, Embedded Systems
- Workplaces: University of Washington, Computer Science & Engineering, Electrical Engineering
- Doctoral advisor: Gregory Abowd

Shwetak Naran Patel is an American computer scientist and entrepreneur best known for his work on developing novel sensing solutions and ubiquitous computing. He is the Washington Research Foundation Entrepreneurship Endowed Professor at the University of Washington in Computer Science & Engineering and Electrical Engineering, where he joined in 2008. His technology start-up company on energy sensing, Zensi, was acquired by Belkin International, Inc. in 2010. He was named a 2011 MacArthur Fellow. In 2016, He was elected as an ACM Fellow for contributions to sustainability sensing, low-power wireless sensing and mobile health and received Presidential Early Career Award for Scientists and Engineers (PECASE). He was named the recipient of the 2018 ACM Prize in Computing for contributions to creative and practical sensing systems for sustainability and health. He was elected to the American Academy of Arts and Sciences in 2026.

== Early life and career ==
Shwetak Patel was born on December 9, 1981, in Selma, Alabama, though he was raised in Birmingham, Alabama. He attended Jefferson County International Baccalaureate School for high school in Birmingham, graduating in 2000. He received his B.S. in Computer Science from the Georgia Institute of Technology in 2003, and then continued on to receive his Ph.D. in computer science in 2008 under the advisement of Dr. Gregory Abowd. He started as an assistant professor at the University of Washington in 2008, where he remains today. In July 2013, he was promoted to associate professor, and then in July 2014 was named the Washington Research Foundation Endowed Professor.

== Professional career ==
Patel's research is broadly in the areas of ubiquitous computing, human-computer interaction, and user interface software and technology. He has published over 50 articles since 2003 and has received numerous best paper awards. Patel focuses on developing easy-to-deploy sensing technologies, activity recognition, and applications for energy monitoring. He also has developed novel interaction techniques for mobile devices, mobile sensing systems, and wireless sensor platforms, many of which in collaboration with Microsoft Research, where is also a visiting researcher. Dr. Patel's primary research has been in building low-cost and easy-to-deploy sensing systems, which he calls Infrastructure Mediated Sensing. These approaches leverage utility infrastructures in a home to support whole-house sensing.

Patel co-founded a company called Zensi, Inc., while he was a graduate student at Georgia Tech. Zensi was a demand-side energy monitoring solutions provider. In 2010, Zensi was acquired by Belkin, Inc in 2010 for an undisclosed sum. This acquisition resulted in numerous awards for Patel, including making the cover of Seattle Business magazine, newsmaker of the year by TechFlash, and was named one of the top 10 start up stories of 2010 by TechFlash.

Patel has also received international recognition for his work, including the MacArthur Fellowship in 2011, the MIT Technology Review TR-35 award in 2009, the Microsoft Research Faculty Fellowship in 2011, the 2011 India Abroad Face of the Future award, and the Sloan Fellowship in 2012. His work was featured in the cover story of Wired Magazine, and his past work on camera blocking technology was also honored by the New York Times as a top technology of the year in 2005. He also has numerous other articles appearing in the popular media on his inventions. In 2017 he became a Fellow of the Association for Computing Machinery.

In 2026, Patel was elected to the American Academy of Arts and Sciences.

== Personal life ==
Patel is married to Julie A. Kientz, who is also a faculty member at the University of Washington, and lives in Seattle, Washington.

== Selected bibliography ==
- Mariakakis, A., Baudin, J., Whitmire, E., Mehta, V., Banks, M.A., Law, A., Mcgrath, L. and Patel, S.N., 2017. PupilScreen: using smartphones to assess traumatic brain injury. Proceedings of the ACM on Interactive, Mobile, Wearable and Ubiquitous Technologies, 1(3), pp. 1–27.
- Wang, E.J., Li, W., Hawkins, D., Gernsheimer, T., Norby-Slycord, C. and Patel, S.N., 2016, September. HemaApp: noninvasive blood screening of hemoglobin using smartphone cameras. In Proceedings of the 2016 ACM International Joint Conference on Pervasive and Ubiquitous Computing (pp. 593–604).
- De Greef, L., Goel, M., Seo, M.J., Larson, E.C., Stout, J.W., Taylor, J.A. and Patel, S.N., 2014, September. Bilicam: using mobile phones to monitor newborn jaundice. In Proceedings of the 2014 ACM International Joint Conference on Pervasive and Ubiquitous Computing (pp. 331–342).
- Larson, E.C., Goel, M., Boriello, G., Heltshe, S., Rosenfeld, M. and Patel, S.N., 2012, September. SpiroSmart: using a microphone to measure lung function on a mobile phone. In Proceedings of the 2012 ACM conference on ubiquitous computing (pp. 280–289).
- Cohn, G., Morris, D., Patel, S.N., Tan, D.S. Your Noise is My Command: Sensing Gestures Using the Body as an Antenna. CHI 2011. ACM Conference on Human Factors in Computing Systems (CHI 2011).
- Gupta, S., Reynolds, M.S., Patel, S.N. ElectriSense: Single-Point Sensing Using EMI for Electrical Event Detection and Classification in the Home. Ubicomp 2010.
- Froehlich, J. Larson, E., Campbell, T., Haggerty, C., Fogarty, J., and Patel, S.N. HydroSense: Infrastructure-Mediated Single-Point Sensing of Whole-Home Water Activity. UbiComp 2009.
- Cohn, G., Stuntebeck, E., Pandey, J., Otis., B., Abowd, G.D., Patel, S.N. SNUPI: Sensor Nodes Utilizing Powerline Infrastructure. Ubicomp 2010.
- Patel, S.N, Gupta, S., Reynolds, M. The Design and Evaluation of an End-User-Deployable, Whole House, Contactless Power Consumption Sensor. ACM Conference on Human Factors in Computing Systems (CHI 2010).
- Patel, S.N., Robertson, T., Kientz, J.A., Reynolds, M.S., Abowd, G.D. At the Flick of a Switch: Detecting and Classifying Unique Electrical Events on the Residential Power Line. Ubicomp 2007.
