= Remzi Arpaci-Dusseau =

American computer scientist

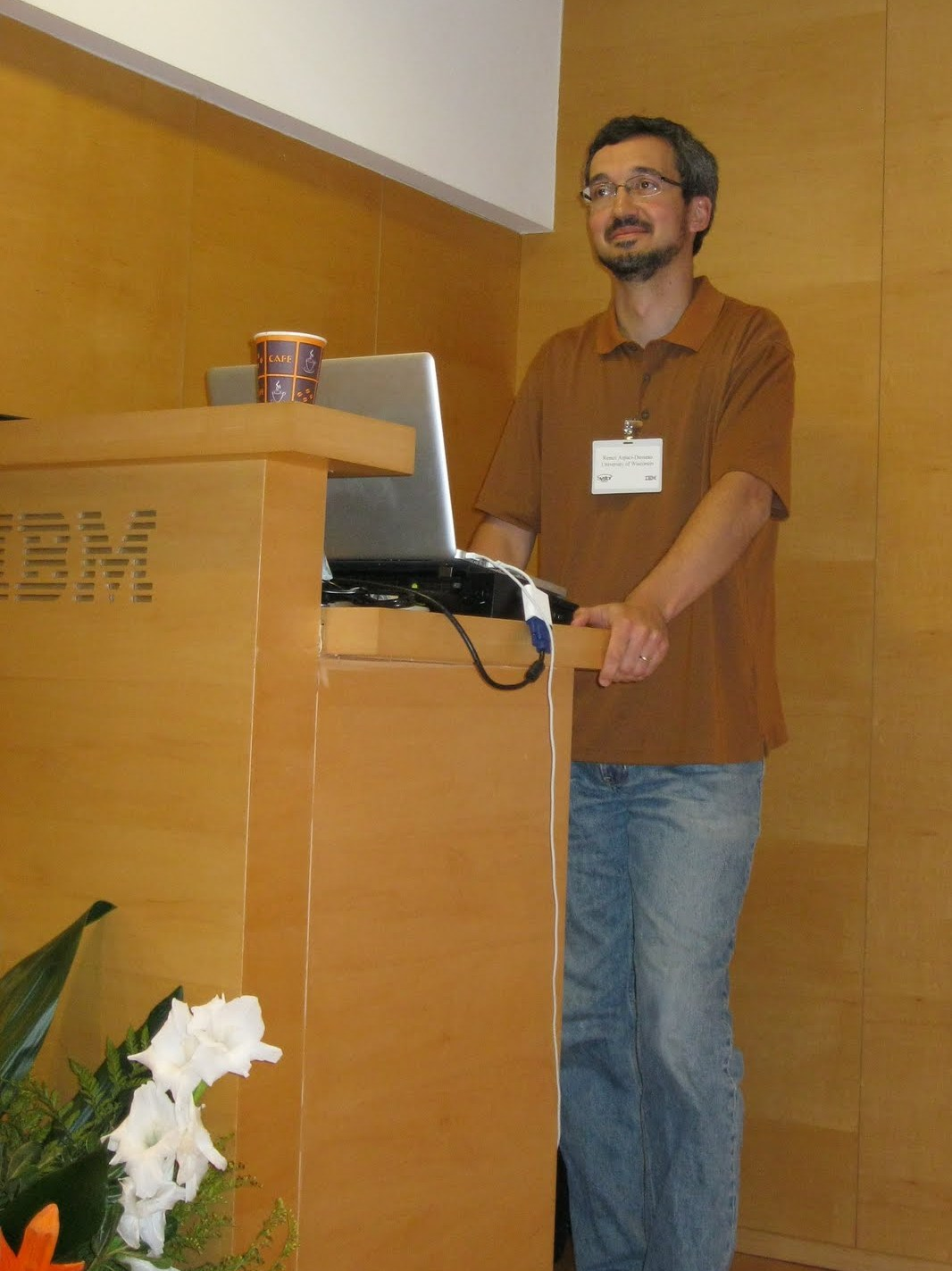
- Other name: Remzi Arpaci
- Education: Ph.D. computer science, University of California, Berkeley, 1999; B.S. computer engineering, University of Michigan-Ann Arbor, 1993
- Known for: data storage and computer systems
- Spouse: Andrea Arpaci-Dusseau
- Awards: SIGOPS Mark Weiser Award, ACM Fellow, AAAS Fellow
- Scientific career
- Fields: Computer science
- Institutions: University of Wisconsin–Madison
- Thesis: Performance Availability for Networks of Workstations (1999)
- Doctoral advisor: David Patterson
- Website: http://www.cs.wisc.edu/~remzi

Remzi Arpaci-Dusseau is the Grace Wahba professor of Computer Sciences at the University of Wisconsin-Madison and former chair of the Computer Sciences department. He co-leads a research group with Professor Andrea Arpaci-Dusseau. He and Andrea have co-written a textbook on operating systems, "Operating Systems: Three Easy Pieces" (OSTEP), that is downloaded millions of times yearly and used at hundreds of institutions worldwide. His research been cited over 15,000 times and is one of the leading experts in the area of data storage.

He currently serves as the Founding Dean of the College of Computing & Artificial Intelligence and as Special Advisor to the Provost on Computing.

== Education ==
Arpaci-Dusseau received his Bachelor of Science at the University of Michigan, Ann Arbor in 1993, then proceeded to earn his Master's in 1996 at the University of California, Berkeley. He later earned his Ph.D at the same institution, with a thesis titled Performance Availability for Networks of Workstations.

== Honors and awards ==
- Mark Weiser Award (2018)
- ACM Fellow (2020)
- AAAS Fellow (2022)
- Vilas Distinguished Achievement Professor (2022)
- UW-Madison Chancellor's Distinguished Teaching Award (2016)
- UC Berkeley Computer Science Distinguished Alumni Award (2023)
- SACM Student's Choice Professor of the Year Award (the COW award) (2001, 2009, 2010, 2011, 2013, 2016, 2018)
- USENIX FAST Test of Time Award (2022)
- USENIX FAST Best Paper Award (2004, 2008, 2009, 2010, 2011, 2013, 2017, 2018, 2020)
- SOSP Best Paper Award (2011)
