= Michael J. Freedman =

American computer scientist

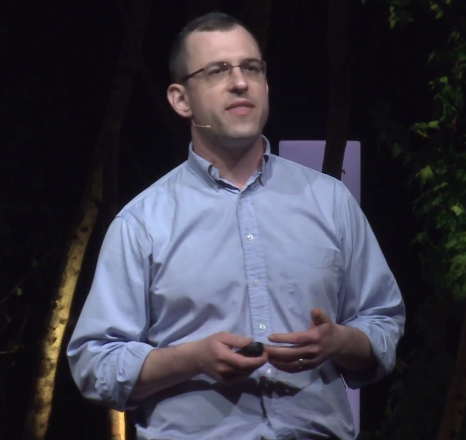
- Born: Michael Joseph Freedman
- Education: Massachusetts Institute of Technology; New York University; Stanford University
- Awards: Presidential Early Career Award for Scientists and Engineers (2011); Grace Murray Hopper Award (2018); ACM Fellow (2019); SIGOPS Mark Weiser Award (2021)
- Scientific career
- Fields: Computer science
- Workplaces: Princeton University
- Thesis: Democratizing Content Distribution (2007)
- Doctoral advisor: David Mazières

Michael J. Freedman is an American computer scientist who is the Robert E. Kahn Professor of Computer Science at Princeton University, where he works on distributed systems, networking, and security. He is also the co-founder of database company Timescale.

== Education and career ==
Freedman graduated from Wyoming Valley West High School in Pennsylvania in 1997. In 2001 and 2002, he earned an S.B. and a M.Eng., respectively, at the Massachusetts Institute of Technology. In 2005 and 2007, he earned an M.S. and a Ph.D., respectively, from the Courant Institute of Mathematical Sciences at New York University, and spent 2005–2007 at Stanford University. Freedman completed his doctoral studies under David Mazières, who Freedman worked with to release the Coral Content Distribution Network in 2004. In 2007, he was appointed a professor at Princeton University.

With David Mazières, Freedman designed and operated the Coral Content Distribution Network, a peer-to-peer content distribution network that was initially released in 2004 and operated until 2015. In March 2006, Freedman co-founded Illuminics Systems, an information technology company working in the area of IP geolocation and intelligence, with Martin Casado. The company was acquired by Quova in November 2006.

Freedman's research interests include distributed systems, networking, and security. In addition to his work with the Coral Content Distribution Network, he has designed systems such as TimescaleDB and JetStream.

== Recognition ==
In 2011, Freedman received the Presidential Early Career Award for Scientists and Engineers for his work in designing, building, and prototyping a "modern, highly scalable, replicated storage cloud system" in addition to efforts to increase student diversity at Princeton University. His research involving the design and deployment of geo-distributed systems earned him the Grace Murray Hopper Award in 2018. He was elected as an ACM Fellow in 2019 "for contributions to robust distributed systems for the modern cloud", and was awarded the SIGOPS Mark Weiser Award by the organization in 2021.

== Selected publications ==
- Freedman, Michael J.; Nissim, Kobbi; Pinkas, Benny (2004). "Efficient Private Matching and Set Intersection". Advances in Cryptology - EUROCRYPT 2004. Lecture Notes in Computer Science. Vol. 3027. pp. 1–19. doi:10.1007/978-3-540-24676-3_1. ISBN 978-3-540-21935-4.
- Freedman, Michael J.; Morris, Robert (2002). "Tarzan: A peer-to-peer anonymizing network layer". Proceedings of the 9th ACM conference on Computer and communications security. pp. 193–206. doi:10.1145/586110.586137. ISBN 1581136129. S2CID 786888.
- Casado, Martin; Freedman, Michael J.; Pettit, Justin; Luo, Jianying; McKeown, Nick; Shenker, Scott (2007). "Ethane: Taking control of the enterprise". Proceedings of the 2007 conference on Applications, technologies, architectures, and protocols for computer communications. pp. 1–12. doi:10.1145/1282380.1282382. ISBN 9781595937131. S2CID 7878230.
- Lloyd, Wyatt; Freedman, Michael J.; Kaminsky, Michael; Andersen, David G. (2011). "Don't settle for eventual". Proceedings of the Twenty-Third ACM Symposium on Operating Systems Principles. pp. 401–416. doi:10.1145/2043556.2043593. ISBN 9781450309776. S2CID 2386464.
- Foster, Nate; Harrison, Rob; Freedman, Michael J.; Monsanto, Christopher; Rexford, Jennifer; Story, Alec; Walker, David (September 18, 2011). "Frenetic: a network programming language". ACM SIGPLAN Notices. 46 (9): 279–291. doi:10.1145/2034574.2034812.
