= Julie A. Kientz =

American computer scientist

- Born: Marion, Ohio, US
- Spouse: Shwetak Patel

Academic background
- Education: B.S., Computer Science & Engineering, 2002, University of Toledo; PhD, Computer Science, 2008, Georgia Tech
- Thesis: Decision support for caregivers through embedded capture and access (2008)
- Doctoral advisor: Gregory Abowd
- Website: juliekientz.com

Julie Anne Kientz is an American computer scientist. Kientz is a full professor in the University of Washington's Department of Human Centered Design & Engineering.

== Early life and education ==
Kientz was born to Tom and Carol in Marion, Ohio, US on May 9, 1980. While attending River Valley High School in the 1990s, she won the Johnny Clearwater Award at the State Science Day. She originally intended to pursue a career in veterinary medicine but changed her path after fainting while watching a dog undergoing surgery. In her senior year, Kientz began taking courses at Ohio State University at Marion through the Post Secondary Enrollment Option.

Upon graduating high school, Kientz enrolled in the computer science engineering department at the University of Toledo. In her senior year, she was one of 12 students selected to participate in a summer research program at the University of California, Berkeley. Following her undergraduate degree, Kientz attended Georgia Tech for her Ph.D. in Computer Science. While there, she was inspired by her advisor Gregory Abowd to investigate technology that could improve the care of children with autism. Prior to creating software or technology, she trained to be a therapist for autistic children and worked as one for a year and a half. In this role, she co-built a prototype called Lullaby to replace the lab exams measuring reaction times. Later, her co-authored paper on Lullaby received the 2012 Best Paper Award from the Association for Computing Machinery (ACM). Kientz also developed Fetch, a software program that could run on cell phones to help its users locate items.

== Career ==
Upon completing her PhD, Kientz accepted an assistant professor position jointly in the Human Centered Design & Engineering (HCDE) and the Information School Departments at the University of Washington. In this role, she established the Computing for Healthy Living and Learning (CHiLL) Laboratory in 2009 to use "User-Centered Design processes to determine if technology performs as expected in a real-world environment." As director of the CHiLL Laboratory, Kientz developed Baby Steps to "transform developmental tracking into one of celebrating children’s achievements." During the same year, she was also awarded a National Science Foundation CAREER Award to "design, develop, and evaluate the effectiveness of computing interventions to assist parents in ensuring the healthy development of their child."

Kientz eventually joined the HCDE Department full-time in 2012 while continuing to direct the CHiLL Laboratory. As a full member of the faculty, she received an $80,000 Hartwell Innovation Award for her project "Innovative Smartphone Application of a New Behavioral Method to Quit Smoking: Development & Usability Testing." By August 2013, Kientz was recognized by MIT Technology Review as one of their 35 innovators under the age of 35. In the same month, she was also selected to receive a Google Faculty Research Award for her project "How Long Should my Study Run For?' Understanding the Effect of Study Duration on User Feedback and Data Saturation." As a result of her academic accomplishments, Kientz was promoted from assistant professor to associate professor. While serving in her new role as an associate professor, Kientz co-authored a study that demonstrated that period-tracking smartphone apps lacked accuracy, made assumptions about sexual identity or partners, and over-emphasized pink and flowery form over function and customization.

Near the conclusion of the 2018–19 academic year, Kientz was promoted to the rank of full professor in HCDE. During the COVID-19 pandemic, Kientz was promoted from Interim Chair to full Chair of the Department by the Dean of the College of Engineering, Nancy Allbritton. In her new role, she co-established the Kientz & Patel HCDE Student Emergency Support Fund to aid HCDE students facing financial hardship due to the pandemic. Kientz also became the principal investigator on a grant supported by the NSF to study the pandemic's effect on family life and the role of technology. In May 2020, Kientz co-published the second edition book of Interactive Technologies and Autism. At the conclusion of the year, she was named an ACM Distinguished Member for outstanding scientific contributions to computing.

== Personal life ==
Kientz is married to Shwetak Patel, who is also a faculty member at the University of Washington, and lives in Seattle, Washington.
