= Andrea Arpaci-Dusseau =

American computer scientist

- Other name: Andrea Dusseau
- Education: Ph.D. computer science, University of California, Berkeley, 1998; B.S. computer engineering, Carnegie Mellon University, 1991
- Known for: data storage and computer systems
- Spouse: Remzi Arpaci-Dusseau
- Awards: SIGOPS Mark Weiser Award, ACM Fellow
- Scientific career
- Fields: Computer science
- Institutions: University of Wisconsin–Madison; Stanford University
- Thesis: Implicit Coscheduling: Coordinated Scheduling with Implicit Information in Distributed Systems (1998)
- Doctoral advisor: David Culler

Andrea Carol Arpaci-Dusseau (also published as Andrea Dusseau) is an American computer scientist interested in operating systems, file systems, data storage, distributed computing, and computer science education. She is a professor of computer sciences at the University of Wisconsin–Madison. She and Remzi Arpaci-Dusseau have co-written a textbook on operating systems, "Operating Systems: Three Easy Pieces" (OSTEP), that is downloaded millions of times yearly and used at hundreds of institutions worldwide.

== Education and career ==
Arpaci-Dusseau majored in computer engineering at Carnegie Mellon University, graduating in 1991. She completed a Ph.D. in computer science at the University of California, Berkeley in 1998; her dissertation, Implicit Coscheduling: Coordinated Scheduling with Implicit Information in Distributed Systems, was supervised by David Culler.

After postdoctoral research at Stanford University, she joined the University of Wisconsin–Madison faculty as an assistant professor in 2000, and became a full professor there in 2009. Andrea primarily teaches undergraduate and graduate level Operating Systems courses.

== Personal life ==
Arpaci-Dusseau is married to Remzi Arpaci-Dusseau, also a professor at the University of Wisconsin–Madison and an expert on data storage; they are frequent collaborators.

== Book ==
With Remzi Arpaci-Dusseau, Arpaci-Dusseau is the co-author of the free 2018 book Operating Systems: Three Easy Pieces.

== Recognition ==
In 2018, Arpaci-Dusseau and her husband were the winners of the SIGOPS Mark Weiser Award, "for outstanding leadership, innovation, and impact in storage and computer systems research". Arpaci-Dusseau was named a 2020 ACM Fellow "for contributions to storage and computer systems".
