= Jeff Dean =

American computer scientist and software engineer

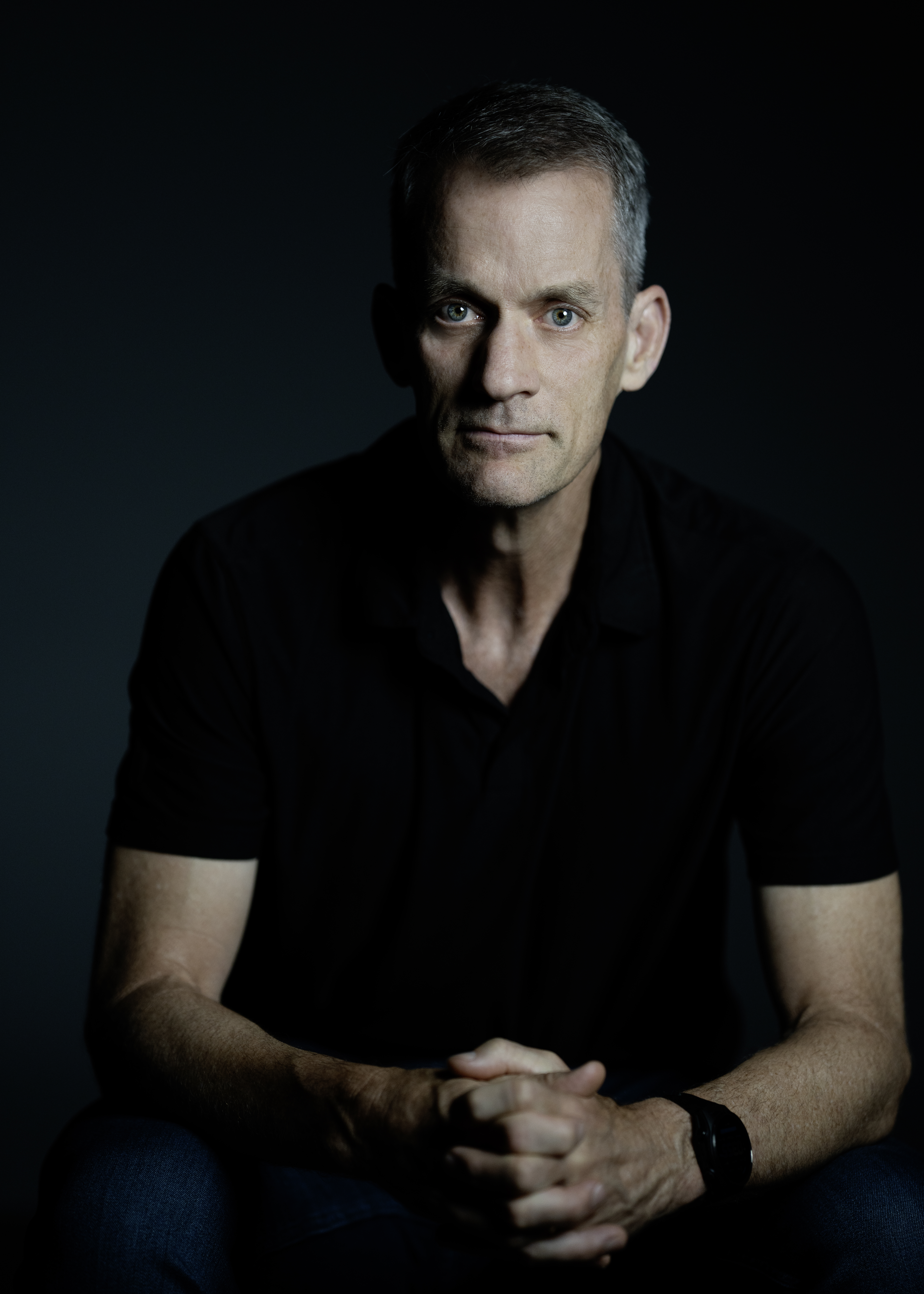
- Dean in 2025
- Born: July 23, 1968 (age 58); Hawaii
- Education: University of Minnesota, B.S. Computer Science and Engineering (1990); University of Washington, Ph.D. Computer Science (1996)
- Known for: MapReduce, Bigtable, Spanner, TensorFlow
- Scientific career
- Fields: Computer science
- Workplaces: Google, Digital Equipment Corporation
- Thesis: Whole-program optimization of object-oriented languages (1996)
- Doctoral advisor: Craig Chambers

Jeffrey Adgate Dean (born July 23, 1968) is an American computer scientist and software engineer. He is best known for his work at Google, which he joined in 1999. He led Google AI from 2018 to 2023 and was Google's chief scientist from 2023 to 2026. Dean co-founded the AI research start-up Discovery Loop in 2026.

== Education ==
Dean received a B.S., summa cum laude, from the University of Minnesota in computer science and economics in 1990. His undergraduate thesis was on neural networks in C programming, advised by Vipin Kumar.

He received a Ph.D. in computer science from the department that would become the Paul G. Allen School of Computer Science and Engineering at the University of Washington in 1996, working under Craig Chambers on compilers and whole-program optimization techniques for object-oriented programming languages. He was elected to the National Academy of Engineering in 2009, which recognized his work on "the science and engineering of large-scale distributed computer systems".

== Career ==
Before joining Google, Dean worked at DEC/Compaq's Western Research Laboratory, where he worked on profiling tools, microprocessor architecture and information retrieval. Much of his work was completed in close collaboration with Sanjay Ghemawat.

Before graduate school, he worked at the World Health Organization's Global Programme on AIDS, developing software for statistical modeling and forecasting of the HIV/AIDS pandemic.

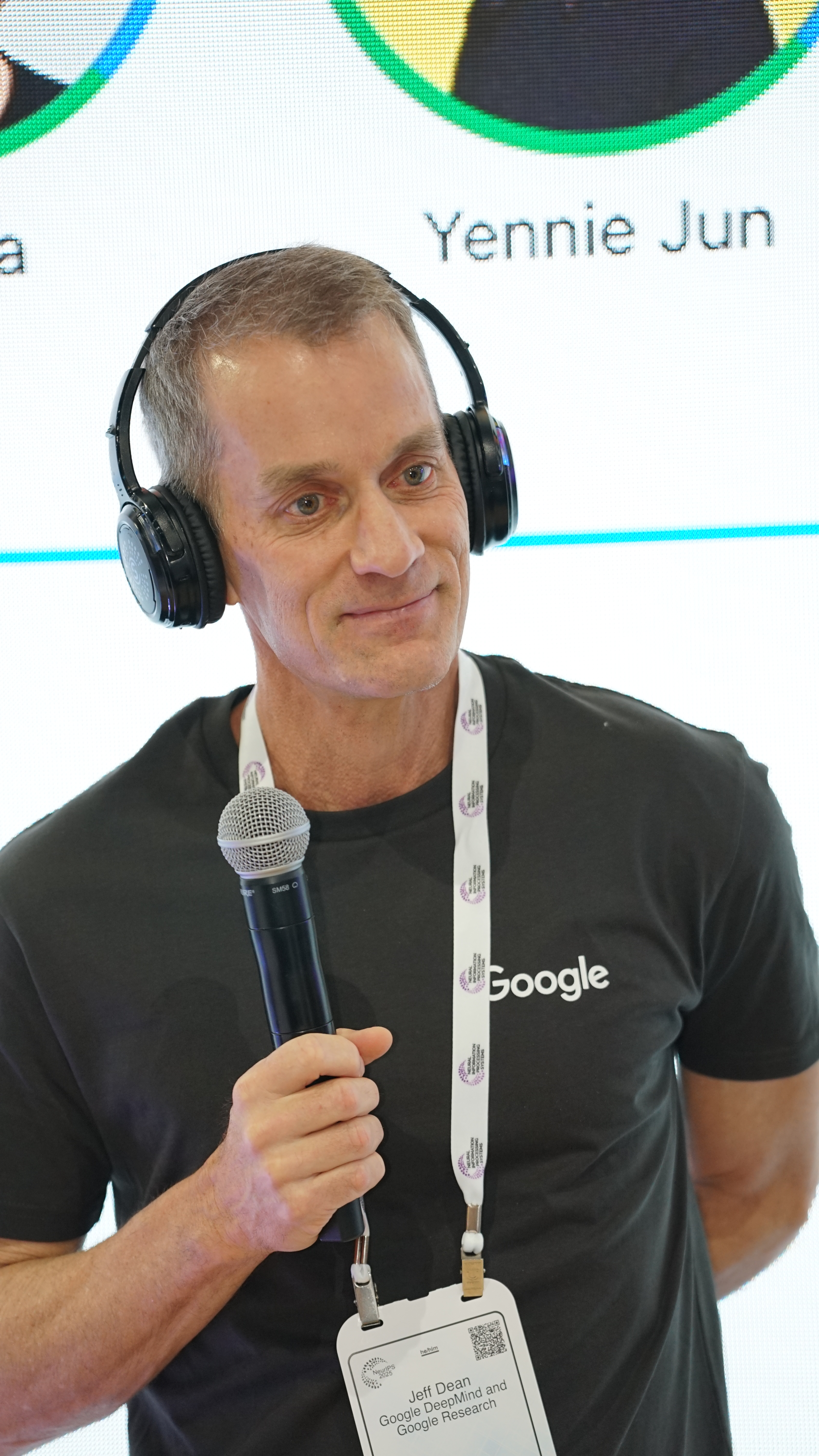
Dean in 2025

Dean joined Google in mid-1999. He joined Google X in 2011 to investigate deep neural networks, which had just resurged in popularity. This ended with "the cat neuron paper", a deep belief network trained by unsupervised learning on YouTube videos. This project morphed into Google Brain, also formed in 2011. Jeff Dean became its leader in 2012. In April 2018, he was appointed the head of Google's artificial intelligence division, after John Giannandrea left to lead Apple's AI projects. As of 2018, Dean and Sanjay Ghemawat were the only two employees at Google to hold the title of Senior Fellow, the highest technical level at the company.

While at Google, he designed and implemented large portions of the company's advertising, crawling, indexing and query serving systems, along with various pieces of the distributed computing infrastructure that underlies most of Google's products. At various times, he has also worked on improving search quality, statistical machine translation and internal software development tools and has had significant involvement in the engineering hiring process.

The projects Dean has worked on include:

- Original design of Protocol Buffers, an open-source data interchange format.
- Spanner, a scalable, multi-version, globally distributed, and synchronously replicated database
- Some of the production system design and statistical machine translation system for Google Translate
- Bigtable, a large-scale semi-structured storage system
- MapReduce, a system for large-scale data processing applications
- LevelDB, an open-source on-disk key-value store
- DistBelief, a proprietary machine-learning system for distributed training of deep neural networks. The "Belief" part is because it could be used to train deep belief networks. It was eventually refactored into TensorFlow. It was used to train the network in "the cat neuron paper".
- TensorFlow, an open-source machine-learning software library. He was the primary designer and implementor of the initial system.
- Pathways, an asynchronous distributed dataflow system for neural networks. It was used in PaLM.

He was an early member of Google Brain, a team that studies large-scale artificial neural networks, and he has headed artificial intelligence efforts since they were split from Google Search.

In 2023, DeepMind was merged with Google Brain to form a unified AI research unit, Google DeepMind. As part of this reorganization, Dean became Google's chief scientist.

Dean is also known as an angel investor, having invested in dozens of AI startups including Perplexity, Roboflow, Sakana AI and World Labs.

On 5 August 2026, Google announced that Dean would depart after almost 27 years. Alongside three other Google executives, he co-founded a startup called Discovery Loop that plans to use AI for research in fields like chip design, biology, drug discovery, and material design.

== Philanthropy ==
Dean and his wife, Heidi Hopper, started the Hopper-Dean Foundation and began making philanthropic grants in 2011. In 2016, the foundation gave $2 million each to UC Berkeley, Massachusetts Institute of Technology, University of Washington, Stanford University and Carnegie Mellon University to support programs that promote diversity in science, technology, engineering and mathematics (STEM).

== Personal life ==
Dean is married and has two daughters.

He is the subject of an Internet meme for "Jeff Dean facts". Similar to Chuck Norris facts, the Jeff Dean facts exaggerate his programming powers. For example:

Once, in early 2002, when the index servers went down, Jeff Dean answered user queries manually for two hours. Evals showed a quality improvement of 5 points.

== Awards and honors ==
- Elected to the National Academy of Engineering (2009)
- Fellow of the Association for Computing Machinery (2009)
- ACM SIGOPS Mark Weiser Award (2012)
- ACM Prize in Computing (2012)
- Fellow of the American Academy of Arts and Sciences (2016)
- Recipient of the IEEE John von Neumann Medal (2021)

== Major publications ==
- Jeffrey Dean and Sanjay Ghemawat. 2004. MapReduce: Simplified Data Processing on Large Clusters. OSDI'04: Sixth Symposium on Operating System Design and Implementation (December 2004)
- Fay Chang, Jeff Dean, Sanjay Ghemawat, Wilson C. Hsieh, Deborah A. Wallach, Mike Burrows, Tushar Chandra, Andrew Fikes, and Robert E. Gruber. 2006. Bigtable: A Distributed Storage System for Structured Data. OSDI'06: 7th Symposium on Operating System Design and Implementation (October 2006)
