= List of software reliability models =

Software reliability is the probability of the software causing a system failure over some specified operating time. Software does not fail due to wear out but does fail due to faulty functionality, timing, sequencing, data, and exception handling. The software fails as a function of operating time as opposed to calendar time. Many models have been developed since early 1970s, however, several of them have similar if not identical assumptions. The models have two basic types - prediction modeling and estimation modeling.

1.0 Overview of Software Reliability Prediction Models

These models are derived from actual historical data from real software projects. The user answers a list of questions which calibrate the historical data to yield a software reliability prediction. The accuracy of the prediction depends on how many parameters (questions) and datasets are in the model, how current the data is, and how confident the user is of their inputs. One of the earliest prediction models was the Rome Laboratory TR-92-52. It was developed in 1987 and last updated in 1992 and was geared towards software in avionics systems. The model wasn't updated after 1992. However, the Full-scale model was deployed in 1997 which reused many of the factors in the TR-92-52 model. New development factors were added to reflect new technologies and the empirical data included data from systems other than aircraft.

2.0 Overview of Software Reliability Growth (Estimation) Models

Software reliability growth (or estimation) models use failure data from testing to forecast the failure rate or MTBF into the future. The models depend on the assumptions about the fault rate during testing which can either be increasing, peaking, decreasing or some combination of decreasing and increasing. Some models assume that there is a finite and fixed number of inherent defects while others assume that it's infinite. Some models require effort for parameter estimation while others have only a few parameters to estimate. Some models require the exact time in between each failure found in testing, while others only need to have the number of failures found during any given time interval such as a day.

Model name	Inherent defect count	Effort required	Requires exact time between failures
Increasing fault rate			
Weibull	Finite/not fixed	High	NA
Peak			
Shooman Constant Defect Removal Rate Model	Finite/fixed	Low	Yes
Decreasing fault rate			
Shooman Constant Defect Removal Rate Model	Finite/fixed	Low	Yes
Linearly Decreasing
General exponential models including: · Goel-Okumoto (exponential) · Musa Basic Model · Jelinski-Moranda	Finite/fixed	Medium	Yes
Shooman Linearly Decreasing Model	Finite/fixed	Low	Yes
Duane	Infinite	Medium	No
Non-Linearly Decreasing
Musa-Okumoto (logarithmic)	Infinite	Low	Yes
Shooman Exponentially Decreasing Model	Finite/fixed	High	Yes
Log-logistic	Finite/fixed	High	Yes
Geometric	Infinite	High	Yes
Increasing and then decreasing			
Yamada (Delayed) S-shaped	Infinite	High	Yes
Weibull	Finite/not fixed	High	
