= Frans Kaashoek =

Dutch computer scientist (born 1965)

Marinus Frans (Frans) Kaashoek (born 1965, Leiden) is a Dutch computer scientist, entrepreneur, and Charles Piper Professor at the Massachusetts Institute of Technology.

== Biography ==
Kaashoek received his MA in 1988 and his Ph.D. degree in Computer Science in 1992 from the Vrije Universiteit under the supervision of Andy Tanenbaum for the thesis "Group communication in distributed computer systems."

In 1993 Kaashoek was appointed Charles Piper Professor in the Department of Electrical Engineering and Computer Science of the Massachusetts Institute of Technology. He is a member of the MIT Computer Science and Artificial Intelligence Laboratory's Parallel and Distributed Operating Systems group.

Kaashoek was one of a handful of researchers awarded the NSF National Young Investigator award in 1994 and the ACM-Infosys Foundation Award in 2010. In 2004 he was named an ACM Fellow, and in 2006 he was elected to be a member of the National Academy of Engineering for contributions to computer systems, distributed systems, and content-distribution networks. In 2012 he was elected to be a member of the American Academy of Arts and Sciences. He is also a recipient of the ACM SIGOPS Mark Weiser award and the 2010 ACM Prize in Computing.

== Work ==
Kaashoek's research interest are in the fields of operating systems, networking, programming languages, and computer architecture for distributed, mobile, and parallel systems. More recently this has included verification of systems.

In 1998 Kaashoek co-founded SightPath, a software company that developed software products for digital distribution. It was acquired by Cisco Systems in 2000. In the early 2000s Kaashoek assisted in the founding of Mazu Networks Inc. and served as board member until it was acquired by Riverbed Technology in 2009.

== Publications ==
- 1992. Group communication in distributed computer systems
- 2009. Principles of Computer System Design: An Introduction. With Jerome H. Saltzer.

Articles

- M. Frans Kaashoek, Robbert van Renesse, Hans van Staveren and Andrew S. Tanenbaum (1993). FLIP: an internetwork protocol for supporting distributed systems ACM Transactions on Computer Systems 11:73–106.
- David Mazières; M. Frans Kaashoek (September 1998). Escaping the Evils of Centralized Control with self-certifying pathnames (PostScript). Proceedings of the 8th ACM SIGOPS European workshop: Support for composing distributed applications. Sintra, Portugal: MIT.
- Stoica, I.; Morris, R.; Karger, D.; Kaashoek, M. F.; Balakrishnan, H. (2001). "Chord: A scalable peer-to-peer lookup service for internet applications" (PDF). ACM SIGCOMM Computer Communication Review. 31 (4): 149. doi:10.1145/964723.383071.
- David Andersen; Hari Balakrishnan; Frans Kaashoek; Robert Morris (December 2001). "Resilient overlay networks". Proceedings of the eighteenth ACM symposium on Operating systems principles. pp. 131–145. doi:10.1145/502034.502048. ISBN 978-1581133899. S2CID 221317942.
