= CHI Academy =

Computer science research award

The SIGCHI Academy is a group of researchers honored by SIGCHI, the Special Interest Group in Computer–Human Interaction of the Association for Computing Machinery. Each year, around ten new members are elected for having made a significant, cumulative contributions to the development of the field of human–computer interaction and have influenced the research of others.

== Inductees by year ==
Here are the inductees into the SIGCHI Academy by year:

| Year | New members |
|---|---|
| 2001 | Stuart Card, James D. Foley, Morten Kyng, Thomas P. Moran, Don Norman, Judith S. Olson, Ben Shneiderman |
| 2002 | Bill Buxton, John M. Carroll, Douglas Engelbart, Sara Kiesler, Thomas Landauer, Lucy Suchman |
| 2003 | Thomas Green, James D. Hollan, Robert E. Kraut, Gary M. Olson, Peter G. Polson |
| 2004 | George Furnas, Jonathan Grudin, William M. Newman, Brad A. Myers, Dan R. Olsen Jr., Brian Shackel, Terry Winograd |
| 2005 | Ronald Baecker, Susan Dumais, John Gould, Saul Greenberg, Bonnie E. John, Andrew Monk |
| 2006 | Michel Beaudouin-Lafon, Scott Hudson, Hiroshi Ishii, Jakob Nielsen, Peter Pirolli, George Robertson |
| 2007 | Joëlle Coutaz, Karen Holtzblatt, Gerhard Fischer, Robert J. K. Jacob, Jun Rekimoto, Christopher Schmandt |
| 2008 | Gregory Abowd, Paul Dourish, Wendy Kellogg, Randy Pausch, Mary Beth Rosson, Steve Whittaker |
| 2009 | Mark Ackerman, Bill Gaver, Clayton Lewis, Wendy Mackay, Aaron Marcus, Elizabeth Mynatt, Tom Rodden |
| 2010 | Susanne Bødker, Mary Czerwinski, Austin Henderson, David Kieras, Arnie Lund, Larry Tesler, Shumin Zhai |
| 2011 | Ravin Balakrishnan, Steven K. Feiner, Joseph Konstan, James Landay, Jenny Preece, Abigail Sellen, Dennis Wixon |
| 2012 | Ben Bederson, Steve Benford, Hugh Dubberly, Carl Gutwin, Joy Mountford, Alan Newell, Yvonne Rogers |
| 2013 | Patrick Baudisch, Victoria Bellotti, Alan Dix, Clarisse De Souza, Bonnie Nardi, Rebecca Grinter, Thomas Tullis, Eric Horvitz |
| 2014 | Susan M. Dray, W. Keith Edwards, Jodi Forlizzi, Richard H. R. Harper, Ken Hinckley, Jeff A. Johnson, Gary Marsden, John C. Tang |
| 2015 | Stephen Brewster, Andy Cockburn, Anind Dey, Ernest Edmonds, Scott MacKenzie, Sharon Oviatt, Catherine Plaisant, Bill Verplank |
| 2016 | Margaret Burnett, Elizabeth F. Churchill, Allison Druin, Susan R. Fussell, Yves Guiard, Leysia Palen, Daniel M. Russell, John Stasko |
| 2017 | Elisabeth André, Lorrie Faith Cranor, Vicki L. Hanson, Marti A. Hearst, Gloria Mark, Philippe Palanque, Paul Resnick, Thad Starner |
| 2018 | Amy S. Bruckman, Sheelagh Carpendale, Ed Chi, Michael Muller, Albrecht Schmidt, Jean Scholtz, Andrew D. Wilson, Volker Wulf |
| 2019 | George Fitzmaurice, Batya Friedman, Takeo Igarashi, Jennifer Mankoff, Nuria Oliver, Loren Terveen, Jacob O. Wobbrock, John Zimmerman |
| 2020 | Sunny Consolvo, Steven M. Drucker, Jean-Daniel Fekete, Jason Hong, Kristina Höök, Kasper Hornbæk, Meredith Ringel Morris, Peter Wright |
| 2021 | Maneesh Agrawala, Ann Blandford, Jeffrey Heer, Jonathan Lazar, Fabio Paternò, Rosalind Picard, Fernanda Viégas, Allison Woodruff |
| 2022 | Mark Billinghurst, Tanzeem Choudhury, Aniket Kittur, Amy J. Ko, Norbert Streitz, Jaime Teevan, Marilyn Tremaine, Roel Vertegaal |
| 2023 | Hrvoje Benko, Marc Hassenzahl, Steve Hodges, Cliff Lampe, Uichin Lee, Regan Mandryk, Florian "Floyd" Mueller, Phoebe Sengers |
| 2024 | Anna Cox, Shaowen Bardzell, Munmun De Choudhury, Hans Gellersen, Björn Hartmann, Gillian Hayes, Julie A. Kientz, Vassilis Kostakos, Shwetak Patel, Ryen W. White |
| 2025 | Carl DiSalvo, James Fogarty, Elizabeth Gerber, Wendy Ju, Pattie Maes, Joanna McGrenere, Antti Oulasvirta, Kate Starbird, Wolfgang Stuerzlinger, Kentaro Toyama, Martin M. Wattenberg |
| 2026 | Jeffrey Bigham, Laura Dabbish, Niklas Elmqvist, Darren Gergle, Kaj Grønbæk, Chris Harrison, Kori Inkpen, Katherine Isbister, Per Ola Kristensson, Joseph J. LaViola Jr., Eric Paulos |

== See also ==
- List of computer science awards
