= Yvonne Rogers =

British psychologist and computer scientist

Yvonne Rogers FRS
- Education: University of Wales (BA, PhD); University College London (MSc)
- Known for: Interaction Design
- Awards: ACM Fellow; Milner Award; CHI Academy; Honorary Doctorate from the University of St Gallen
- Scientific career
- Fields: Human-Computer Interaction; Interaction Design; Cognitive science
- Workplaces: University College London; Open University; Indiana University; Sussex University
- Thesis: Icon Design for the User Interface (1989)
- Website: www.yvonnerogers.com

Yvonne Rogers FRS is a British psychologist and computer scientist. She is a professor of Human-Computer Interaction at the Interaction Centre at University College London. She has authored or contributed to more than 350 publications. Her book Interaction Design: Beyond Human-Computer Interaction written with Jenny Preece and Helen Sharp (6th Edition, 2022) has sold more than 300,000 copies worldwide and has been translated into six other languages. Her work is described in Encounters with HCI Pioneers: A Personal History and Photo Journal.

== Early life ==
She earned a Bachelor of Arts degree in psychology from University of Wales in 1982, Master of Science degree ergonomics from University College London in 1983, and PhD in human-computer interaction from University of Wales in 1988.

== Career and research ==
Rogers served as a professor of school of Cognitive and Computing Sciences at Sussex University from 1992 to 2003, Professor in Informatics from 2003 to 2006 at Indiana University, and Professor of HCI at Open University from 2006 to 2011. She is professor and director of The University College London Interaction Centre at University College London. She was Principal Investigator and Co-Investigator of over 30 research grants from EPSRC, ESRC, AHRC, EU and NIH. She is known for her work on iconic interface to human-centre AI and a research agenda of user engagement in ubiquitous computing.

Rogers was a principal investigator for the ICRI project in collaboration with Intel. She led projects such as Visualising Mill Road, where they collected community data and visualized it as street art, and the Tidy Street project, visualising energy usage and efficiency from power meters. From 2000 to 2007, Rogers contributed to the UK Equator Project as a principal investigator, researching the relationship between physical and digital user experiences. One of the projects was "Ambient Wood", encouraging children to explore biological processes in a forest using wireless probes.

Rogers worked on a project using ambient light to nudge people to take the stairs rather than the elevator. She worked on the Lambent Shopping Trolly Project, building a lambent display that clips onto any shopping trolley to nudge buying decisions. Rogers worked on an augmented reality (AR) project to "try on" makeup and see how this AR influences buying decisions.

=== Awards and honours ===
- Fellow of the British Computer Society
- EPSRC dream fellowship
- Honorary Doctoral Degree of the University of St Gallen 2023
- SIGCHI Lifetime Research Award 2022
- Elected into SIGCHI CHI Academy 2012
- Osher Fellow 2015
- Milner Award 2022
- Fellow of the Royal Society 2022

=== Books ===
Her publications include:

- Preece, Jenny; Rogers, Yvonne; Sharp, Helen (26 May 2015). Interaction Design: Beyond Human-Computer Interaction. John Wiley & Sons. ISBN 978-1-119-02075-2.
- Rogers, Yvonne (28 May 2012). Hci Theory: Classical, Modern, and Contemporary. Morgan & Claypool. ISBN 978-1-68173-229-9.
- Rogers, Yvonne; Marshall, Paul (4 April 2017). Research in the Wild. Morgan & Claypool Publishers. ISBN 978-1-62705-878-0.

=== Papers ===
- Yvonne Rogers, Judi Ellis, Distributed cognition: an alternative framework for analysing and explaining collaborative working, (1994), Journal of Information Technology
- Michael Scaife, Yvonne Rogers, External cognition: how do graphical representations work?, (1996), International Journal of Human-Computer Studies
- Yvonne Rogers, Antonio Rizzo, Mike Scaife, Interdisciplinarity: an Emergent or Engineered Process?, (2003), University of Sussex
- Michael Scaife, Yvonne Rogers, Frances Aldrich, Matt Davies, Designing for or designing with? Informant design for interactive learning environments, (2006), CHI '97 Proceedings of the ACM SIGCHI Conference on Human factors in computing systems
- Yvonne Rogers, Moving on from Weiser's Vision of Calm Computing: Engaging UbiComp Experiences, (2006), International Conference on Ubiquitous Computing
- Richard Harper, Tom Rodden, Yvonne Rogers, Abigail Sellen, Human-Computer Interaction in the Year 2020, (2008), Microsoft Research
