= Albrecht Schmidt =

Albrecht Schmidt is the name of:

- Albrecht Schmidt (computer scientist) (born 1970), computer scientist
- Albrecht Schmidt (actor) (born 1870), Danish actor
