= Dillahunt =

Dillahunt is a surname. Notable people with the surname include:

- Ellis Dillahunt (born 1964), American football player
- Garret Dillahunt (born 1964), American actor
- Tawanna Dillahunt, American computer scientist
