= Susan R. Fussell =

American psychologist

Susan Runyon Fussell is an American psychologist, communications researcher, and information scientist known for her contributions to human–computer interaction. She is Liberty Hyde Baily Professor of Communication and Information Science at Cornell University, and a member of the CHI Academy.

== Education and career ==
Fussell graduated from Tufts University in 1981, with a bachelor's degree in psychology and sociology. She went to Columbia University for graduate study in social and cognitive psychology, earning a master's degree there in 1983 and completing her Ph.D. in 1990. Her dissertation, The Coordination of Knowledge in Communication: People's Assumptions about Others' Knowledge and Their Effects on Referential Communication, was supervised by Robert M. Krauss.

While doing her graduate studies, Fussell also worked at Bell Labs from 1987 to 1988. After postdoctoral research at Princeton University, she became an assistant professor at Mississippi State University in 1993, but returned to industry as a researcher at Bell Communications Research in 1995. She worked as a scientist and later a research professor at Carnegie Mellon University from 1997 to 2008, when she moved to Cornell. She has also been a program director at the National Science Foundation from 2010 to 2012, and director of graduate studies in communication at Cornell since 2013.

== Recognition ==
Fussell was elected to the CHI Academy in 2016. She was co-chair of the 2017 Conference on Human Factors in Computing Systems with Gloria Mark, and became Liberty Hyde Baily Professor at Cornell in 2018.
