= Gaver =

Gaver is a surname. Notable people with the surname include:

- Bill Gaver, American academic
- John M. Gaver, Jr. (1940–2002), American thoroughbred racehorse trainer, son of John Sr.
- John M. Gaver, Sr. (1900–1982), American thoroughbred racehorse trainer
- Mary Virginia Gaver (1906–1991), American librarian
