= Drucker =

Drucker (/ˈdrʌkər/; German: [ˈdʁʊkɐ]) is an occupational surname of German and Dutch origin. Notable people and characters with the surname include:

== People ==
- Adam Drucker (born 1977), American rapper and poet, known by the stage name Doseone
- Adolphus Drucker (1868–1903), Dutch-born English politician
- Amy Drucker (1873–1951), British artist
- Daniel C. Drucker (1918–2001), American engineer and academic
- Daniel J. Drucker (born 1956), Canadian endocrinologist
- Ernest Drucker (1940–2025), American public health researcher
- Gerald Drucker (1925–2010), British bassist and photographer
- Henry Drucker (1942–2002), American political scientist and university fundraiser, based in Britain
- Iosif Druker (1822–1879), Russian violin virtuoso, known as Stempenyu
- Itzhak Drucker (born 1947), Israeli footballer
- Jason Drucker (born 2005), American child actor
- Léa Drucker (born 1972), French actress
- Leon Drucker (born 1961), American bassist, known as Lee Rocker, son of Stanley
- Leopold Drucker (1903–1988), Austrian footballer and coach
- Linda Ryke-Drucker, American poker player
- Hendrik Lodewijk Drucker (1857–1917), Dutch politician
- Jason Drucker (born 2005), American child actor
- Jean Drucker (1941–2003), French television executive
- Jempy Drucker (born 1986), Luxembourgish racing cyclist
- Jim Drucker (born 1952), American sports commissioner
- Johanna Drucker (born 1952), American visual theorist and author
- Malka Drucker (born 1945), American rabbi and author
- Marie Drucker (born 1974), French journalist and author, daughter of Jean
- Michel Drucker (born 1942), French journalist, brother of Jean
- Mike Drucker (born 1984), American comedian, writer, and producer
- Mort Drucker (1929–2020), American cartoonist and caricaturist
- Norm Drucker (1920–2015), American basketball referee
- Paul Drucker (born 1945), American politician
- Peter Drucker (1909–2005), Austrian author and economist
- Philip Drucker (1911–1982), American anthropologist
- Raviv Drucker (born 1970), Israeli journalist, brother of Sharon
- Renate Drucker (1917–2009), German archivist
- René Drucker Colín (1937–2017), Mexican neuroscientist and journalist
- Sharon Drucker (born 1967), Israeli basketball coach, brother of Raviv
- Stanley Drucker (1929–2022), American clarinetist, father of Leon
- Steven M. Drucker, American computer scientist
- Tomáš Drucker (born 1978), Slovak politician
- Wilhelmina Drucker (1847–1925), Dutch feminist and writer
- Zackary Drucker (born 1983), American director, actress, and trans activist

== Fictional characters ==
- Sam Drucker, proprietor of Drucker's Store in the CBS TV shows Petticoat Junction and Green Acres

== See also ==
- Drucker School of Management, business college of Claremont Graduate University in Claremont, California, United States
- Druckers Vienna Patisserie, chain of pâtisserie bakeries in the United Kingdom
