= Susanne Bødker =

Danish computer scientist

Susanne Bødker (born 1956) is a Danish computer scientist known for her contributions to human–computer interaction, computer-supported cooperative work, and participatory design, including the introduction of activity theory to human–computer interaction. She is a professor of computer science at Aarhus University, a member of the CHI Academy as well as an ACM Fellow.

Bødker is the author of Through the Interface: A Human Activity Approach To User Interface Design (Taylor & Francis, 1990), based on her dissertation work in 1987. It discusses human-computer interaction, and the role of user interfaces from the perspective of activity theory. Human-computer interaction conducted in purposeful human work is in focus. It focuses on the idea that as a user, you do not simply operate on a computer application but operate through onto other objects/subjects.

== Education ==
Bødker was a visiting researcher at Xerox PARC for 1982–1983. She earned a Ph.D. at Aarhus University in 1987, with a dissertation Brugergrænseflader – hvordan skal vi forstå dem og deres brug, og hvordan skal vi designe dem supervised by Morten Kyng. Her PhD thesis was published by Erlbaum under the title "Through the interface-A human activity approach to user interface design". She completed her habilitation (Dr. Scient.) in 1999 at Aarhus; her habilitation thesis, Computer Applications as Mediators of Design and Use, with opponents Christiane Floyd and Markku Nurminen.

== UTOPIA Project ==
Bødker was a researcher on the UTOPIA (in Danish, Uddannelse, teknik og produkt i arbejdskvalitetsperspektiv, which translates to training, technology and product in work quality perspective) Project from 1981 to 1985, which was initiated by the Nordic Graphic Union. Originally, the UTOPIA methodology sought to involve users in all aspects of design and development of technologies to be used in their jobs. With the subsequent advent of computer graphics workstations, UTOPIA's goal was to develop tools that leveraged and developed users’ existing graphics skills. Attempts to explain the emerging WYSIWYG (what you see is what you get) technology to graphic workers were unsuccessful. The users, who were accustomed to using code, could not conceptualize how a system could work without code. In response to this exchange, the team implemented the use of low-fidelity prototypes to convey the concept and for design development. This important outcome of the project provided methods that are now integral in human-computer interaction (HCI), computer-supported cooperative work (CSCW), consensus participation, contextual design, and cooperative inquiry. The concept of the UTOPIA project was heavily influenced by Kristen Nygaard. These efforts would lead to Bødker's later work in cooperative design and participatory design.

== Awards ==
In 2008, the Special Interest Group on Design of Communication of the Association for Computing Machinery gave Bødker their Rigo Award for "lifetime contribution to the field of communication design". The award cited Bødker "for her contributions to participatory design, computer-supported cooperative work and human–computer interaction". Bødker was elected to the CHI Academy in 2010 and won the ACM SigCHI Lifetime Research Award in 2024. In 2015 she won the lifetime achievement award of the European Society for Socially Embedded Technologies (EUSSET) and the International Institute for Socio-Informatics (IISI). She won the Pioneer award of the International Federation for Information Processing Technical Committee on Human–Computer Interaction (IFIP TC13) in 2016.

Bødker was named as an ACM Fellow, in the 2024 class of fellows, "for contributions to participatory design, computer-supported collaborative work, and human-computer interaction".

== Selected publications ==
- Bødker, Susanne; Grønbæk, Kaj (1991-03-01). "Cooperative prototyping: users and designers in mutual activity". International Journal of Man-Machine Studies. Computer-supported Cooperative Work and Groupware. Part 2. 34 (3): 453–478. doi:10.1016/0020-7373(91)90030-B. ISSN 0020-7373.
- Bannon, Liam J.; Bødker, Susanne (1991), Carroll, John M., ed., Designing Interaction, Cambridge University Press, pp. 227–253, ISBN 9780521400565
- Bannon, Liam; Bødker, Susanne (1997), Hughes, John A.; Prinz, Wolfgang; Rodden, Tom; Schmidt, Kjeld, eds., "Constructing Common Information Spaces", Proceedings of the Fifth European Conference on Computer Supported Cooperative Work, Springer Netherlands, pp. 81–96, doi:10.1007/978-94-015-7372-6_6, ISBN 9789401573726
- Bødker, S. (2000-09-01). "Scenarios in user-centred design—setting the stage for reflection and action". Interacting with Computers. 13 (1): 61–75. doi:10.1016/S0953-5438(00)00024-2. ISSN 0953-5438.
- Bødker, S., Ehn, P., Sjögren, D., & Sundblad, Y. (2000). Cooperative design perspectives on 20 years with "the Scandinavian IT Design Model". In Proceedings of the first Nordic conference on Human-computer interaction Association for Computing Machinery.
- Bødker, Susanne; Iversen, Ole Sejer (2002). "Staging a Professional Participatory Design Practice: Moving PD Beyond the Initial Fascination of User Involvement". Proceedings of the Second Nordic Conference on Human-computer Interaction. NordiCHI '02. New York, NY, USA: ACM: 11–18. doi:10.1145/572020.572023. ISBN 9781581136166.
- Bertelsen, Olav W.; Bødker, Susanne (2003). "Activity theory". Hci Models, Theories, and Frameworks: 291–324. doi:10.1016/B978-155860808-5/50011-3.
- Bødker, Susanne; Andersen, Peter Bøgh (2005–12). "Complex Mediation". Hum.-Comput. Interact. 20 (4): 353–402. doi:10.1207/s15327051hci2004_1. ISSN 0737-0024.
- Bødker, Susanne (2006). "When Second Wave HCI Meets Third Wave Challenges". Proceedings of the 4th Nordic Conference on Human-computer Interaction: Changing Roles. NordiCHI '06. New York, NY, USA: ACM: 1–8. doi:10.1145/1182475.1182476. ISBN 9781595933256.
- Bødker, Susanne; Klokmose, Clemens N. (2011) "The Human–Artifact Model: An Activity Theoretical Approach to Artifact Ecologies". Human–Computer Interaction, 26:4, 315–371, doi:10.1080/07370024.2011.626709
- Bødker, Susanne; Kyng, Morten (2018–2). "Participatory Design That Matters—Facing the Big Issues". ACM Trans. Comput.-Hum. Interact. 25 (1): 4:1–4:31. doi:10.1145/3152421. ISSN 1073–0516.
- Bødker, S. (1987). Through the Interface – a Human Activity Approach to User Interface Design. DAIMI Report Series, 16(224). https://doi.org/10.7146/dpb.v16i224.7586.
- Schuler, Douglas, and Aki Namioka, eds. Participatory design: Principles and practices. CRC Press, 1993. https://doi.org/10.1201/9780203744338.
