= Jonathan Grudin =

American computer scientist

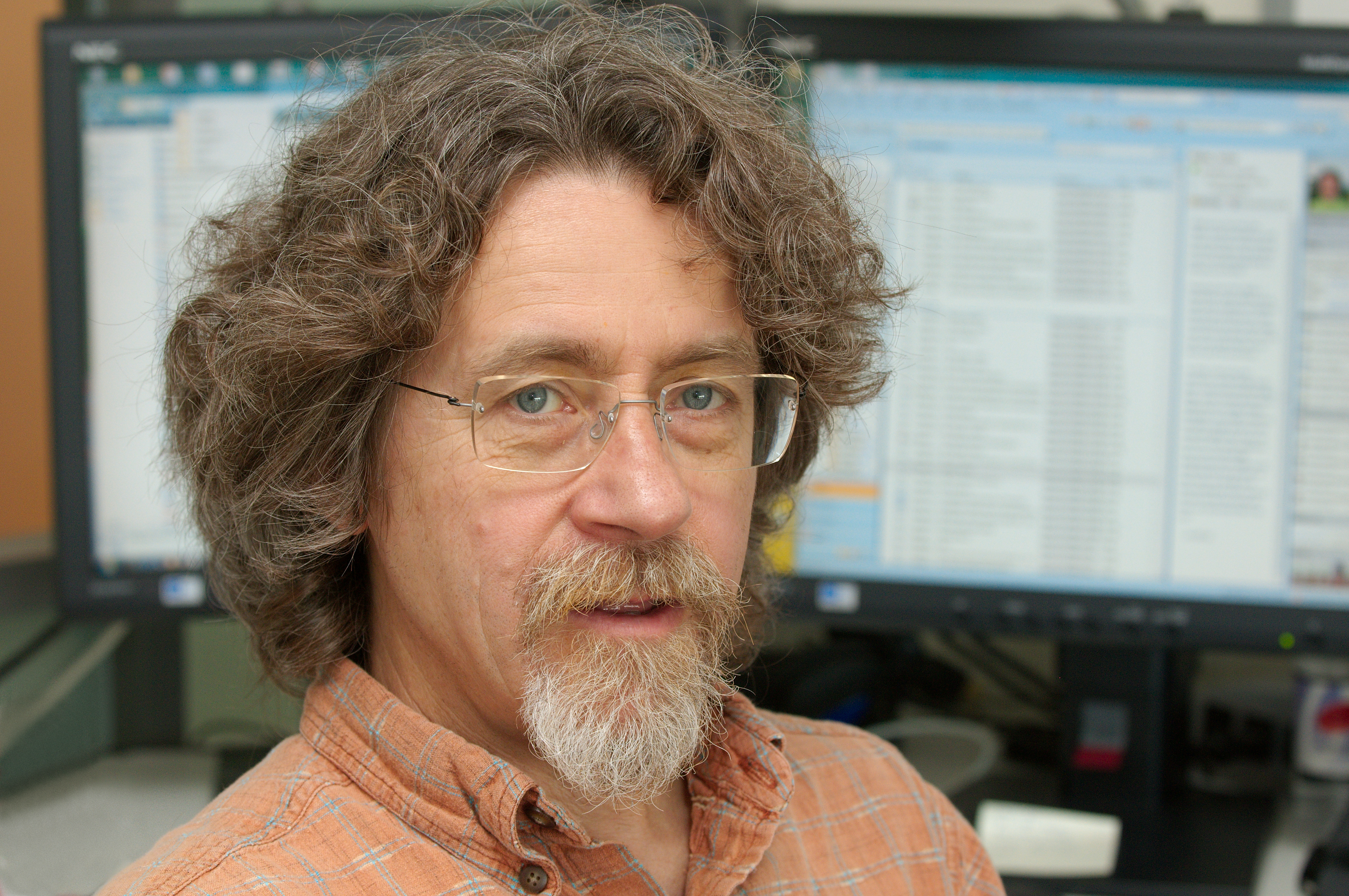
- Grudin at Microsoft Research in 2009
- Born: December 31, 1949 (age 76); Boulder, Colorado
- Education: Reed College; Purdue University; University of California, San Diego
- Known for: Grudin number Grudin Paradox
- Awards: Association for Computing Machinery SIGCHI CHI Academy; Association for Computing Machinery Fellow; CSCW Lasting Impact Award
- Scientific career
- Fields: Human-computer interaction Computer-supported cooperative work
- Workplaces: Microsoft Research; University of Washington Information School; University of California, Irvine; Wang Laboratories; Aarhus University; Microelectronics and Computer Technology Corporation
- Doctoral advisor: Donald Norman
- Doctoral students: Rebecca Grinter; Leysia Palen

Jonathan Grudin (born December 31, 1949) was a researcher at Microsoft from 1998 to 2022 and is affiliate professor at the University of Washington Information School working in the fields of human-computer interaction and computer-supported cooperative work. Grudin is a pioneer of the field of computer-supported cooperative work and one of its most prolific contributors. His collaboration distance to other researchers of human-computer interactions has been described by the "Grudin number". Grudin is also well known for the "Grudin Paradox" or "Grudin Problem", which states basically with respect to the design of collaborative software for organizational settings, "What may be in the managers' best interests may not be in the interests of individual contributors, and therefore not used." He was awarded the inaugural CSCW Lasting Impact Award in 2014 on the basis of this work. He has also written about the publication culture and history of human-computer interactions.

== Career ==
Prior to working at Microsoft Research, Grudin was a professor of information and computer science at the University of California, Irvine from 1991 to 1998. His career has spanned numerous institutions. He worked at Wang Laboratories as a software engineer (1974–1975 and 1983–1986). He was a visiting scientist in the Psychology and Artificial Intelligence Laboratories at MIT (1976–1979) and a NATO Postdoctoral Fellow at the Medical Research Council's Applied Psychology Unit (now known as the Cognition and Brain Sciences Unit (1982–1983)). From 1986 to 1989 he worked at the Microelectronics and Computer Technology Corporation, then took a series of faculty positions (including visiting professorships) at Aarhus University (1989–1991), the University of California, Irvine (1991–1998), Keio University (1995) and the University of Oslo (1997).

From 1997 to 2003, he was editor-in-chief of ACM Transactions on Computer-Human Interaction, one of the most prestigious journals in the field of human-computer interaction. Grudin was inducted into the selective Association for Computing Machinery SIGCHI CHI Academy in 2004. In 2012, he was made an Association for Computing Machinery Fellow for "contributions to human computer interaction with an emphasis on computer supported cooperative work." He holds a B.A. in mathematics and physics from Reed College (1972), a M.S. in mathematics from Purdue University, and a Ph.D. in cognitive psychology from the University of California, San Diego (1981), where he was advised by Donald Norman.

His book From Tool to Partner, The Evolution of Human-Computer Interaction was published in 2017.
