= MobileHCI =

- Abbreviation: MobileHCI
- Discipline: Human-computer interaction, Mobile devices, Mobile Interaction

Publication details
- Publisher: ACM SIGCHI
- History: 1998–Present
- Frequency: annual

Logo of MobileHCI 2010

The Conference on Mobile Human-Computer Interaction (MobileHCI) is a series of academic conferences in Human–computer interaction and is sponsored by ACM SIGCHI, a Special Interest Group on Computer-Human Interaction. MobileHCI has been held annually since 1998 and has been an ACM SIGCHI sponsored conference since 2012

== History ==
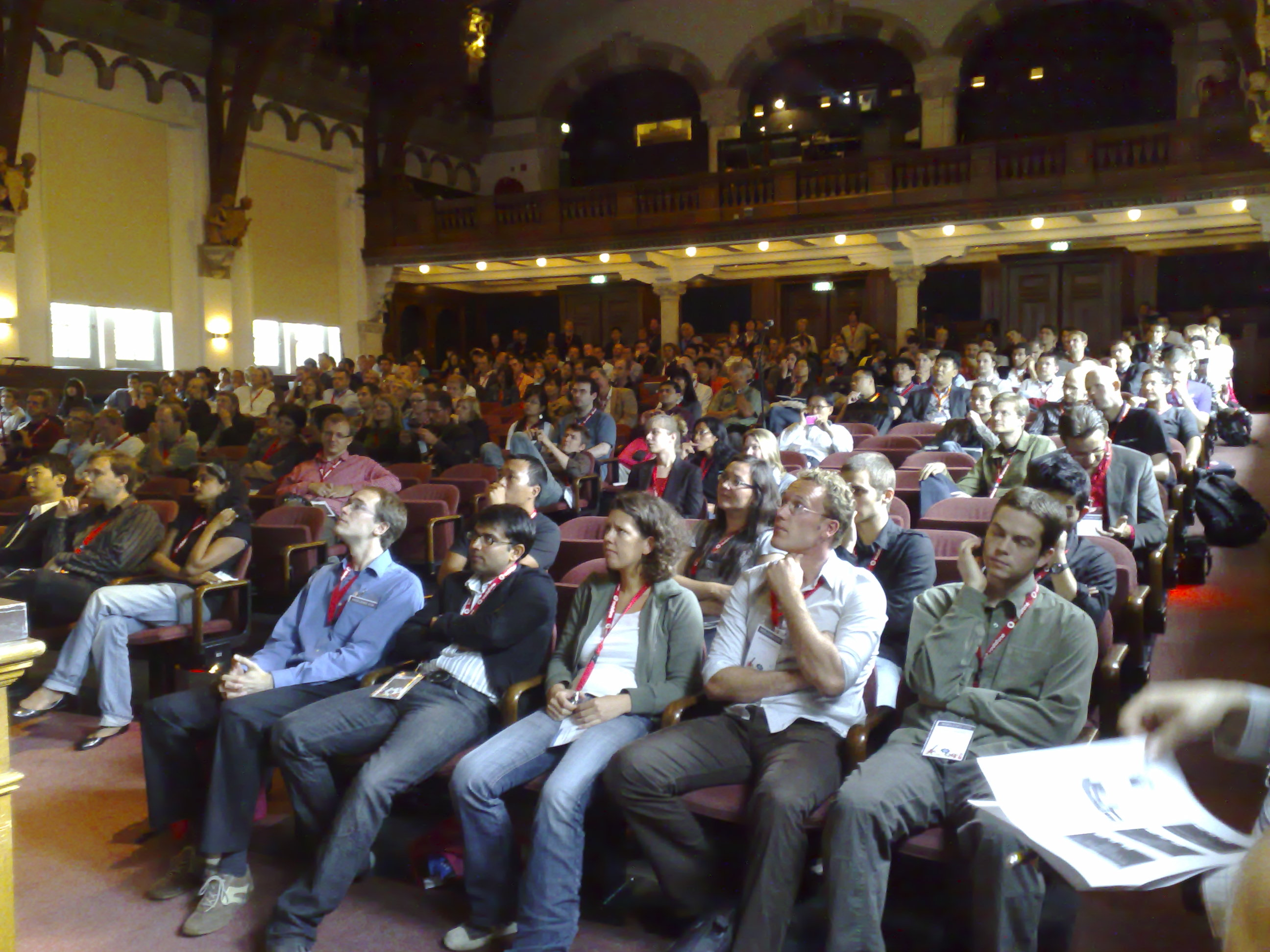
Audience in the main hall of MobileHCI 2008.

The MobileHCI series started in 1998 as a stand-alone Workshop on Human Computer Interaction with Mobile Devices held at the University of Glasgow. In the following year the workshop was held in conjunction with the Interact conference.

In 2002, MobileHCI was held independently from an associated conference as a stand-alone symposium in Pisa, Italy. In 2003 the conference was held in Udine, Italy. In 2004 it was held at the University of Strathclyde. In the following years the conference took place in Austria, Finland, and Singapore.

For 2008 the conference's steering committee agreed to award a prize for the most influential paper published at MobileHCI ten years ago. The prize recognises the longevity of impact papers from the first MobileHCI have had on the research community. The 2008 prize was awarded to Keith Cheverst for the paper Exploiting Context in HCI Design for Mobile Systems written together with Tom Rodden, Nigel Davies, and Alan Dix.

MobileHCI 2009 was held by Fraunhofer FIT and University of Siegen, in cooperation with ACM SIGCHI and ACM SIGMOBILE. The 2009 prize for the most influential paper from ten years ago was awarded to Albrecht Schmidt for his paper Implicit human-computer interaction through context.

The 12th MobileHCI took place in Lisboa, Portugal, from September 7–10, 2010. The theme of the conference was a mobile world for all.

MobileHCI 2011 took place in Stockholm, Sweden from 30 August to 2 September 2011. The Most influential Paper from MobileHCI 2001 prize was awarded to Simon Holland for his paper AudioGPS: Spatial Audio Navigation with a Minimal Attention Interface.

In 2018, the conference's steering committee agreed to award a prize for the most impactful paper published at MobileHCI in the 20 years conference series ("Impact Award") to the paper by Matthias Böhmer, Brent Hecht, Johannes Schöning, Antonio Krüger and Gernot Bauer on mobile application usage. In 2021, the same paper was honoured with the "Most Influential Paper Award" for the recent 10 years of the conference series.

In 2020, the conference's steering committee agreed to change the name of MobileHCI from Conference on Human-Computer Interaction with Mobile Devices and Services to Conference on Mobile Human-Computer Interaction to reflect the societal and technological transition where mobility has become pervasive and prime to our lives.
