= Daniel M. Russell =

American computer scientist

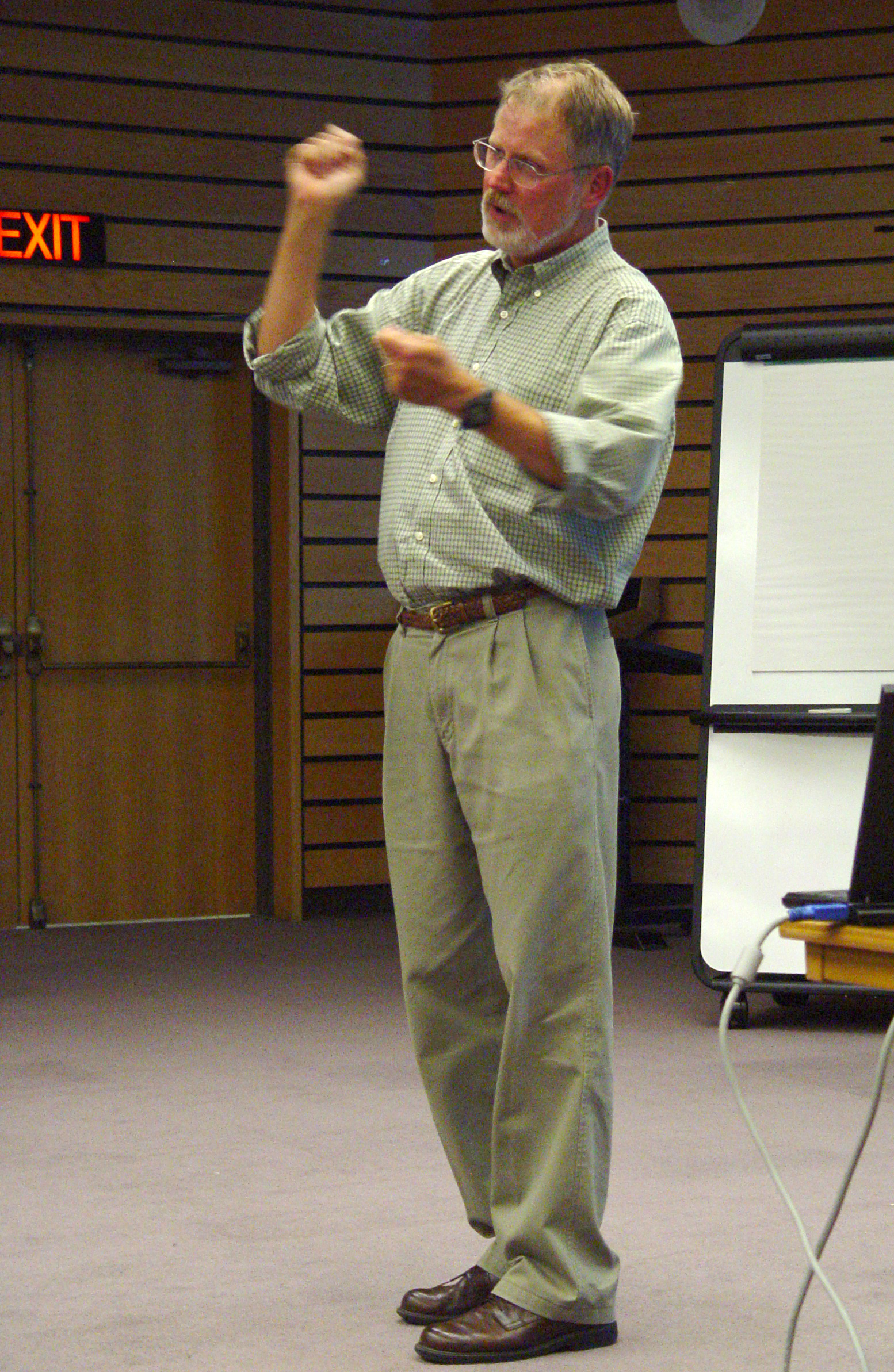
- Russell in 2006
- Education: University of Rochester
- Website: sites.google.com/site/dmrussell/

Daniel M. Russell is an American computer scientist.

== Education ==
Russell graduated from University of California at Irvine with a B.S. in Information and Computer Science (1977). He received his M.S (1979) and Ph.D. (1985) in Computer Science from University of Rochester. His doctoral work was titled "Schema-Based Problem Solving" which was based on "using recombinations of pre-stored plans in sophisticated ways". While at University of Rochester, Russell did research work in "the neuropsychology of laterality, models of apraxia and aphasia, coordinated motor movements and computer vision".

== Career ==
Russell joined Xerox Corporation in 1981 where he worked as a consultant at the Webster Research Center in New York. Russell then became a research associate where he engaged in AI research and the development of Interlisp-D courses. In 1982, he joined the research staff at PARC. Until 1991, he led a project called "Instructional Design Environment" (IDE) with Richard Burton and Thomas P. Moran to "develop a practical computer-aided design and analysis system for use in ill-structured design tasks". He then worked in the User Interface Research group, led by Stuart Card, which studied the uses of information visualization techniques.

Russell worked at Apple in the Advanced Technology Group sector from 1993 to 1997. He managed research within the User Experience Research Group which studied issues of sensemaking, cognitive modelling of analysis tasks, synchronous and asynchronous collaboration, shared awareness of individual state, joint work coordination, and knowledge-based use of complex, heterogenous information. Alongside his research, he developed applications such as Knowbots and AI planner-based assistants for Macintosh OS. Russell subsequently became the director of the Knowledge Management Technologies laboratory where he led the research efforts in five areas: Intelligent Systems, Spoken Language, User Experience, Interaction Design, and Information Technology. As Director, Russell also worked alongside the Apple CEO Tim Cook and founder Steve Jobs in corporation on Network Computing.

Russell was an adjunct lecturer on the Engineering and Computer Science faculty of the University of Santa Clara (1998), and has taught special topics classes in Artificial Intelligence at Stanford University (1994).

Russell returned to Xerox in 1997 where he worked as a manager in the User Experience Research area through 2000. From 1998 to 1999, Russell led the Madcap project, a system to capture, organize and render large amounts of complex presentation materials into an understandable whole. The project is implemented in Java and QuickTime.

Russell joined IBM in 2000, where he managed a research group in the User Sciences and Experience Research (USER) lab at the IBM Almaden Research Center. He subsequently became a senior manager where he led larger research groups in areas covering user experience design of large systems. Until 2005, he engaged in understanding sensemaking behaviour of people dealing with mass information collection. He has also contributed in the design and use case studies in the BlueBoard system as a collaboration tool. BlueBoard is a large interactive system and display surface for collaboration whose primary goal was to support quick information access and sharing through shoulder-to-shoulder collaboration. The tool was also used to explore computer interfaces in public spaces. The project's success led it to be installed in the main lobby of the IBM Watson Research Lab as well as the boardroom of IBM CEO Lou Gerstner per his request.

Russell worked at Google from 2005 until 2023, where he was a senior research scientist and lead for the research area of "Search Quality & User Happiness". He coordinated the development of two Massive Open Online Courses (MOOC) on effective searching skills which were launched in 2012 on PowerSearchingWithGoogle.com, which had more than 3 million students. In September 2019, MIT Press and Dr. Russell tweeted that 4.4M people have taken Power Searching with Google MOOC

He also led a Search Education team that developed A-Google-Day, launched April 11, 2011, a large-scale teaching system in which users can practice their searching skills with Google. The software package for it was later re-packaged and offered on Google's Course Builder.

Russell has also given commencement address, lectures and keynote conferences about different topics in Academy.

Russell investigates how users search on the internet and mentioned in an interview: "One statistic blew my mind. 90 percent of people in their studies don't know how to use CTRL/Command + F to find a word in a document or web page!". He creates videos ("1 Minute Morceaux" on his YouTube Channel) with which he wants to improve web literacy.

In 2019, Russell wrote an article for Scientific American called How to Be a Better Web Searcher: Secrets from Google Scientists, together with Mario Callegaro and published the book The Joy of Search: A Google Insider's Guide. It received generally favorable reviews. He teaches on the subject of effective web-search strategies, using large-scale teaching systems developed by him at Google. Russell sometimes refers to himself as a search anthropologist for his focus on user experience in web search and improving sensemaking of information with technology. Russell is also a Resident Futurist at University of Maryland, where he works for the Office of the vice-president for Research.

Russell has held research positions with IBM (as a senior research scientist, and briefly at a startup that developed tablet computers a few years before the iPad. ), Apple Inc. (where he wrote the first 100 web pages for www.Apple.com using SimpleText.) and Xerox over the course of his career.

In 2023, Daniel Russell was laid off from Google as a part of its larger lay off of 12,000 employees.

== Research ==
Russell's research focus has been human experience with search engines and in large, complex collections of information. He aims to design comprehensible and intuitive ways for users to engage with information effectively. Particular topics include the design of information experience; sensemaking; intelligent agents; knowledge-based assistance; information visualization; multimedia documents; advanced design and development environments; design rationale; planning; intelligent tutoring; hypermedia; and human–computer interfaces.

While developing AI technology at Xerox PARC, Russell realized that sophisticated technology was useless if people did not intuitively know how to use it. This motivated him to shift his focus to the sciences of user experience.

In 2011, Russell taught effective searching skills and enhancing learning efficacy. Russell also investigated new approaches to dealing with the growing amount of available information.

== Authored publications and cited works ==
Russell's authored publications in topics including education innovation, human–computer interaction and visualization, information retrieval and the web, and mobile systems can be found on the Google AI website. His works are widely cited by other authors.

== Personal life ==
Russell blogs on effective searching skills as well as his own investigations in sensemaking and information foraging.

Russell started writing his blog, SearchResearch, in 2010.

On October 23, 2013, Russell appeared on Lifehacker's "The How I Work series", interviewed by Tessa Miller. On it, Russell describes a day in his life, how he works and some personal topics

On August 9, 2017, his blog arrived to the first 1,000 posts.

== Awards ==
Russell was inducted into the CHI Academy (ACM) in 2016. He was added to the UC Irvine Information & Computer Science Department Hall of Fame in 2015. In 2013, Russell received the UC Irvine Bren School's 2013 Lauds & Laurels Distinguished Alumnus award.
