= Bill Gaver =

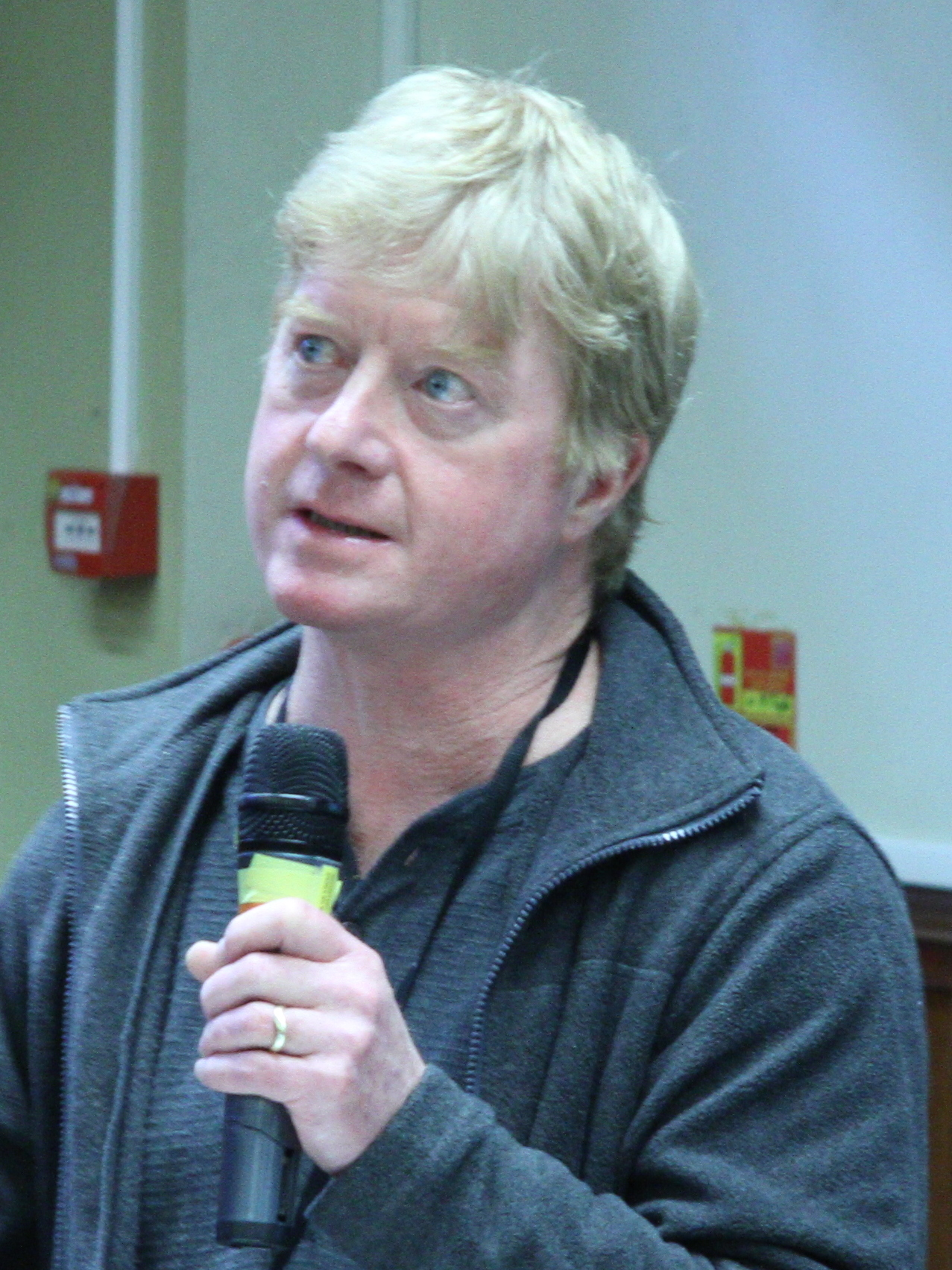
Gaver in 2013

William Gaver is a co-director of the Interaction Research Studio at the Northumbria University now. as well as a Professor of Design Department at Goldsmiths, University of London since 2005.

== Education ==
Gaver received his Ph.D at University of California, San Diego for Psychology and Cognitive Science.

== Career ==
Previously Gaver was a research scientist at Apple Inc from 1987 to 1988.

After his brief career at Apple, he taught at Royal College of Art, London from 1994 to 2004 as a Professor of Interaction Research, where he researched methods to use technology for social and cultural interventions.

Then from 2000 to 2007, he co-founded Equator IRC. Funded by the Engineering and Physical Sciences Research Council (EPSRC), the project investigated the integration of the physical with the digital world by drawing together approaches from social science, cognitive science and art and design. In particular, the project conducted research to seek relationship between these two concept using modern age digital devices in order to improve the quality of everyday life. The project initially relied on cultural probes, a design driven research technique contributed by Gaver which helps to uncover people’s lifestyle, values, activities, opinions and so on.

Along with Interaction Research Studio, he is currently in process of developing approaches to help assess people’s experience with designs using cultural probes as well as documentary films. In his approach, he utilizes specialized cameras and audio recorders to analyze users’ experience to answer ambiguity, interpretation as well as design-led research. Ultimately, by creating it as an open-sourced, their goal is to build a resource for designers and researchers to utilize in their own studies

He is an elected member of the CHI Academy and so far he has published over 70 articles on research techniques, design and implementation of batch deployment, human computer interaction (HCI) and other topics.
