= Rebecca Grinter =

American computer scientist

Rebecca Elizabeth Grinter
- Born: Norwich, England
- Citizenship: American
- Education: University of Leeds; University of California, Irvine
- Scientific career
- Fields: Human-computer interaction, CSCW
- Workplaces: Bell Labs; PARC; Georgia Tech; GVU Center
- Doctoral advisor: Jonathan Grudin
- Notable students: Andrea Grimes Parker

Rebecca Elizabeth "Beki" Grinter is a professor in the School of Interactive Computing in the College of Computing at the Georgia Institute of Technology (Georgia Tech). She is affiliated with the RIM@GT, the GVU Center and the Scheller College of Business. Grinter's research lies generally in the fields of human-computer interaction (HCI) and computer-supported cooperative work (CSCW). She has chaired and published papers in top-tier academic conferences in these fields. Her research and expert opinion on technology have also been reported in major news media sources.

== Early life and education ==
Grinter was born in Norwich, England, UK, and attended the City of Norwich School and Hethersett High School. She pursued undergraduate studies at the University of Leeds, graduating in 1991 with a B.Sc. (Hons) in Computer Science. Following this, Grinter received an EPSRC fellowship to study at the University of California, Irvine, where she earned a M.S. (1994) and a Ph.D. (1996), both in Information and Computer Science. As a graduate student, Grinter was influenced by David Parnas, whose work in software engineering spoke to Grinter's burgeoning interest in the relationship between humans and software. Grinter's dissertation, titled, "Understanding Dependencies: A Study of the Coordination Challenges in Software Development", was chaired by Jonathan Grudin.

== Research career ==
Upon receiving her Ph.D. from the University of California, Irvine, Grinter worked at Bell Labs in Naperville, Illinois as a Technical Staff Member from 1996 to 2000. She then left Bell Labs to accept a position as a Research Staff Member at Palo Alto Research Center (PARC) from 2000 to 2004. At PARC, Grinter supervised a study of iTunes use in the workplace whose results were reported in The Washington Post, the San Francisco Chronicle, and other major news outlets. One of the study's contributions was to show that "playlist anxiety" occurs in the workplace and not only in collegiate settings. In 2004, Grinter transitioned from industrial to academic research and joined the faculty of the College of Computing at Georgia Tech as an associate professor. At Georgia Tech, she founded and currently directs the Work2Play Lab in the GVU Center. In 2006, Grinter served as the Research Papers Co-chair for CHI, the most prestigious academic conference in the field of HCI. Her research and expert opinion on technology have been reported in the Atlanta Journal-Constitution, MSNBC, and CNN.

== Research interests ==
Grinter's research lies generally in the fields of human-computer interaction (HCI) and computer-supported cooperative work (CSCW). Her earlier work dealt with the challenges of distributed software engineering, while her more recent work has focused on HCI, CSCW, and ubiquitous computing applications beyond the workplace, including instant messaging and SMS usage among teenagers, museum visitor behavior, technologies for religion, and domestic computing opportunities. Grinter is a proponent of qualitative and empirical research methods, often conducting interviews and ethnographic studies to understand intersections between humans and technologies. One of Grinter's best-known publications, "Instant Messaging in Teen Life", coauthored with Leysia Palen, was reported as one of the 15 most-downloaded papers on the ACM Digital Library for the year of 2006.

== Awards and honors ==
- 2009: ACM Distinguished Member
