= Stephen Brewster =

Professor at University of Glasgow

Stephen Brewster FRSE is the Professor of Human-Computer Interaction in the Department of Computing Science at the University of Glasgow, UK, where he runs the Multimodal Interaction Group. His main research interest is multimodal human-computer interaction, sound and haptics and gestures. Brewster received a PhD at the Human-Computer Interaction Group at the University of York. He organized the Conference on Human-Computer Interaction with Mobile Devices and Services (MobileHCI) several times and is the organiser for the CHI Conference on Human Factors in Computing Systems alongside Geraldine Fitzpatrick. He has contributed to several scientific books.

Brewster was elected a Fellow of the Royal Society of Edinburgh in March 2017.
