= Joseph J. LaViola Jr. =

American computer scientist

- Education: B.S. Computer Science; Sc.M. Computer Science; Sc.M. Applied Mathematics; Ph.D. Computer Science
- Alma mater: Florida Atlantic University; Brown University
- Occupations: Computer scientist, author, consultant, and academic
- Known for: Pen- and touch-based interactive computing, virtual and augmented reality, 3D spatial user interfaces
- Awards: CAREER Award, National Science Foundation (2009); IEEE VGTC Virtual Reality Academy (2025); ACM CHI Academy (2026)
- Scientific career
- Fields: User interface design, interactive computing
- Institutions: University of Central Florida; Brown University; Fluidity Software; JJL Interface Consultants
- Doctoral advisor: Andy van Dam

Joseph J. LaViola Jr. is an American computer scientist, author, consultant, and academic. He holds the Charles N. Millican Professorship in Computer Science and leads the Interactive Computing Experiences Research Cluster at the University of Central Florida (UCF). He also serves as a consultant at JJL Interface Consultants as well as co-founder of Fluidity Software.

LaViola's research interests include virtual and augmented reality, pen and touch-based interactive computing, human-robot interaction, 3D spatial interfaces, user interface evaluation and multimodal interaction. He has authored over 185 journal articles and conference papers, 8 book chapters, and is the lead author of the second edition of 3D User Interfaces: Theory and Practice, and co-author of Designing Immersive Video Games Using 3DUI Technologies: Improving the Gamer's User Experience. His contributions to the field of computer science resulted in him winning the UCF Reach for the Stars Award and a NSF Career Award.

LaViola is an associate editor for the International Journal of Human-Computer Studies and ACM Transactions on Interactive Intelligent Systems.

== Education and early career ==
LaViola earned a B.S. from Florida Atlantic University in 1996. He then served as a research scientist at the Fraunhofer Center for Research in Computer Graphics in 1997, developing demonstration applications for a table-based virtual environment display system. Concurrently, he pursued higher education, obtaining Sc.M. degree in computer science in 2000 and Applied Mathematics in 2001. In 2005, he earned his Ph.D. in computer science from Brown University, where he also served as a postdoctoral research associate.

== Career ==
LaViola began as an adjunct assistant professor of computer science at Brown University in 2006. Concurrently, he held a Research Faculty position at the Microsoft Center for Research on Pen-Centric Computing from 2006 to 2009 and has been serving as an affiliated research faculty at the Institute for Simulation and Training since 2008. While at UCF, he served as assistant professor from 2007 to 2010, eventually being appointed as CAE Link Professor and associate professor. Throughout this time, he maintained his role at Brown University as an adjunct associate professor of computer science from 2013 to 2018, simultaneously serving as a Charles N. Millican Faculty Fellow and associate professor of computer science at UCF from 2015 to 2018, during which he also directed the Modeling and Simulation Graduate Program. He is serving as director of the Interactive Computing Experiences Research Cluster at UCF. In addition, he holds the title of Charles N. Millican Professor of computer science,

LaViola co-founded Fluidity Software in 2005, and has been serving as a consultant since then.

== Works ==
LaViola's book, 3D User Interfaces: Theory and Practice, offered a guide to designing user interfaces (UIs) for 3D environments, addressing interaction principles and techniques. The second edition of this book covered a range of emerging applications and presented technologies for designing optimal user experiences for 3D interaction. In 2018, alongside Arun K. Kulshreshth, he published Designing Immersive Video Games Using 3DUI Technologies: Improving the Gamer's User Experience, exploring the use of 3DUI technologies to enhance video game experiences through various interactions aimed at immersing users in three-dimensional environments.

== Research ==
LaViola has focused his research, in part, on creating pen-centric and multi-touch user interfaces, particularly in mathematical sketching, while also investigating the pedagogical effectiveness of educational applications and the impact of pen-centric interfaces on user experience.

=== User interfaces and applications ===
LaViola's research on virtual environment technology has revolved around enhancing 3-D user interface design and introducing techniques. He delved into the issue of cybersickness in virtual environments (VEs), where users experienced symptoms akin to motion sickness and presented three conflicting cybersickness theories on its causes and suggested potential methods for reducing cybersickness in VEs. Additionally, he elaborated on three-dimensional (3-D) user interface design in VEs, demonstrating the impact of various hardware devices on user interaction by categorizing user-interaction tasks into navigation, selection/manipulation, and system control. He alongside other researchers also introduced interaction techniques for hands-free multi-scale navigation in virtual environments, highlighting the potential benefits of freeing users' hands for tasks like modeling and object manipulation. Furthermore, his systematic study on the recognition of 3D gestures involved creating a database of 25 distinct gestures and analyzing the impact of training sample size showcasing that both linear and AdaBoost classifiers can achieve over 90% accuracy in recognizing up to 25 gestures.

LaViola, in collaboration with Robert C. Zeleznik, introduced "MathPad^{2}", a mathematical sketching application, which automatically associated elements in drawings with corresponding mathematical expressions, facilitating problem-solving and visualization. In addition, he contributed to the introduction of algorithms utilizing GentleBoost and a latency-aware learning formulation to train a logistic regression-based classifier and explored the accuracy-latency trade-off for various numbers of actions.

=== Virtual and augmented reality ===
LaViola has made contributions to the development and usability of virtual and augmented reality technologies. By comparing unscented and extended Kalman filtering in enhancing human head and hand tracking for virtual reality applications, he found that extended Kalman filtering is preferable due to its lower computational overhead and better handling of quaternion motion dynamics in virtual reality contexts. He alongside Simon J Julier, addressed the application of a Kalman filter-type estimator to physical systems with nonlinear equality constraints between state variables, arguing that existing methods inadequately enforce these constraints and proposed a new method utilizing the projection method twice to address both types of constraints.

LaViola's work, in collaboration with Daniel F. Keefe and colleagues, on CavePainting detailed the system's features to highlight physical props and gestures and facilitated intuitive interaction to present an approach in virtual reality art creation and user interaction. In a collaborative research study, he evaluated the effectiveness of an augmented reality (AR)-based context-aware assembly support system and proposed two AR visualization modes showcasing how the visualization mode displaying target status next to real objects performs better than direct overlay.

== Awards and honors ==
- 2009 – CAREER Award, National Science Foundation
- 2013 – College of Engineering and Computer Science Excellence in Graduate Teaching Award, University of Central Florida
- 2021 – Inducted into the UCF Scroll and Quill Society, University of Central Florida
- 2025 - Inducted into the IEEE VGTC Virtual Reality Academy
- 2026 - Inducted into the ACM CHI Academy

== Bibliography ==
=== Selected books ===
- Designing Immersive Video Games Using 3DUI Technologies: Improving the Gamer's User Experience (2018) ISBN 978-3030085827
- 3D User Interfaces: Theory and Practice 1st Edition (2004) ISBN 978-0321980045
- 3D User Interfaces: Theory and Practice 2nd Edition (2017) ISBN 978-0134034324

=== Selected articles ===
- LaViola Jr, J. J. (2000). A discussion of cybersickness in virtual environments. ACM Sigchi Bulletin, 32(1), 47–56.
- Van Dam, A., Forsberg, A. S., Laidlaw, D. H., LaViola, J. J., & Simpson, R. M. (2000). Immersive VR for scientific visualization: A progress report. IEEE Computer Graphics and Applications, 20(6), 26–52.
- Bowman, D. A., Kruijff, E., LaViola, J. J., & Poupyrev, I. (2001). An introduction to 3-D user interface design. Presence, 10(1), 96–108.
- LaViola, J. J. (2003). A comparison of unscented and extended Kalman filtering for estimating quaternion motion. In Proceedings of the 2003 American Control Conference (pp. 2435-2440, Vol. 3). IEEE.
- Julier, S. J., & LaViola, J. J. (2007). On Kalman filtering with nonlinear equality constraints. IEEE Transactions on Signal Processing, 55(6), 2774–2784.
