= Allison Woodruff =

American computer scientist

Allison Gyle Woodruff is an American computer scientist whose work concerns human–computer interaction, information visualization, algorithmic fairness, sustainability, citizen science, and environmental monitoring. She is a user experience researcher in the Google Security & Privacy team.

== Education and career ==
Woodruff majored in English at California State University, Chico, and has master's degrees in both linguistics and computer science from the University of California, Davis. She completed her Ph.D. in computer science in 1998 at the University of California, Berkeley, with the dissertation Data Lineage and Information Density in Database Visualization supervised by Michael Stonebraker.

Before joining Google, she worked for Xerox PARC from 1998 to 2004, and then for Intel Research Berkeley.

== Recognition ==
Woodruff was named to the CHI Academy in 2021 and became an ACM Distinguished Member in 2024.
