= George Butterworth (psychologist) =

British psychologist (1946–2000)

- Born: 8 November 1946
- Died: 12 February 2000 (aged 53)

Academic background
- Education: University of Oxford
- Thesis: The development of the object concept in human infants (1974)

Academic work
- Discipline: Psychology
- Sub-discipline: Developmental Psychology
- Institutions: University of Southampton; University of Stirling; University of Sussex

George Esmond Butterworth (8 November 1946 – 12 February 2000) was a British professor of psychology, who studied infant development.

== Life and work ==
After completing his D.Phil. at Oxford, Butterworth took a post at Southampton University, moving to a chair in psychology at Stirling in 1985, before coming to Sussex in 1991. He was appointed honorary professor, University of East London, in 1996.

His contributions to the discipline include founding both the British Infancy Research Group and the Journal of Developmental Science, as well as heading numerous groups ranging from the Scientific Affairs Board of the British Psychological Society to the European Society for Developmental Psychology.

== Selected publications ==
=== Books ===
- Butterworth, George, Julie Rutkowska, and Michael Scaife. Evolution and developmental psychology. Vol. 4. Harvester, 1985.

=== Articles ===
- Butterworth, George, and Nicholas Jarrett. "What minds have in common is space: Spatial mechanisms serving joint visual attention in infancy." British journal of Developmental Psychology 9.1 (1991): 55–72.
- Butterworth, George, E. Verweij, and Brian Hopkins. "The development of prehension in infants: Halverson revisited." British Journal of Developmental Psychology 15.2 (1997): 223-236.
- Carpenter, Malinda, et al. "Social cognition, joint attention, and communicative competence from 9 to 15 months of age." Monographs of the Society for Research in Child Development (1998): i-174.
