= Gregory Abowd =

American computer scientist (born 1964)

Gregory Dominic Abowd
- Born: September 12, 1964 (age 61); Farmington Hills, MI, US
- Education: University of Oxford, University of Notre Dame
- Known for: ubiquitous computing, human-computer interaction, software engineering, technology and autism
- Awards: ACM Fellow, CHI Academy, CHI Social Impact Award, NSF CAREER Award
- Scientific career
- Fields: Human-Computer Interaction, Ubiquitous Computing, Software Engineering, Human-Centered Computing
- Workplaces: Georgia Tech, GVU Center, Health Systems Institute
- Doctoral students: Anind Dey, Jennifer Mankoff, Shwetak Patel

Gregory Dominic Abowd (born September 12, 1964) is a computer scientist best known for his work in ubiquitous computing, software engineering, and technologies for autism. He currently serves as the Dean of the College of Engineering and Professor of Electrical and Computer Engineering at Northeastern University. Previously he was the J.Z. Liang Professor in the School of Interactive Computing at the Georgia Institute of Technology, where he joined the faculty in 1994.

== Biography ==
=== Early life ===
Gregory Abowd was born in 1964 and raised in Farmington Hills, a suburb of Detroit, Michigan. He graduated summa cum laude with a B.S. in Honors Mathematics from the University of Notre Dame in 1986. He attended the University of Oxford in the United Kingdom as a Rhodes Scholar, where he received his M.Sc. in 1987 and his D.Phil. in 1991, both in the field of Computation.

He was a research associate from 1989 to 1992 at the University of York and a postdoctoral research associate from 1992 to 1994 at Carnegie Mellon University. In 1994, he was appointed to the faculty at the Georgia Institute of Technology.

=== Research interests and achievements ===
Abowd's published work is primarily in the areas of Human-Computer Interaction, Ubiquitous Computing, Software Engineering, and Computer Supported Cooperative Work. He is particularly known for his work in ubiquitous computing, where he has made contributions in the areas of automated capture and access, context-aware computing, and smart home technologies. Abowd's research primarily has an applications focus, where he has worked to develop systems for health care, education, the home, and individuals with autism.

At Georgia Tech, he teaches in the School of Interactive Computing in the College of Computing. He is a member of the GVU Center and directs the Ubiquitous Computing and Autism and Technology research groups. Abowd was the founding director of the Aware Home Research Initiative and is executive director of the Health Systems Institute at Georgia Tech. In 2008, he founded the Atlanta Autism Consortium, a group of researchers interested in autism in Atlanta, Georgia. He is one of the authors of Human-Computer Interaction (Prentice Hall), a popular human-computer interaction textbook.

Abowd's contributions to the fields of Human-Computer Interaction and Ubiquitous Computing have been recognized through his numerous awards and extensive published work. In 2008, he was named a Fellow of the Association for Computing Machinery, one of the top honors for computer science researchers. Within the field of Human-Computer Interaction, he has been recognized at the CHI Conference, the most prestigious publication venue in HCI, as a top researcher through induction to the CHI Academy in 2008 and was awarded the Social Impact Award in 2007. He is also one of the most prolific authors in computer science and in the field of Human-Computer Interaction.

In March 2016, Abowd was named the J.Z. Liang Professor in the School of Interactive Computing.

In March 2021, Abowd became the Dean of the College of Engineering and Professor of Electrical and Computer Engineering at Northeastern University.

== Selected bibliography ==
- Kientz, J.A., R.I. Arriaga, and G.D. Abowd: Baby Steps: Evaluation of a System to Support Record-Keeping for Parents of Young Children. CHI 2009.
- Hayes, G.R., L.M. Gardere, G.D. Abowd, K.N. Truong: CareLog: a selective archiving tool for behavior management in schools. CHI 2008: 685–694
- Kientz, J.A., G.R. Hayes, T.L. Westeyn, T. Starner, G.D. Abowd: Pervasive Computing and Autism: Assisting Caregivers of Children with Special Needs. IEEE Pervasive Computing 6(1): 28-35 (2007)
- Patel, S.N., K.N. Truong, and G.D. Abowd. PowerLine Positioning: A Practical Sub-Room-Level Indoor Location System for Domestic Use. Proceedings of Ubicomp 2006.
- Kientz, J.A. G.R. Hayes, G.D. Abowd, R.E. Grinter: From the war room to the living room: decision support for home-based therapy teams. CSCW 2006: 209–218
- Hayes, G.R., J.A. Kientz, K.N. Truong, D.R. White, G.D. Abowd, Trevor Pering: Designing Capture Applications to Support the Education of Children with Autism. Ubicomp 2004: 161–178
- Abowd, G.D., and E.D. Mynatt: Charting past, present, and future research in ubiquitous computing. ACM Trans. Comput.-Hum. Interact. 7(1): 29-58 (2000)
- Abowd, G.D.: Classroom 2000: An Experiment with the Instrumentation of a Living Educational Environment. IBM Systems Journal 38(4): 508-530 (1999)
- Abowd, G.D., A.K. Dey, P.J. Brown, N. Davies, M. Smith, P. Steggles: Towards a Better Understanding of Context and Context-Awareness. HUC 1999: 304–307
- Kidd, C.D. R. Orr, G.D. Abowd, C.G. Atkeson, I.A. Essa, B. MacIntyre, E.D. Mynatt, T. Starner, W. Newstetter: The Aware Home: A Living Laboratory for Ubiquitous Computing Research. CoBuild 1999: 191–198
- Abowd, G.D. C.G. Atkeson, J.I. Hong, S. Long, R. Kooper, M. Pinkerton: Cyberguide: A mobile context-aware tour guide. Wireless Networks 3(5): 421-433 (1997)
- Abowd, G.D., R.B. Allen, D. Garlan: Formalizing Style to Understand Descriptions of Software Architecture. ACM Trans. Softw. Eng. Methodol. 4(4): 319-364 (1995)
