= Tawanna Dillahunt =

American computer scientist and information scientist

- Born: North Carolina, United States
- Education: North Carolina State University (BS); Oregon Graduate Institute of Science and Technology (MS); Carnegie Mellon University (MS, PhD)
- Known for: Community design
- Scientific career
- Fields: Human-computer interaction Information science Computer Science
- Workplaces: University of Michigan
- Thesis: Using social technologies to increase sharing and communication around household energy consumption in low-income and rental communities (2012)
- Doctoral advisor: Jennifer Mankoff
- Website: http://www.tawannadillahunt.com/

Tawanna Dillahunt is an American computer scientist and professor of information based at the University of Michigan School of Information. In addition to her work in academia, Dillahunt also runs the Social Innovations Group, a research group that designs, builds, and enhances technologies to address real-world problems.

== Education and career ==
Dillahunt received a bachelor's degree in computer engineering from North Carolina State University. She subsequently earned two Masters of Science from Oregon Health & Science University and Carnegie Mellon University, as well as a PhD in computer science from Carnegie Mellon.

She started at University of Michigan in 2013 as a post-doctoral fellow, then became an assistant professor in 2014 in both the School of Information and the College of Engineering. Dillahunt was approved for tenure in the School of Information in May 2025.

Dillahunt has worked in the areas of human-computer interaction, pervasive and ubiquitous computing, and computer supported collaborative work and social computing, with an interest in marginalized and historically excluded groups. She has received multiple grants from the National Science Foundation to support her work. In 2019, she received a grant to study transportation barriers in underserved urban and rural communities in Michigan. She was the lead principal investigator on a grant awarded by the National Science Foundation in 2022 to support economic mobility and bridge the digital divide in the U.S. through the "Community Tech Workers" project.

She received the inaugural Skip Ellis Early Career Award from the Computing Research Association in 2020 and has been a Kavli Fellow with the National Academy of Sciences. In 2021, Dillahunt was recognized as a Distinguished Member of The Association for Computing Machinery and received the Elizabeth Caroline Crosby Research Award at University of Michigan.

She has held limited appointments at Harvard University as a Radcliffe Fellow and at Massachusetts Institute of Technology as an MLK Scholar.

== Impact ==
Dillahunt is best known for her work designing and evaluating technologies related to unemployment, environmental sustainability, and technical literacy. She has created numerous technology tools that lead to strategies to better recruit marginalized populations to career opportunities. Dillahunt has been cited over 6,000 times according to Google Scholar. Her research has been included in the ACM Conference on Human Factors in Computing Systems and the Conference on Computer-Supported Cooperative Work and Social Computing. She has also been published in Journal of Medical Internet Research, Transportation Research Part A, and Journal of Transport Geography.

== Awards and honors ==
In 2021, she was elected an ACM Distinguished Member.

== Selected works ==
- Froehlich, J., Dillahunt, T., Klasnja, P., Mankoff, J., Consolvo, S., Harrison, B., & Landay, J. A. (2009, April). UbiGreen: investigating a mobile tool for tracking and supporting green transportation habits. In Proceedings of the sigchi conference on human factors in computing systems (pp. 1043–1052) (cited >860 times, according to Google Scholar).
- Dillahunt, T. R., & Malone, A. R. (2015, April). The promise of the sharing economy among disadvantaged communities. In Proceedings of the 33rd Annual ACM Conference on Human Factors in Computing Systems (pp. 2285–2294) (cited >530 times, according to Google Scholar).
- Dillahunt, T. R. (2014, April). Fostering social capital in economically distressed communities. In Proceedings of the SIGCHI Conference on Human Factors in Computing Systems (pp. 531–540).
- Dillahunt, T., Wang, Z., & Teasley, S. D. (2014). Democratizing higher education: Exploring MOOC use among those who cannot afford a formal education. International Review of Research in Open and Distributed Learning, 15(5), 177–196.
