= Gerhard Fischer (professor) =

American computer scientist (born 1945)

Professor Emeritus Gerhard Fischer
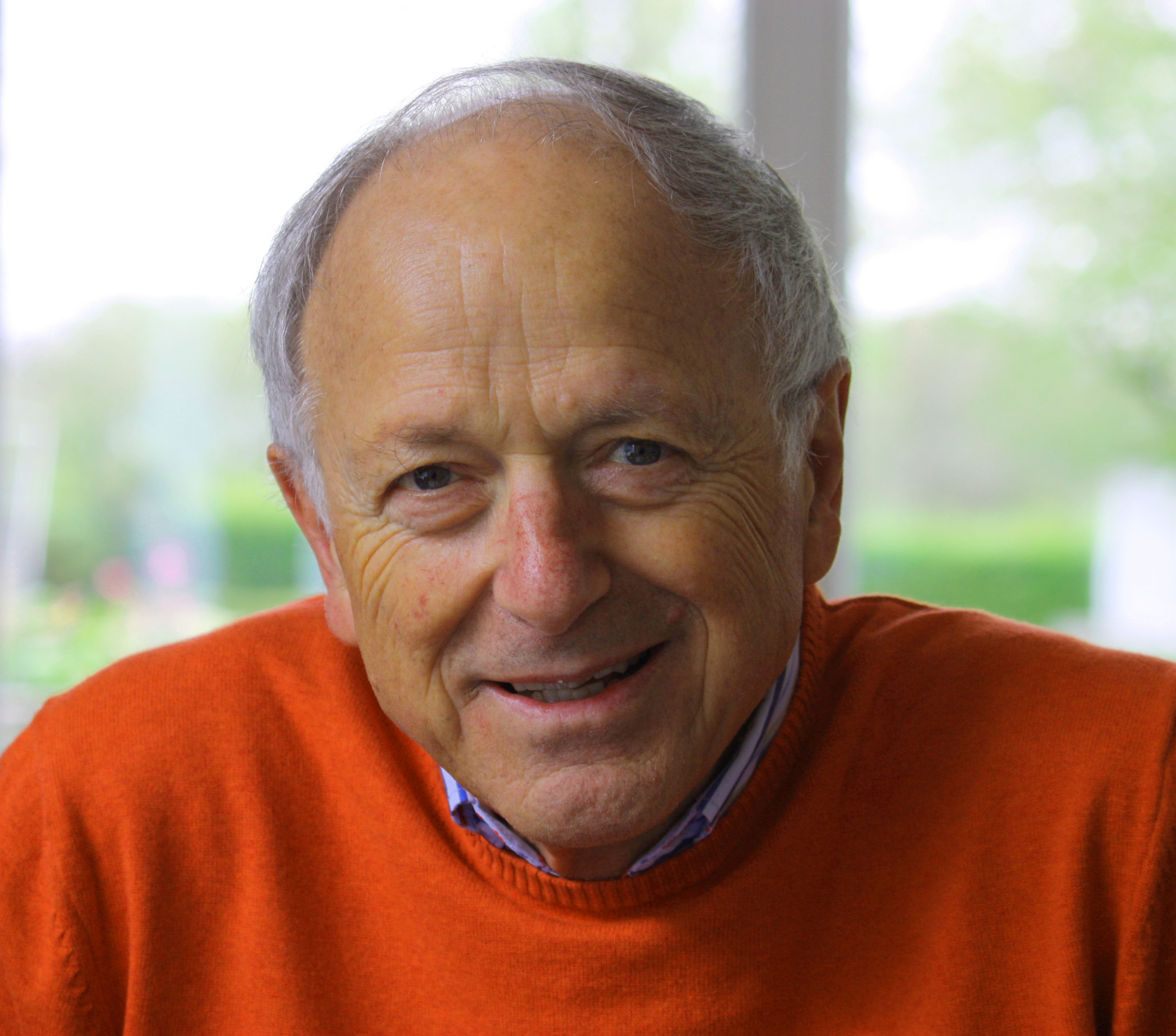
- Education: University of Hamburg; Heidelberg University
- Awards: CHI Academy, ACM Fellow, RIGO Award (SIGDOC)
- Scientific career
- Fields: Design, meta-design, human-computer interaction, lifelong learning, Intelligence Augmentation (IA)
- Workplaces: University of Colorado, Boulder
- Doctoral advisor: Klaus Brunnstein
- Other academic advisors: Herbert A. Simon (Habilitation Advisor)
- Website: l3d.colorado.edu/people/gerhard-fischers-home-page/

Gerhard Fischer (born July 2, 1945) is Professor Emeritus of Computer Science, a Fellow of the Institute of Cognitive Science, and the founder and director of the Center for LifeLong Learning & Design (L3D) at the University of Colorado, Boulder.

== Education ==
In 1971, Fischer graduated with a Master's in Mathematics and Physical Education from Heidelberg University. With a fellowship from the German Academic Exchange Service (DAAD), he spent the following two years at the University of British Columbia, Vancouver, and the University of California, Irvine. He obtained a PhD from the University of Hamburg in Computer Science (1977), followed by a postdoctoral fellowship at MIT (Massachusetts Institute of Technology) Cambridge (working with Seymour Papert and the LOGO community) and Xerox Parc (working with Alan Kay and the Smalltalk community).

== Career ==
From 1978 to 1984, Fischer was an Assistant and Associate Professor at the University of Stuttgart, during which he spent several extended visits at Carnegie Mellon University, Pittsburgh to study with Herbert A. Simon who served as the primary advisor for his "Habilitation" degree that he obtained in 1983 from the Department of Computer Science at the University of Stuttgart. In 1984, Fischer accepted a position in the Computer Science Department of the University of Colorado, Boulder combined with being a Fellow of the Institute of Cognitive Science. He was Stiftungsprofessor at the Department of Computer Science of the Technische Universität Darmstadt, Germany in 1994-1995 and Erskine fellow at the University of Canterbury, Christchurch, New Zealand in 2002-2003. In 2012, Fischer was awarded a "Chair of Excellence" at the Charles III University of Madrid, Spain and he spent six months in 2012 and 2013 as a visiting professor at UC3M. He obtained two fellowships from the Hanse-Wissenschaftskolleg (HWK) an Advanced Study Institute in Delmenhorst, Germany and he twice spent 6 months — in 2014/2015 and 2021/2022 — at the HWK as a fellow. He was invited as a Visiting Professor to the TU Wien, Austria (October 2018) and the Hiroshima University, Japan (April 2019).

== Research ==
In his work at the University of Stuttgart (1978-1984), Fischer explored theoretical frameworks and system developments for Human-Computer Interaction and co-founded conferences in Germany on "Mensch-Maschine Kommunikation" (1980) and "Software Ergonomics" (1983). His early work at University of Colorado Boulder (1984-1994) was centered on domain-oriented design environments, critiquing systems, and the exploration of high-functionality environments. Starting in 1994, Fischer explored themes in meta-design, social creativity, cultures of participation, computer-supported collaborative learning, support environments for people with cognitive disabilities, and collaborative problem-solving and decision-making with tabletop computing environments. He participated in the development of numerous NSF research programs (including: Lifelong Learning, Science of Design, Creativity and IT). During his years at CU Boulder, he served as the principal advisor of 20 PhD students.

He retired as professor emeritus in 2012. Since 2012, Fischer's research activities have centered around identifying design trade-offs associated with wicked problems, human-centered AI, rethinking and reinventing learning, education, and collaboration, and exploring quality of life as a fundamental objective of the digital age.

Fischer is serving on the boards of the Bonn-Aachen International Center for Information Technology, Munich Center of the Learning Sciences, LMU Munich, Wirtschaftsinformatik und Neue Medien, University of Siegen and GRADE PhD School, University of Gothenburg, Sweden.

== Awards and honors ==
- Inducted into the SIGCHI Academy in 2007 for introducing visionary, long-lasting research themes to CHI by creatively combining European and American research traditions.
- Elected as a Fellow of the Association for Computing Machinery (ACM) in 2009 for “contributions to human-computer interaction and computer-mediated lifelong learning.”
- Awarded the RIGO Award from the ACM Special Interest Group on Design of Communication (SIGDOC) in 2012 for research on new conceptual frameworks and new media for learning, working, and collaborating
- Awarded the EUSSET-IISI Lifetime Achievement Award from the European Society for Socially Embedded Technologies in 2025 for his visionary, long-lasting research agenda for exploring how computer artefacts could contribute to the quality of life and specifically to the quality of education for all human actors.
- Appointed “honorary doctor” at the IT Faculty, University of Gothenburg, Sweden, in 2015 for developing a perspective of Artificial Intelligence focused on empowering humans instead of replacing them and contributing to the quality of life for everyone.
