= Aaron Marcus =

American computer interface designer (born 1943)

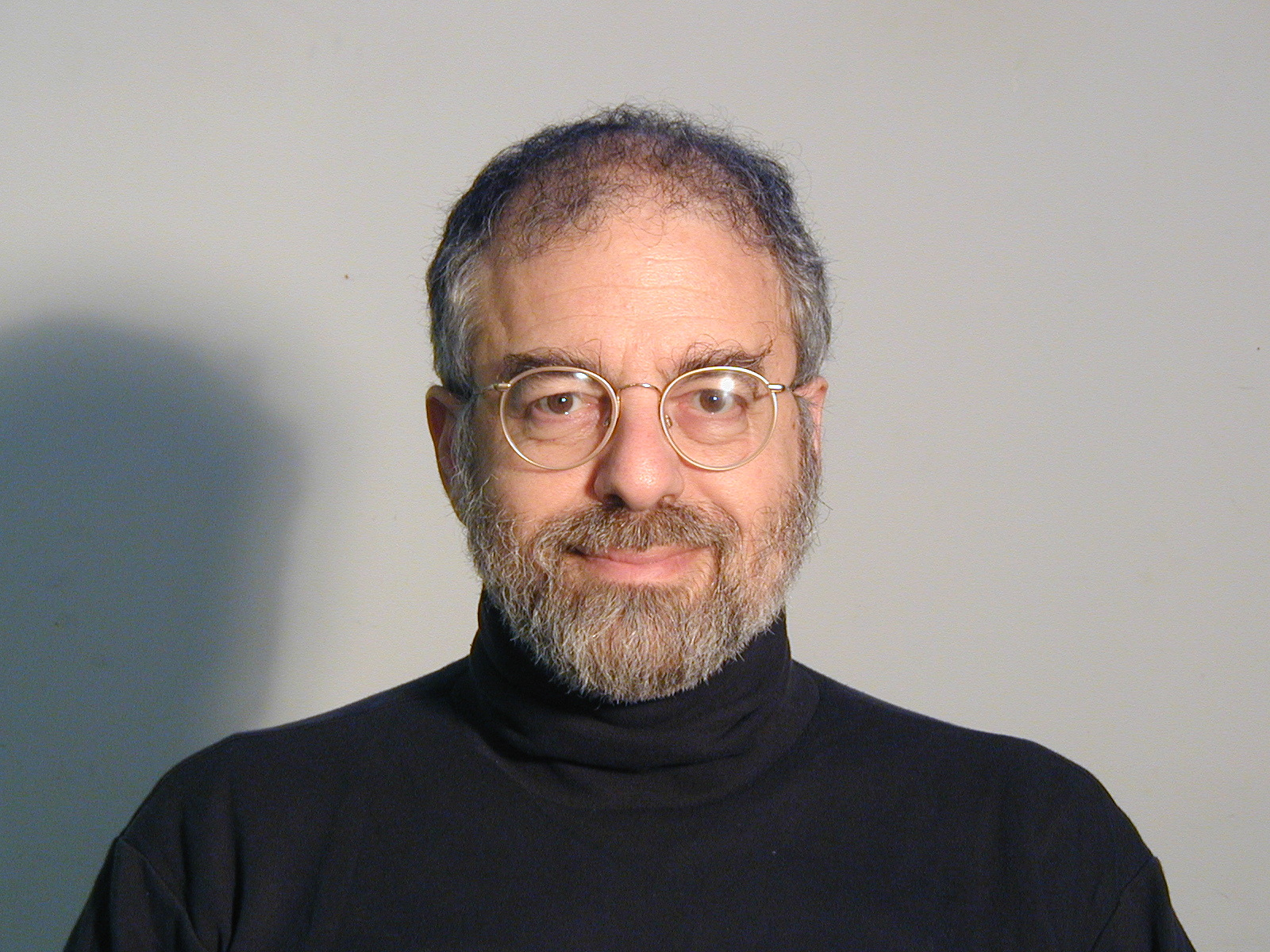
- Born: 22 May 1943 (age 83); Omaha, Nebraska, U.S.
- Occupations: User interface and information visualization analyst/designer
- Awards: AIGA Fellow, Member CHI Academy, ICOGRADA Graphic Design Hall of Fame Master Graphic Designer of the 20th Century

Academic background
- Education: Princeton University, BA, Physics, 1965; Yale University, School of Art and Architecture, Graphic Design, BFA, MFA, 1968

Aaron Marcus (born 22 May 1943) is an American user-interface and information-visualization designer, and a computer graphics artist.

== Biography ==
Marcus grew up in Omaha, Nebraska, in the 1950s. In secondary school he studied both science and art, and was editor of his high-school newspaper.

He graduated with an A.B. in physics from Princeton University in 1965 after completing a senior thesis. He obtained BFA and MFA in 1968 at Yale University School of Art and Architecture.

At Yale he also began the study of computer graphics, taking a course in basic functioning of computers, and he learned FORTRAN programming at the Yale Computer Center in the summer of 1966.

== Career ==
In 1967, Marcus spent a summer making ASCII art as a researcher at AT&T’s Bell Laboratories in Murray Hill, New Jersey.

From 1968 to 1977, Marcus taught at Princeton University in the School of Architecture and Urban Planning and in the Visual Arts Program.

In 1969-1971, he programmed a prototype desktop publishing page-layout application for AT&T Bell Labs, and in 1971-1973, while a faculty member at Princeton, he claims to have programmed some of the first virtual reality art/design spaces.

In the early 1980s, he was a staff scientist at Lawrence Berkeley Laboratory in Berkeley, as well as a faculty member of the University of California at Berkeley’s College of Environmental Design.

In 1982, he founded Aaron Marcus and Associates, Inc. (AM+A), a user-interface design and consulting company, one of the first such independent, computer-based design firms.

== Articles and papers ==
Marcus has written over 250 articles, some of which have been published in trade journals. A selection of his published papers follows:

- Marcus, Aaron. "Playing with Type: The Work of Chang Sik Kim." Foreword, in Typogram: Visual Pun, Exhibition Book, "Doo Sung Design Gallery Publishers, Seoul, South Korea, 26 March-6 April 2011, (in English, Korean, and Chinese), pp. 31-35.
- Marcus, Aaron. "Diagrams: Past, Present, and Future," An Introduction, in, Gauguin, Jan, Designing Diagrams: Making Information Accessible through Design. Amsterdam: BIS Publishers, ISBN 978-90-6369-228-5, 2011, pp. 6–7.
- Marcus, Aaron. "Branding the User Experience." On the Edge Column, User Experience Magazine. 10:3, 3rd Quarter, 2011, p. 30.
- Marcus, Aaron, and Gould, Emilie. "Conducting a Culture Audit for Saudi Arabia" Multilingual, Issue 120, 22:4, June 2011, pp. 42–46.
- Marcus, Aaron, and Jean, Jérémie. "Green Machine: Designing Mobile Information Displays to Encourage Energy Conservation." Information Design Journal, 17:3, 2010, pp. 233–243.
- Marcus, Aaron. "UX Storytelling." Book Review, User Experience Magazine. 10:1, 1st Quarter, 2011, p. 30.
- Marcus, Aaron, My Journey: From Physics to Graphic Design, to User-Interface / Information-Visualization Design, in Alexberg, Mel, (Ed.), Educating Artists for the Future: Learning at the Intersections of Art, Science, Technology, and Culture, Chicago, IL: University of Chicago Press, Spring 2008, 192 pp.
- Global/Intercultural User-Interface Design, in Jacko, J. and Spears, A. (Eds.), Chapter 18, Handbook of Human-Computer Interaction, Third Edition. New York, NY: Lawrence Erlbaum Publishers, 2007, pp. 355–380.
- The Sun Rises in the East, Fast Forward Column, Interactions, 14: 6, November–December 2007, pp. 44–45

== Books ==
Marcus has written/co-written six books. Here is a selection:

- Baecker, Ron, and Marcus, Aaron. Human Factors and Typography for More Readable Programs. Reading: Addison-Wesley Longman, 1990.
- Marcus, Aaron. Graphic Design for Electronic Documents and User Interfaces. Reading: Addison-Wesley Longman, 1992.
- Marcus, Aaron, Smilonich, Nick, and Thompson, Lynne. The Cross-GUI Handbook for Multiplatform User-Interface Design. Reading: Addison-Wesley Longman, 1994.
- Marcus, Aaron, Anxo Cereijo Roibas, and Riccardo Sala. Mobile TV: Customizing Content and Experience. London: Springer, 2010.

== Honors ==
- The Association for Computing Machinery (ACM) Special Interest Group for Computer-Human Interaction (SIGCHI) elected Marcus in 2008 to the CHI Academy. He has also been named an ACM Distinguished Member(2011)
- The American Institute of Graphic Arts (AIGA) through its Center for Cross-Cultural Design named Aaron Marcus an AIGA Fellow beginning June 2007.
- The International Council of Graphic Design Associations (ICOGRADA) included Aaron Marcus in its publication Masters of the 20th Century published in 2000.
