= Carl Gutwin =

Canadian computer scientist

Carl Gutwin is a Canadian computer scientist, professor and the director of the Human–computer interaction (HCI) Lab at the University of Saskatchewan. He is also a co-theme leader in the SurfNet research network and was a past holder of a Canada Research Chair in Next-Generation Groupware. Gutwin is known for his contributions in HCI ranging from the technical aspects of systems architectures, to the design and implementation of interaction techniques, and to social theory as applied to design. Gutwin was papers co-chair at CHI 2011 and was a conference co-chair of Computer Supported Cooperative Work 2010.

== Education ==
Gutwin has undergraduate degrees in computer science and in English literature. He received his PhD in 1997 from the University of Calgary, where he worked and developed the idea of workspace awareness as a design factor for distributed groupware systems.

== Research ==
Gutwin's main research areas are in Computer-Supported Cooperative Work (CSCW), groupware usability, interaction techniques, collaboration support, modelling human performance, information visualization and interface design. Along with his students and collaborators, Gutwin has published more than 200 papers in Human Computer Interaction and Computer Supported Cooperative Work.

=== KEA: Key Phrase Extraction ===
In 1999, Gutwin developed a key phrase extraction algorithm along with Ian Witten, Gordon Paynter, Eibe Frank, and Craig Nevill-Manning called KEA. Key phrases are important to a document as they provide a brief summary of a document's content and as document collections such as digital libraries become larger, the value of such summary information increases. The goal of the algorithm is to help alleviate the tedious process of assigning key phrases manually. The algorithm uses machine learning, lexical methods, and calculates feature values for each candidate to predict which candidates are good key phrases.

=== Workspace awareness for groupware ===
In 2002, Gutwin along with Saul Greenberg, developed a research paper regarding the idea of workspace awareness (the up-to-the-moment understanding of another person's interaction with a shared workspace) and how it can help and improve the usability of a groupware application. The goal of the research was to provide groupware designers a framework about how to design for awareness in multi-user systems, specifically workspace awareness. The developed framework can help educate designers about awareness in groupware and help to improve the quality of the systems that are built.

=== Group awareness in distributed software development ===
In 2004, Gutwin, alongside Reagan Penner and Kevin Schneider, evaluated how distributed developers maintain group awareness (where in the code are they working, what are they doing, and what their plans are). The team interviewed developers and reviewed project artifacts and communications from three open source projects. The findings suggested that developers maintain both a general awareness of the entire team and more detailed knowledge of people that they plan to work with. The primary tools for maintaining awareness were mailing lists and chat tools. The study is one of the first to consider how awareness works in the real world.

=== Tag clouds ===
In 2008, Gutwin along with Scott Bateman and Miguel Nacenta, explored the popular method of tag clouds which help visualize and link socially-organized information on websites. The goal of the research was to find out which visual features of tags draw the attention of viewers. The study was conducted by asking users to select tags from clouds that manipulated nine visual properties. The results showed that font size and font weight have stronger effects than other features such as intensity and number of characters. However, when several visual properties are changed at once, there is no one property that stands out above the others. The study also makes way for general applications such as the visual presentation of hyperlinks as a way to provide more information to web navigators.

=== Touch-based interaction ===
In 2012, Gutwin along with Andy Cockburn and David Ahlstrom, studied the human factors of touch based interactions such as tapping and dragging. The goal of the research was to provide developers a foundational knowledge in this area. The experiment was conducted using three input devices (the finger, stylus, and mouse as a performance baseline) and three different pointing activities which were bidirectional tapping, one-dimensional dragging, and radial dragging (pointing to items arranged in a circle around the cursor). For tapping, the results showed that finger pointing was faster than the stylus/mouse but inaccurate. For dragging, finger input is slower than mouse and stylus. For radial dragging, it was found that task time and movement distance are all linearly correlated with number of items available. Other radial dragging results showed that the stylus is the fastest but had the highest error rate of the three devices.

== Awards ==
Gutwin was inducted into the ACM CHI Academy for his contributions to HCI research in 2012. In 2015 he was recognized as an ACM Distinguished Member.
