= Jennifer Mankoff =

American computer scientist

- Education: Georgia Institute of Technology, Oberlin College
- Known for: human-computer interaction, ubiquitous computing, assistive technology, sustainability
- Awards: Sloan Fellowship, IBM Faculty Fellowship
- Scientific career
- Fields: Human-Computer Interaction, Ubiquitous Computing, Assistive technology, Human-Centered Computing
- Workplaces: Carnegie Mellon University; University of Washington
- Doctoral advisor: Gregory Abowd, Scott Hudson
- Doctoral students: Tawanna Dillahunt

Jennifer Mankoff is the Richard E. Ladner Endowed Professor and Associate Director for Diversity and Inclusion in the Paul G. Allen School of Computer Science & Engineering at the University of Washington, in Seattle, where she joined the faculty in 2017.

== Early life and education ==
Mankoff earned her B.A. at Oberlin College and her Ph.D. in computer science at the Georgia Institute of Technology advised by Gregory Abowd and Scott Hudson.

== Career ==
Mankoff was a professor in the Human-Computer Interaction Institute of the School of Computer Science at Carnegie Mellon University between 2004 and 2017. She was previously a faculty member in the Department of Electrical Engineering and Computer Science at the University of California, Berkeley between 2001 and 2004. Her research work focuses on tools and techniques for rapid, iterative prototyping of ubiquitous computing applications and accessible technology for people with disabilities.

Her research interests also include mediation of ambiguous, recognition-based interfaces. Application areas of her work include assistive technology for people with special needs and the elderly, health and safety, and technologies that promote sustainability. Mankoff has authored and co-authored over 45 full-length, significant scientific publications. She was awarded the Sloan Fellowship in 2007 and the IBM Faculty Fellowship in 2004 and 2006.

== Selected publications ==
- Woodruff, A. and Mankoff, J. 2009. Environmental Sustainability. IEEE Pervasive Computing 8, 1 (Jan. 2009), 18-21.
- Froehlich, J., Dillahunt, T., Klasnja, P., Mankoff, J., Consolvo, S., Harrison, B., and Landay, J. A. 2009. UbiGreen: investigating a mobile tool for tracking and supporting green transportation habits. In Proceedings of CHI '09.
- Carter, S. J. Mankoff and J. Heer, "Momento: Support for situated ubicomp experimentation," In Proceedings of CHI 2007.
- Mankoff, J. D. Matthews, S. R. Fussell and M. Johnson, "Leveraging Social Networks to Motivate Individuals to Reduce their Ecological Footprints," Proceedings of HICSS 2007.
- Mankoff, J., Fait, H., and Tran, T. Is your web page accessible? A comparative study of methods for assessing web page accessibility for the blind. In Proceedings of CHI 2005. 41-50.
- Carter, S. and J. Mankoff, "When Participants do the capturing: The role of media in diary studies," In Proceedings of CHI 2005 pp. 899–908. Nominated for best paper award.
- Mankoff, D., A. Dey, J. Mankoff, and K. Mankoff. Supporting Interspecies Social Awareness: Using Peripheral Displays for Distributed Pack Awareness. In Proceedings of UIST 2005. pp. 253–258. Satire.
