= Munmun De Choudhury =

Indian-American computer scientist and social scientist

- Occupation: Academic

Academic background
- Education: Maulana Azad National Institute of Technology (bachelor's); Arizona State University (Ph.D)

Academic work
- Institutions: Georgia Tech

Munmun De Choudhury is an Indian and American computer scientist and social scientist whose research concerns social media and the ways that it shapes and reflects mental health. She is J. Z. Liang Professor in the School of Interactive Computing at Georgia Tech.

== Early life an education ==
De Choudhury grew up in a small town in Tripura, a state in northeast India. She received a bachelor's degree in 2005 from the Maulana Azad National Institute of Technology in Bhopal, Madhya Pradesh, India, supported by a Jagadis Bose National Science Talent Search Scholarship.

She completed a Ph.D. in computer science at Arizona State University in 2011. Her doctoral dissertation, Analyzing the Dynamics of Communication in Online Social Network, was supervised by Hari Sundaram.

== Career ==
After postdoctoral research in the neXus research group at Microsoft Research in Redmond, Washington, she joined the Georgia Tech School of Interactive Computing as an assistant professor in 2014. She was promoted to associate professor in 2020, given the J. Z. Liang professorship in January 2025, and promoted to full professor effective August 2025.

In 2025, she joined OpenAI's Expert Council on Well-Being and AI.

== Recognition ==
De Choudhury's 2013 paper "Social Media as a Measurement Tool of Depression in Populations" (written with Scott Counts and Eric Horvitz) was recognized in 2022 by the inaugural Web Science Trust Test of Time Award, presented at the annual ACM Web Science Conference. She was a recipient of the 2023 SIGCHI Societal Impact Award, the following year named to the CHI Academy, and the year after an ACM Distinguished Member.
