= Michael Scaife =

British psychologist

- Born: 24 March 1948; Lincolnshire
- Died: 18 December 2001 (aged 53)
- Spouse: Yvonne Rogers

Academic background
- Education: University of Liverpool; University of Oxford

Academic work
- Discipline: Psychology
- Sub-discipline: Developmental Psychology
- Institutions: University of Sussex

Michael Scaife (24 March 1948 – 18 December 2001) was a British biologist, psychologist, and reader at the University of Sussex, known for his early work in developmental psychology and his later interdisciplinary study in cognitive and computing sciences.

== Biography ==
Born in Lincolnshire and raised in Coventry, Scaife attended the King Henry VIII grammar school on a scholarship, and obtained his MA in biology at University of Liverpool, and his PhD in psychology at University of Oxford.

Scaife started his academic career as research assistant at the ethology group of the University of Oxford, where he cooperated with Mike Cullen, Nikolaas Tinbergen and Richard Dawkins. Later in the 1970s at University of Oxford he participated in the education and cognition research group of Jerome Bruner, with whom he published the article "The capacity for joint visual attention in the infant" in Nature in 1975. According to Bruner and Clark their cooperation helped "revolutionise the study of the infant mind. The target was to unravel what was involved in a child's learning to master a culture and the technology it generates. Mike knew that this problem was all about interactions. He saw that spectators could never get to the gist of things. It was through interacting that you learned how to do things - and also what needed doing."

Later in the 1980s he moved to the University of Sussex, where he became senior lecturer in 1999, and reader in 2001. In 1987 at Sussex University he had co-founded the school of cognitive and computing sciences. Also with his partner Yvonne Rogers he founded the Interact Lab to study representation in problem solving.

== Selected publications ==
=== Books ===
- Butterworth, George, Julie Rutkowska, and Michael Scaife. Evolution and developmental psychology. Vol. 4. Harvester, 1985.

=== Articles ===
- Scaife, Michael, and Jerome S. Bruner. "The capacity for joint visual attention in the infant." Nature (1975).
- Scaife, Mike, and Yvonne Rogers. "External cognition: how do graphical representations work?." International journal of human-computer studies 45.2 (1996): 185–213.
- Scaife, M., Rogers, Y., Aldrich, F., & Davies, M. (1997, March). "Designing for or designing with? Informant design for interactive learning environments." In Proceedings of the ACM SIGCHI Conference on Human factors in computing systems (pp. 343–350). ACM.
- Navarro-Prieto, Raquel, Mike Scaife, and Yvonne Rogers. "Cognitive strategies in web searching." Proceedings of the 5th Conference on Human Factors & the Web. 1999.
- Cheng, Peter C-H., Ric K. Lowe, and Mike Scaife. "Cognitive science approaches to understanding diagrammatic representations." Artificial Intelligence Review 15.1-2 (2001): 79–94.
