= Victoria Bellotti =

British computer scientist

- Born: Manchester, UK
- Citizenship: American; British
- Education: Queen Mary and Westfield College; University College London
- Scientific career
- Fields: Human-computer interaction Personal Information Management
- Workplaces: Netflix; Lyft; PARC; University of California, Santa Cruz

Victoria Bellotti is a Senior CI researcher in the Member Experience Team at Netflix. Previously, she was a user experience manager for growth at Lyft and a research fellow at the Palo Alto Research Center. She is known for her work in the area of personal information management and task management, but from 2010 to 2018 she began researching context-aware peer-to-peer transaction partner matching and motivations for using peer-to-peer marketplaces which led to her joining Lyft. Victoria also serves as an adjunct professor in the Jack Baskin School of Engineering at University of California Santa Cruz, on the editorial board of the Personal and Ubiquitous Computing and as an associate editor for the International Journal of HCI. She is a researcher in the Human–computer interaction community. In 2013 she was awarded membership of the ACM SIGCHI Academy for her contributions to the field and professional community of human computer interaction.

== Life ==
Victoria was born in the United Kingdom. She completed a bachelor of science degree in psychology and a master of science degree in ergonomics at University College London. She completed her Ph.D. degree in human computer interaction at Queen Mary University of London. She came to the US in 1994. After that she worked at Xerox's Cambridge Research Lab (EuroPARC) for five years.

== Work and research ==
Victoria worked for London University, The British Government's Department of Trade and Industry, EuroPARC, and Apple Research Lab where she focused on domains such as transportation, process control, computer-mediated communication, collaboration, and ubiquitous computing.

Victoria was a research fellow in the computer sciences lab at the Palo Alto Research Center. and manager of the socio-technical and interaction research team. Her work included an emphasis on the use of ethnographic methods in business. She was the developer of developer of the opportunity discovery research and strategic investment targeting program. This program assisted clients with new technology-centered business ventures. She is interested in studying people to understand their practices, problems, and what they will need to do to be able to use future technologies. Victoria holds more than a dozen patents from her work at the Palo Alto Research Center.

Victoria has served as editor and committee member for various human-computer interaction publications, including as one of two co-chairs for the "Understanding People" technical papers subcommittee at the 2013 and 2014 ACM SIGCHI conference. Victoria has co-authored 19 patents and over 60 papers with an overall citation count of 13,808, h-index of 45 and i10-index of 87. Victoria's research has been covered in Forbes magazine.

== Awards ==
In 2013, Victoria was awarded membership of the ACM SIGCHI Academy for her contributions to the field and professional community of human computer interaction.

In 2016, Victoria Bellotti and Paul Dourish were jointly awarded the computer-supported cooperative work Lasting Impact Award for their 1992 paper, "Awareness and Coordination in Shared Workspaces".

She received honorable mention paper awards at CHI 2014 and 2015 and CSCW 2015.

== Selected publications ==
- P. Dourish and V. Bellotti. 1992. Awareness and Coordination in Shared Workspaces.
- A. MacLean, R. M. Young, V. Bellotti & T. P. Moran. 1991. Questions, Options, and Criteria: Elements of Design Space Analysis.
- N. Ducheneaut and V. Bellotti. 2001. E-mail as habitat: an exploration of embedded personal information management.
