= Yves Guiard =

French neuroscientist

Yves Guiard is a French cognitive neuroscientist and researcher best known for his work in human laterality and stimulus-response compatibility in the field of human-computer interaction. He is the director of research at French National Center for Scientific Research and a member of CHI Academy since 2016. He is also an associate editor of ACM Transactions on Computer-Human Interaction (ACM TOCHI) and member of the advisory council of the International Association for the Study of Attention and Performance.

== Education ==
Guiard received his PhD in cognitive neuroscience from the University of Marseilles. He was elected a French Government Fellow of Churchill College from 1996 till 1997, in Cambridge, UK.

== Work ==
Yves Guiard's research interests span stimulus-response compatibility and the speed/accuracy of trade-off aimed movement. He has designed and tested his novel models of interaction for mobile devices. He proposed a kinematic-chain model in 1987, but the model was only found useful by HCI researchers a decade later when two-handed interaction with the devices was started being researched.

Guiard's HCI Research team at Télécom ParisTech is group is devoted to fundamental and applied research on Human Computer Interaction (HCI). They focus on representing and manipulating big data, and allowing this not only on standard computers but also on small devices – like mobile phones and tablets.

Guiard has published multiple papers regarding the usage of two-handed input while using touch screen based interfaces. His main research topics were around the ability of producing such technology and how usable it is for a given moment in time. As the time passed by, the papers focus on improving currently used designs – like gesture based input on tablets or interaction with different modules of GUI of a modern computer through touch pads.

Guiard has developed a simple model of wrist-wear (Watchit) which implemented basic gesture-based interaction with the wearable. The research surrounding that model has helped the designs and development of the modern smart wearables.

Guiard's publication about the speed/accuracy trade-off of aimed movement goes in depth of how average users interact with common devices – standard computers or mobile phones, and the possibility of developing better designs in order to increase accuracy while not affecting the speed of the input. It explains the mathematics behind common input types and how different designs affect the speed and accuracy.

Guiard is currently working on a book titled "Human Input to Computer Systems: Theories, Techniques and Technology" with William Buxton, where they explain the methods of bringing traditional design skills to interaction design, or the design of user experience.

== Selected bibliography ==
- Guiard, Y., & Rioul, O. (2015). A mathematical description of the speed/accuracy trade-off of aimed movement. In Proceedings of the 2015 British HCI Conference (pp. 91–100). ACM Press.
- Perrault, S. T., Lecolinet, E., Eagan, J., & Guiard, Y. (2013). Watchit: simple gestures and eyes-free interaction for wristwatches and bracelets. In Proceedings of CHI 2013, the SIGCHI Conference on Human Factors in Computing Systems (pp. 1451–1460). ACM Press.
- Guiard, Y., Olafsdottir, H.B., & Perrault, S. (2011). Fitts' law as an explicit time/error trade−off. In Proceedings of CHI 2011, ACM Conference on Human Factors in Computing Systems (pp. 1619–28). New York: Sheridan Press
- Guiard, Y., Du, Y., & Chapuis, O. (2007). Quantifying degree of goal directedness in document navigation: Application to the evaluation of the perspective-drag technique. Proceedings of CHI'2007, ACM Conference on Human Factors in Computing Systems (pp. 327–336). New York : ACM Press.
- Bourgeois, F. & Guiard, Y. (2002). Two-handed input in multiscale pointing. Cahiers de Psychologie Cognitive / Current Psychology of Cognition, 21, 497–518.
- MacKenzie, I. S. & Guiard, Y. (2001). The two-handed desk-top interface : Are we there yet ? Proceedings of CHI’2001, ACM Conference on Human Factors in Computing Systems (pp. 351–352). New York : ACM Press.
- Guiard, Y., Beaudouin-Lafon, M. & Mottet, D. (1999). Navigation as multiscale pointing: extending Fitts’ model to very high precision tasks. Proceedings of CHI’99, ACM Conference on Human Factors in Computing Systems (pp. 450–457). New York : ACM Press.
- Ferrand, T. & Guiard, Y. (1995). Fitts' Law in cooperative two-person aiming. In B. J. Bardy, R. J. Bootsma, & Y. Guiard (Eds.), Studies in perception and action III (pp. 65–68). Hillsdale, NJ: Erlbaum.
- Mottet, D., Bootsma, R. J., Guiard, Y. & Laurent, M. (1994). Fitts' law in two-dimensional task space. Experimental Brain Research, 100, 144–148.
- Guiard, Y. (1988). The kinematic chain as a model for human asymmetrical bimanual cooperation. In A. Colley & J. Beech (Eds.), Cognition and Action in Skilled Behaviour (pp. 205–228). Amsterdam: North-Holland.
