= Andrew Cockburn (computer scientist) =

New Zealand computer scientist

- Education: University of York
- Known for: Human-Computer Interaction
- Scientific career
- Fields: Computer Science
- Workplaces: University of Canterbury
- Website: www.cosc.canterbury.ac.nz/andrew.cockburn/

Andrew Cockburn is currently working as a Professor in the Department of Computer Science and Software Engineering at the University of Canterbury in Christchurch, New Zealand. He is in charge of the Human Computer Interactions Lab where he conducts research focused on designing and testing user interfaces that integrate with inherent human factors.

== Institutions and Affiliations ==
Andrew Cockburn received his Bachelor of Science Degree from the University of York. He obtained his doctorate on Philosophy from the University of Stirling. He currently holds both a teaching and a research post as a Professor of the University of Canterbury. He is the post-graduate co-ordinator and has been conducting both undergraduate and post graduate courses during his tenure. His research in the field of human–computer interaction has led to him publishing more than 150 papers in collaboration with his colleagues and students. He is a current member of the CHI Steering Community responsible for overseeing the activities of all the conference committee chairs. He has been elected as a Co-Technical Program Chair for the ACM CHI2020: Conference on Human Factors in Computing Systems. He also serves as an editorial board member for ACM Transactions on Human-Computer Interaction, Human-Computer Interaction Journal and Foundations and Trends in Human-Computer Interaction.

== Contributions to human-computer interaction ==
Cockburn has made significant contributions to the field of human-computer interaction by designing interfaces that utilize human spatial memory to assist in developing expertise to perform actions such as command invocation, window switching, scrolling and file retrieval. His research on CommandMaps provided data that displayed hierarchical command organization in interfaces tended to be inefficient for experienced users as they were capable for remembering the location of the commands using their spatial memory. His comparative research conducted on navigation-based file retrieval discovered Icon highlights and Hover menus to be greatly efficient compared to the widely used standard icon views when revisiting files. He also developed a new conceptual model of interaction history known as "CAUSALITY." This model records the past commands and states of the artifact it is applied to by the creation of a causal system. The CAUSALITY model is thus shown to be usable with encapsulating existing user interfaces and how it can reveal the limitations in the behavior of the interfaces. He worked on the creation of the SensaBubble, a chrono-sensory mid-air display system that generated scented bubbles to deliver information to the user by a number of sensory modalities. The SensaBubble had the ability to present information both temporally and multimodally and it allowed events to remain perceptible for a longer period of time. Cockburn also studied Shallow Depth 3D Interactions where he examined multiple-touch techniques such as the Three-touch technique on a direct-touch table top display. The study found that increasing the number of touch points can improve user performance and satisfaction and argued in favour of its application in hardware. It also discovered shallow-depth to be a natural environment that people can easily adapt to and understand.

== Notable awards and honours ==
Cockburn has received multiple awards for his contribution to human-computer interaction related research. He was awarded entry into the CHI Academy in the 2015 SIGCHI Awards in Seoul, Korea for the substantial contributions he made to the field of human-computer interactions. He has received the CHI Best Paper Award on two separate occasions, in 2012 for his paper titled, "Improving Command Selection With CommandMaps" and in 2013 for his paper titled, "Improving navigation-based file retrieval." He has also received the CHI Honorable Mention Award for eight other CHI conference papers. In 2017, he received $200,000 in the National Science Challenge Science for Technological Innovation (SfTI) Seed fund for his research to develop better in-vehicle touchscreens. He has been inducted as head of the Canterbury HCI research group.
