= Elisabeth André =

German Computer Scientist

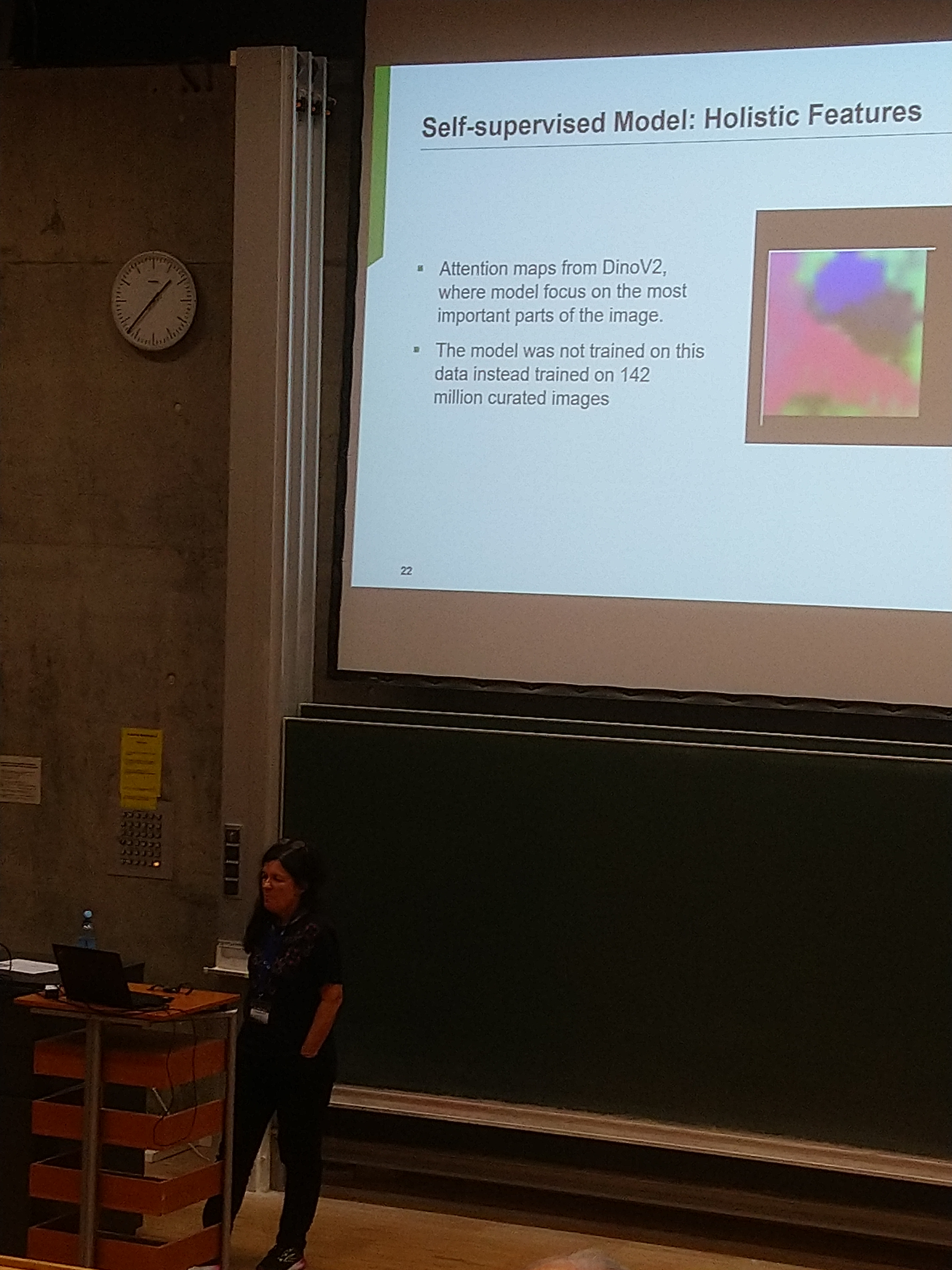
- Elisabeth André at the German AI conference (2024)
- Born: 3 November 1961
- Education: Saarland University
- Known for: Intelligent User Interfaces; Virtual Agents; Social Computing
- Awards: Leibniz Prize
- Scientific career
- Workplaces: University of Augsburg; DFKI
- Thesis: Ein planbasierter Ansatz zur Generierung multimedialer Präsentationen (1995)
- Doctoral advisor: Wolfgang Wahlster

Elisabeth André is a German computer scientist from Saarlouis, Saarland who specializes in intelligent user interfaces, virtual agents, and social computing.

== Education ==
- 1988—Computer Science diploma at the University of Saarland
- 1995—Computer Science PhD at the University of Saarland

André's research interests include Affective Computing, Embodied Conversational Agents, Multimodal Human-Machine Interaction, and Social Signal Processing.

== Career ==
- 1988–2001—Research associate at the German Research Center for Artificial Intelligence
- 1995—Senior researcher
- 1999—Principal researcher at the German Research Center for Artificial Intelligence in Saarbrücken, Germany
- 2001–present—Computer Science professor and the Founding Chair of Human-Centered Multimedia at the University of Augsburg.
- 2004–2006—Managing Director at the Institute of Computer Science at the University of Augsburg
- 2007—Representative of the German Research Foundation on Artificial Intelligence, Image, and Speech Processing
- 2008–present—German Research Foundation review board member

André was also the General and Program Co-Chair for multiple ACM SIGCHI conferences.

== Achievements ==
- 1995—European Information Technology Information Award
- 1998—RoboCup Scientific Award
- 2000—Best Paper Award for the International Conference of Intelligent User
- 2005—Convivio Best Demo Award for People-Centered Agent Technologies
- 2007—Alcatel-Lucent Fellowship at the International Center for Arts and Culture
- 2007, 2008, 2009—Best Paper Finalist at the International Conference on Intelligent Virtual Agents
- 2010—Elected to Academia Europaea
- 2017—Elected to CHI Academy
