= Wendy Ju =

American roboticist

- Citizenship: American
- Education: Stanford University(undergraduate & doctorate) Massachusetts Institute of Technology(Masters)
- Occupations: roboticist, researcher, academic
- Title: Professor

Wendy G. Ju is an American roboticist and scholar of human–robot interaction. Her research has included studying the interactions between pedestrians and autonomous vehicles, and between people and robot garbage cans in public spaces. She is an associate professor of information science at the Jacobs Technion-Cornell Institute of Cornell Tech in New York City, a joint partnership of Cornell University and the Technion – Israel Institute of Technology; she is also affiliated with Cornell's Ann S. Bowers College of Computing and Information Science and with the Technion.

== Education and career ==
Ju was an undergraduate student of mechanical engineering at Stanford University, graduating in 1997. After a 2001 master's degree in media arts and sciences at the Massachusetts Institute of Technology, advised by Michael Hawley, she returned to Stanford for a doctorate in mechanical engineering, supervised by Larry Leifer and completed in 2008.

From 2009 to 2013 she continued at Stanford as a postdoctoral researcher in the Computer Science Department and Center for Design Research, working there with both Laufer and Terry Winograd. Meanwhile, from 2008 to 2017 she held an assistant and associate professorship in design at the California College of the Arts in San Francisco. From 2013 to 2017 she was executive director for interaction design research at the Stanford Center for Design Research.

She joined Cornell Tech as an assistant professor in 2018, and was promoted to associate professor in 2020. In 2022 she added an affiliation with the new Cornell University Design Tech department, and in 2023 she added another affiliation as an associate professor in the Faculty of Architecture and Town Planning at the Technion.

== Book ==
Ju is the author of the book The Design of Implicit Interactions (Synthesis Lectures on Human-Centered Informatics, Springer, 2015, doi:10.1007/978-3-031-02210-4). It is based on her doctoral dissertation, which had the same title.

== Recognition ==
Ju was named to the CHI Academy in 2025.
