= Anna Cox =

British neuroscientist

Anna Louise Cox
- Education: University of Hertfordshire; Queen Mary University of London
- Scientific career
- Workplaces: University College London
- Thesis: Exploratory learning of interactive devices : what people do and what people learn (2002)

Anna Louise Cox is a British Professor of Human Computer Interaction in the University College London Faculty of Brain Sciences. Her research considers evidence-based approaches to reduce work-related stress and remain focussed through the use of digital technology. Cox serves as Vice Dean for Equality, Diversity & Inclusion and was an advisor to the House of Commons Digital, Culture, Media and Sport Committee for their select committee enquiry on immersive and addictive technologies.

== Early life and education ==
Cox became interested in science as a child. Her father was a science teacher. Cox studied cognitive science at the University of Hertfordshire. She moved to Queen Mary University of London for her graduate studies, where she focussed on human–computer interaction. Cox returned to the University of Hertfordshire for her doctoral research, where she studied exploratory learning using interactive devices.

== Research and career ==
In 2004, Cox was appointed to the faculty at the University College London Interaction Centre. In 2016, Cox became network Director of Get A Move On, a programme that looks to engage young people, office workers and older adults with digital technologies that benefit their health. She was promoted to Professor in 2017. Her research considers how people interact with technology, and how these interactions impact their lives.

Cox has investigated e-mails, mindfulness apps and digital games. Early in her career, she demonstrated that playing digital games can serve to dissipate work stress. She has shown that people who receive constant, attention-seeking notifications are more likely to make mistakes or achieve their objectives. She proposed that to mitigate digital addiction and the obsessive compulsion to check social media, people should introduce micro-boundaries, such as removing their smart watches when they get home. Cox studied the etiquette of e-mailing, and how people make decisions to prioritise their responses. She has argued that employers and employees should have discussions about expectations around e-mail usage. Cox has promoted the use of an Email Charter to help to mitigate the overwhelming number of e-mails people receive in the modern world.

== Academic service ==
Cox has worked to improve gender equality in the sciences throughout her academic career. She led the Division of Psychology & Language Sciences in furthering gender equality. Under her leadership, Cox achieved several silver level Athena SWAN awards. Cox serves as Vice Dean for Equality, Diversity & Inclusion.

Cox is the Chair of Governors at Sandringham School. In 2019 Cox was appointed a specialist advisor to the House of Commons Digital, Culture, Media and Sport Committee. In this capacity, she advised the government on the uses of immersive technologies and how technology can become addictive.

== Selected publications ==
- Jennett, Charlene; Cox, Anna L.; Cairns, Paul; Dhoparee, Samira; Epps, Andrew; Tijs, Tim; Walton, Alison (2008). "Measuring and defining the experience of immersion in games". International Journal of Human-Computer Studies. 66 (9): 641–661. doi:10.1016/j.ijhcs.2008.04.004. ISSN 1071-5819. S2CID 1462839.
- Adams, Anne; Cox, Anna L. (2008). "Questionnaires, in-depth interviews and focus groups". Research Methods for Human–Computer Interaction (PDF). Cambridge: Cambridge University Press. pp. 17–34. doi:10.1017/cbo9780511814570.003. ISBN 978-0-511-81457-0.
- Cairns, Paul; Cox, Anna L., eds. (2008). Research Methods for Human–Computer Interaction. Cambridge: Cambridge University Press. doi:10.1017/cbo9780511814570. ISBN 978-0-511-81457-0.
