= Morten Kyng =

Danish researcher

Morten Kyng (born 23 October 1950) is a Danish computer science researcher and author. He is a member of Association of Computing Machinery's Computer-Human Interaction Academy member. He is a ubiquitous computing professor at Aarhus University. He is a Member of Board of Directors of Østjysk Innovation and the Director of the Centre for Pervasive Healthcare, a research centre that studies the use of pervasive computer technologies to provide healthcare solutions.

== Career ==
Kyng served as the Director for Caretech Innovation, supporting information technology innovations for healthcare, and as the Director of It-vest - Networking Universities.

=== Telemedicine ===
His current project at the Alexandra Institute is "Denmark - a Pioneer in Telemedicine", a collaboration of The Alexandra Institute, DELTA, Danish Technological Institute and FORCE Technology aiming to further develop healthcare using telemedicine to enable patients to receive medical visits at home instead of traveling to a healthcare institution. It is a collection of open source code technologies and technical interfaces that enable interaction between healthcare information technology systems, enhancing the interaction between business and software.

He has performed research on the requirements for a software-intensive ecosystem for telemedicine. He identified security concerns and access control for healthcare professionals instead of citizens, as issues in today's telemedical healthcare services. Using healthcare virtual private networks to provide services that require large and complicated health standards causes a slowdown. Limiting access from citizens also limits access to initiatives between public and private health sectors.

To provide more flexible healthcare technology development, the Net4Care project was created as an application-centric ecosystem for telemedicine in which:

- Standards are supported by reference implementations.
- The quality of open source services is properly controlled.
- Access control allows for both healthcare professionals and citizens.

=== Participatory design ===
Some of Kyng's work focuses on the flaws and potential improvements of participatory design in today's healthcare information technology. His expertise reaches both the healthcare and business sectors of Denmark, specifically the community of Aarhus. His work includes research on healthcare solutions using pervasive computing, the embedding and use of sensor technology in everyday life. In his research, he identified the challenges of participatory design intended for private homes, particularly for senior citizens with chronic dizziness, as opposed to participatory design intended for workplaces. The four challenges are designing the home, participation of ill and weak users in participatory design, conflicting interests of the user, and finding a usable and sustainable solution.

=== Emergency response systems ===
He studied the challenges of designing interactive emergency response systems. One challenge is the dynamic environment of an emergency situation that makes it difficult for healthcare personnel to operate and collaborate while maintaining a clear situational overview. Another common challenge is the common use of face-to-face communication in onsite emergencies when different services cannot communicate with each other by radio. He proposes to mitigate these challenges by having each emergency response professional use a wireless device with which they can create a shared information space with data such as bio-sensor data, victim identification and aerial photos. This device should ideally be usable outdoors and at night, varying in size to suit both co-located and distributed users.
