= Gloria Mark =

American psychologist

- Education: Columbia University; University of Michigan
- Known for: Social computing Computer-supported cooperative work (CSCW)
- Scientific career
- Fields: Human-computer interaction Informatics
- Workplaces: University of California, Irvine; Microsoft Research; MIT Media Lab; National University of Singapore; University of Haifa; IBM Haifa

Gloria Janet Mark is an American psychologist. She is Chancellor's professor in the Department of Informatics at University of California, Irvine. She is the author of the 2023 book, Attention Span, has published over 200 scientific research articles and is noted for her research on Social computing and the social impacts of Digital media. In 2017, she was inducted into the CHI Academy for her contributions to the field of Human-computer interaction.

== Education ==
She earned her PhD in psychology from Columbia University in 1991 and her M.S. in biostatistics from the University of Michigan.

== Career and research ==
=== Research ===
Mark is an active researcher on human-computer interaction with her primary research revolving around social computing. In particular, her research interests have led to a variety of investigations of individuals and their workplace environment.

Some of her most notable findings include the effects of multitasking on millennial college students in the digital workplace. Correlations were drawn from stress, time spent at a computer and multitasking as there was a measure of the subjects’ mood and stress using biosensors and logging computer activity. In 2004, Mark published a CHI paper that argued that the design of information technology in the workplace is not optimal for a worker's work organization. It suggests that the worker naturally organizes their work in a manner that is much larger in connected units of work than the intended IT design – known as a working sphere. Her 2005 CHI paper investigates the high frequency of work fragmentation among information workers and its implications on technological design. She also published a paper that thoroughly examines contextual reasoning on an information worker's attention state. Among others, it was found that the workplace has more focused attention than boredom and that workers are the happiest when undergoing rote work.

=== Career ===
- Mark is the author of Attention Span, published in 2023 by HarperCollins. This book describes her decades-long research into how our attention spans on our devices have been shrinking, and how people can achieve control in their behaviors.
- In 2017 Mark was inducted into the ACM CHI Academy, which honors leaders in the field of human-computer interaction.
- Mark is currently an associate editor of ACM Transactions on Computer-Human Interaction (ACM TOCHI) and Human-Computer Interaction journals - a peer-reviewed scientific journal whose focus is to publish high-quality scientific papers pertaining to innovative technology, Human-computer interaction and interactive design. In 2017, she served an associate chair of the ACM CHI conference.
- She has been a professor at University of California, Irvine, in the Department of Informatics since 2007. Prior to that, she was an assistant professor from 2000 to 2003 and an associate professor from 2003 to 2007 at the same department.
- She is the author of Multitasking in the Digital Age, a book that thoroughly examines different views of multitasking and the extent to which it effects an information worker.
- Mark is a senior visiting researcher at Microsoft Research, a position she has held since 2012.

Mark's work has been covered in major news outlets such as The New York Times, The Wall Street Journal, The Atlantic, NPR, and the BBC. She has also presented at the SXSW and Aspen Ideas festivals.

== Notable honors and awards ==
Mark was awarded the Best CHI paper in 2014 and the Google Research Award in 2011 and 2014. She is recognized with a Columbia University Graduate Fellowship and received a Fulbright Scholarship from Humboldt University in 2006. Furthermore, Mark was a recipient of the National Science Foundation Career Grant for her work from 2001 to 2006 and in 2004–05, she was awarded the Outstanding Graduate Student Mentor Award from the Donald Bren School of Information and Computer Sciences. Mark has been recognized for her significant career contributions to research as she received the UCI ICS Dean's Mid-Career Award for Research in 2015 and inducted to the CHI Academy in 2017.
