= Cultural probe =

Design method

Cultural probes (or design probes) is a technique used to inspire ideas in a design process. It serves as a means of gathering inspirational data about people's lives, values and thoughts. The probes are small packages that can include any sort of artifact (like a map, postcard, camera or diary) along with evocative tasks, which are given to participants to allow them to record specific events, feelings or interactions. The aim is to elicit inspirational responses from people, in order to understand their culture, thoughts and values better, and thus stimulate designer's imaginations. Probes is one of the prominent approaches in the practice of co-designing. It is design-led approaches as described by the landscape of design research and practice. Probes are usually used in the early front end of the design process. The probes were not designed to be analyzed, nor did we summarize what they revealed about the sites as an explicit stage in the process. Rather, the design proposals we produced reflected what we learned from the materials. Furthermore, probes were born to gather “fragmentary clues” about people’s “lives and thoughts” which means they are tools to inspire - others argue that they can be used to, provide relevant information and gather empathetic data.

== Background ==
Cultural Probes was developed by Gaver, Dunne and Pacenti in 1999. They were inspired by the art movement Situationist International. This technique does not follow the scientific approach. It follows the artistic approach, which is characterized by being irrational, uncontrolled, getting inspiration, and cannot be analysed systematically. As Gaver pointed out, the conceptual concerns and specific techniques of various arts movements also influenced their probes design.

== Applications ==
Cultural probes can be used for idea generation, inspiration, values and dreams in a design process. The technique is about opening up the design space, instead of narrowing it. Cultural probes aim to seek out subjective thoughts, values and dreams and surprise and uncertainty is a key value. The probes provoke inspirational responses by using a creative approach in questions instead of analytical and descriptive question usually asked in User Experience Research. Cultural Probe kit is a vehicle for self-reporting by asking participants to observe, reflect upon and report their experiences which can lead to have better and deeper observation in a context where, due to privacy as well as time constraints, it is not possible to conduct full participant observations.

Since the initial publication in 1999 of cultural probes in interactions, the use of probes has been interpreted broadly and used in a wide variety of projects within user experience. Some cases are grounded very much in the original cultural probes work, while, in other cases, ‘probes’ has become an umbrella term covering everything from Diary Studies to longitudinal user studies to field trips.

In the traditional design process, designers usually engage in making after the design opportunity has already been identified. Over the last 10 years, we have seen the focus shift to more varied forms and formats of making in the front end of the process. Today making has become an activity that both designers and co-designers can engage in during all phases of the process. Cultural probe is one of these making approaches, which is used in the very earliest phase of the design process, the focus is on using making activities for making sense of the future.

== Probes' family ==
Since Bill Gaver and his colleagues developed ‘Cultural Probes’, they have been adopted and adapted [10]. Here are some probes which are derived from Cultural Probes; Informational Probes, Technology Probes, Mobile Probes, Empathy Probes, Domestic Probes, Urban Probes, Reflective Probes, Primitive Probes. Each kinds of Probes bring users to account to members differently: for example, probes that log everyday actions do this quite differently from those that require describing dreams. Each makes different forms of action and interaction visible and in different ways. Most forms of Probes involve investigative participation. Participants engage in reflective participation – both in the standard sociological sense of becoming aware of actions and interactions and describing them in some way, and in the methodological sense of making actions accountable. However, there is also evidence of different forms of participation. Cultural Probes emphasis imaginative and playful participation, engaging participants in activities that promote the use of aspects of their lives that are more “ludic’ and less goal-driven. Empathy Probes emphasis emotional participation, seeking out participants’ effective responses both to things in their everyday lives and new technologies. Both Technology Probes and Mobile Probes emphasis reactive participation and, to some extent, a change in participation or disruptive participation. Participants have to react to these new technologies placed in their lives and to the disruption to their existing routines that they enforce.

== After Probing ==
Probing will add strong element of making to the research which is based on literature and practical work. It is difficult to create a precise pattern of the design process for probes. "The problem and the solution go hand in hand, and there is no single answer or method for analyses the probe materials. An inspiring idea about things such as the overall appearance of the probe, a single probe article or a visual detail can tune up the probe design along with a consistent approach to the problem. Although the methodological instructions can in principle be taken to the extreme, the outcome finally depends on the agents, i.e., researchers, designers and even users in the case of probes. Practical instructions are helpful, but somebody conducting research must personally be tuned-in to receive signals, interpret them and be surprised at them, as well as tolerate the ambiguous nature of the probing process (and design)".

== Criticism ==
- It is hard to get scientifically valid information from data that is so subjective.
- The data generated is not suitable for deep analysis and requirements list.
- Participants are supposed to reflect upon and be inspired by the probes, but it can be hard to motivate participants doing it, as well as to get them to send the probes back.
- There is a risk of few returns.
- The wide variety of applications of and scientific approach to the probes has been criticized by Gaver and his colleagues as a misunderstood desire to rationalize and analyze the probes.
