= Abigail Sellen =

Computer scientist

Abigail Sellen FRS FREng FBCS
- Born: Abigail Jane Sellen
- Education: University of Toronto (MSc); University of California, San Diego (PhD)
- Awards: ACM Fellow (2016); CHI Academy (2011)
- Scientific career
- Fields: Human–computer interaction
- Workplaces: Microsoft Research; University of Cambridge; University College London; Xerox PARC; Apple Inc. HP Labs
- Thesis: Mechanisms of human error and human error detection (1990)
- Academic advisors: Don Norman
- Website: www.microsoft.com/en-us/research/people/asellen/

Abigail Jane Sellen is a Canadian cognitive scientist, industrial engineer, and computer scientist who works for Microsoft Research in Cambridge. She is also an honorary professor at the University of Nottingham and University College London.

== Education ==
Sellen earned a master's degree in industrial engineering from the University of Toronto, and a PhD in cognitive science from the University of California, San Diego under the supervision of Don Norman.

== Career and research ==
Sellen's research investigates human–computer interaction (HCI). She has worked as a research fellow at Darwin College, Cambridge as well as for various corporate research laboratories including Xerox PARC, Apple Inc., and HP Labs before joining Microsoft in 2004.

With Richard H. R. Harper, Sellen wrote The Myth of the Paperless Office (MIT Press, 2001).

=== Awards and honours ===
She is a fellow of the Royal Society (FRS), the Royal Academy of Engineering (FREng) and the British Computer Society. She was inducted into the CHI Academy in 2011. In 2016 she became a fellow of the Association for Computing Machinery (ACM) "for contributions to human-computer interaction and the design of human-centered technology". She was elected as a foreign member of the National Academy of Engineering in 2020, for "contributions that ensure consideration of human capabilities in the design of computer systems".
