= Sharon Oviatt =

Canadian computer scientist

Sharon Oviatt is an internationally recognized computer scientist, professor and researcher known for her work in the field of human–computer interaction on human-centered multimodal interface design and evaluation.

== Education ==
Sharon Oviatt received her PhD in Experimental Psychology at the University of Toronto.

== Career ==
Oviatt has published 200 scientific publications in the HCI field and human-centered A.I., and worked as a Professor of Computer Science, Psychology and Linguistics at several different universities. She has served as an editor for the major HCI journals in the field including Human Computer Interaction and Interactive Intelligent Systems (TIIS), and she chaired the International Conference on Multimodal Interfaces in 2003. She is a former Professor and Co-Director at the Center for Human-Computer Communication (CHCC) in the Department of Computer Science at Oregon Health & Science University. She served as the President and Chair of the Board of Directors of Incaa Designs, a non-profit with the aim of researching and designing new educational interfaces. She is also a Professor of HCI and Creative Technologies at Monash University in Melbourne, Australia. Much of her research is focused on examining the effectiveness of speech and pen interfaces in educational settings.

== Research ==
Oviatt's main areas of research are human-centered, multimodal, mobile and educational interfaces. Her work at Incaa Designs was centered on designing and evaluating the effects of new educational interfaces. It particular, it aimed to develop educational interfaces that allowed students to learn more effectively with fewer distractions.

=== Human-centered design ===
Oviatt is an advocate of human-centered design. In her paper “User-centered modeling and evaluation of multimodal interfaces”, she describes most past computer interface design as being technologically driven and claims that these designers first built their interfaces and then taught users how to interact with them. In contrast, human-centered design relies on cognitive science research to inform designers about the most effective ways for individuals to naturally interact with their interfaces.

=== Pen interfaces ===
The effectiveness of pen interfaces on a student's ability to learn is one of Oviatt's major areas of research. In 2012 she co-authored a paper on “The impact of interface affordances on human ideation, problem solving, and inferential reasoning” which found that student who used a pen used 56% more diagrams, symbols and other pictorial representations compared to those who used a keyboard. This corresponded to a 38.5% increase in these students' ability to express scientific ideas. The researchers found that digital pen inputs allowed students even more accuracy when it came to their diagrams, and further reduced the number of vague generalizations students had to make while taking notes.

In another paper entitled “Toward High-Performance Communications Interfaces for Science Problem Solving”, Oviatt and her co-author Adrienne Cohen found that low-performing students performed better using of a pen and paper compared with a tablet and pen, graphical interface, or digital paper and pen.

=== Speech Interfaces ===
Oviatt has authored numerous papers on using speech to interact with electronic devices. In one study she co-authored, “Toward adaptive conversational interfaces: Modeling speech convergence with animated personas”, 24 children were given a variety of different animated characters to converse with. This study found that as the children interacted with these animated characters, their intonation and style of speaking began to resemble these characters’ ways of speaking. The researchers’ stated long term goal was for this convergence in speaking to be used to design more responsive and accurate conversational interfaces.

== Awards ==
- 2016: ACM award for contributions to the foundations of multimodal systems and human-centered computer interfaces. (awarded to the top 1% of computer scientists worldwide)
- 2015: SigCHI Academy Award for her work in human-centered and multimodal interfaces (awarded to the top 1% of HCI professionals worldwide)
- 2014: International Conference on Multimodal Interaction (ICMI) Sustained Accomplishment Award for significant contributions to the field of multimodal and multimedia interaction, interfaces, and systems.
- 2000: National Science Foundation Creativity Award for pioneering research on mobile multimodal interfaces.

== Notable works ==
- 2017, 2018, 2019: The Handbook of Multimodal Interfaces, ACM Press, 3-volume handbook co-edited with B. Schuller, P. Cohen, D. Sonntag, G. Potamianos & A. Kruger
- 2015: The Paradigm Shift to Multimodality in Contemporary Computer Interfaces (co-authored with Phil Cohen).
- 2013: The Design of Future Educational Interfaces (Routledge Press).
