= Steven M. Drucker =

American computer scientist

Steven Mark Drucker is an American computer scientist who studies how to help people understand data, and communicate their insights to others. He was a partner at Microsoft Research, where he also served as the research manager of the VIDA (Visualization and Data Analysis) group. Drucker is an affiliate professor at the University of Washington Computer Science and Engineering Department.

== Education ==
Drucker received his Ph.D. from the Computer Graphics and Animation Group at the MIT Media Lab in May 1994, where he studied improvements to controlling cameras in synthetic environments. He graduated Magna Cum Laude with Honors in Neurosciences from Brown University, and earned his Master's degree in robot learning at the MIT Artificial Intelligence Laboratory.

== Scientific contributions ==
Drucker developed the SandDance system for information visualization. SandDance provides a web interface to explore, animate, and communicate insights into complex datasets. The system is designed to facilitate discovery of patterns and trends in data by displaying it in ways that complement the pattern-finding systems in the human visual system.

Drucker contributed to the growth of e-sports by designing a robust system that allows spectators to enjoy watching others play competitive video games. His related work on automatic camera control leveraged decades of art and experience in video and film to create engaging, real-time choices for camera placement and motion in any synthetic environment, such as video games.

Drucker has participated in the development of multiple systems designed to help understand the results of machine learning algorithms by using novel visualizations.

Drucker has helped to develop visualization tools for a wide variety of applications, such as interpreting data in virtual reality, filtering trajectories in virtual reality, and pen-and-touch interfaces.

== Recognition ==
- ACM SIGCHI CHI Academy
- Papers Chair for ACM SIGCHI 2022
- Papers Chair for ACM SIGCHI 2021
