= Sunny Consolvo =

American computer scientist

Sunny Consolvo is an American computer scientist who works on digital safety and human–computer interaction at Google Research.

== Education and career ==
Consolvo received her Ph.D. in 2008 from the University of Washington Information School. Her dissertation, Designing and Evaluating a Persuasive Technology to Encourage Lifestyle Behavior Change, was supervised by David W. McDonald.

She co-founded e-commerce developer Propel in Silicon Valley, and worked for Intel in Seattle, Washington, before moving to her present position at Google.

== Recognition ==
Consolvo was named to the CHI Academy in 2020. She was given the 2022 Distinguished Alumni Award of the University of Washington Information School.
