= Richard H. R. Harper =

Richard H. R. Harper is a British computer scientist and prolific author.

== Career ==
He served as Professor in the Department of Computing and Communications at Lancaster University and Co-Director of the Institute for Social Futures. He has published over 160 scientific articles and was elected as Academy in honour of leadership in the field of Human-Computer Interaction by the Association for Computing Machinery in 2014. He completed his Phd at University of Manchester in 1989. In the late 20th century, he focused on deploying technology in public service and air traffic control. He studied how technology was embedded at the International Monetary Fund. At the turn of the 21st century, he researched remote communication and digital office. One of his publications was the Institute of Electrical and Electronics Engineers award-winning "The Myth of the Paperless Office". His research ranges from the social impact of new technology to the design of a mobile phone. Later, he focused on artificial intelligence.

Co-director of the Institute for Social Futures (ISF) (2017), owner of Social Shaping Research Ltd consulting service, Principal Researcher at Microsoft Research Cambridge (2004 - 2015), first professor of Socio-Digital Systems at the University of Surrey (2002) and research lead of Xerox EuroPARC (1990 - 1998).

== Recognition ==
- Leadership in the field of Human-Computer Interaction by ACM (2014)
- Computer Human Interaction Academy by SIGCHI (2014)
- "The Myth of the Paperless Office", IEEE Award for Distinguished Literary Contributions Furthering Engineering Professionalism
- “Texture”, Award of the Society of Internet Researcher's 'Book of the Year (2011)
- Elected a Fellow of the Royal Society of Arts (2011)
