= Albrecht Schmidt (computer scientist) =

German computer scientist (born 1970)

- Born: October 15, 1970 (age 56); Crailsheim, Germany
- Education: University of Ulm
- Awards: CHI Academy
- Scientific career
- Fields: Human-Computer Interaction, Ubiquitous Computing,
- Workplaces: Lancaster University; LMU Munich; University of Bonn; University of Duisburg-Essen; University of Stuttgart
- Thesis: Ubiquitous Computing - Computing in Context (2002)
- Doctoral advisor: Hans-Werner Gellersen
- Website: albrecht-schmidt.blogspot.com

Albrecht Schmidt (born 1970) is a computer scientist best known for his work in ubiquitous computing, pervasive computing, and the tangible user interface. He is a professor at LMU Munich where he joined the faculty in 2017.

== Biography ==
=== Professional career ===
Albrecht Schmidt received an M.Sc. in computing from Manchester Metropolitan University (UK) in 1996. His master thesis was on modular neural networks. In 1997, he finished his master's degree in computer science at the University of Ulm (Germany). As a research assistant Schmidt was working towards a PhD at Telecooperation Office (TecO), University of Karlsruhe (Germany) from 1998 to 2001. He continued his study at Lancaster University (UK) to finish his PhD. Schmidt's PhD thesis was titled Ubiquitous Computing - Computing in Context. Schmidt transferred to LMU Munich (Germany) in 2003, where he led the Emmy-Noether Research Group 'Embedded Interaction'. He was appointed professor for applied computer science/media informatics at the University of Bonn and simultaneously served as department manager at the Fraunhofer Institute for Intelligent Analysis and Information Systems (IAIS). From October 2007 to December 2010, he took the position as chair for pervasive computing at University of Duisburg-Essen. From January 2011 to August 2017, Schmidt directed the 'Human-Computer Interaction' research group at the Institut für Visualisierung und Interaktive Systeme at University of Stuttgart. Since October 2017, he has been the head professor of the research group 'Human Centered Ubiquitous Media Group' at the Department of Computer Science at LMU Munich.

== Recognition ==
Schmidt was elected to the CHI Academy in 2018 and to the German National Academy of Sciences Leopoldina in 2020. In 2023, Schmidt received the recognition of being named a Fellow of the Association for Computing Machinery (ACM).

== Selected bibliography ==
- A. Schmidt, M. Beigl, H.W. Gellersen: "There is more to context than location", In: Computers & Graphics 23 (6), 893–90, 1999
- A. Schmidt, K. Aidoo, A. Takaluoma, U. Tuomela, K. Van Laerhoven, W. Van de Velde: "Advanced interaction in context", In: Handheld and Ubiquitous Computing, 89-101, 1999
- A. Schmidt: "Implicit human computer interaction through context", In: Personal and Ubiquitous Computing 4 (2), 191–199, 2000
- H.W. Gellersen, A. Schmidt, M. Beigl: "Multi-sensor context-awareness in mobile devices and smart artifacts", In: Mobile Networks and Applications 7 (5), 341–351, 2002
- M. Beigl, H.W. Gellersen, A. Schmidt: "Mediacups: experience with design and use of computer-augmented everyday artefacts", In: Computer Networks 35 (4), 401–409, 2001
- A. Schmidt: "Ubiquitous computing-computing in context" (Ph.D. thesis), 2002
- A. Schmidt, K Van Laerhoven: "How to build smart appliances?", In: Personal Communications, IEEE 8 (4), 66-71 2001
- N. Kern, B. Schiele, A. Schmidt: "Multi-sensor activity context detection for wearable computing", In: Ambient Intelligence, 220–232, 2003
- W.W. Gaver, J. Bowers, A. Boucher, H. Gellersen, S. Pennington, A. Schmidt, A. Steed, N. Villar, B. Walker: "The drift table: designing for ludic engagement", In: ACM, 2004
- M. Kranz, P. Holleis, A. Schmidt: "Embedded Interaction - Interacting with the Internet of Things", In: IEEE Internet Computing, vol. 14, no. 2, pp. 46–53, March–April 2010
- M. Kranz, A. Schmidt, A. Maldonado, R.B. Rusu, M. Beetz, B. Hörnler, G. Rigoll: "Context-Aware Kitchen Utilities", In: Proceedings of the 1st International Conference on Tangible and Embedded Interaction (TEI2007), pp. 213–214, Baton Rouge, Louisiana, USA, February 2007
- M. Kranz, A. Schmidt, R.B. Rusu, A. Maldonado, M. Beetz, B. Hörnler, G. Rigoll: "Sensing Technologies and the Player-Middleware for Context-Awareness in Kitchen Environments", In: Proceedings of the 4th International Conference on Networked Sensing Systems' (INSS2007), pp. 179–186, Brunswick, Germany, June 2007
- L. Terrenghi, M. Kranz, P. Holleis, A. Schmidt: "A cube to learn: a tangible user interface for the design of a learning appliance", In: Personal and Ubiquitous Computing, vol. 10, no. 2–3, pp. 153–158, 2006
- A. Schmidt, M. Kranz, P. Holleis: "Interacting with the ubiquitous computer: towards embedding interaction", In: Proceedings of the Joint Conference on Smart Objects and Ambient Intelligence (sOc-EUSAI2005), pp. 147–152, Grenoble, France, October 2005
