= Alan Dix =

- Occupation: University Professor
- Known for: Human-Computer Interaction (HCI)
- Website: https://alandix.com/

Alan John Dix FCBS FLSW is a British author, researcher, and university professor, specialising in human–computer interaction (HCI). He is one of the four co-authors of the university level textbook Human–Computer Interaction. Dix is the Director of the Computational Foundry at Swansea University, since May 2018. He was previously a professor at Lancaster University.

In 2021, he was elected a Fellow of the Learned Society of Wales.

== Publications ==
=== Books ===
- Dix, Alan; Finlay, Janet E.; Abowd, Gregory D.; Beale, Russell (20 December 2003). Human-Computer Interaction (3 ed.). Pearson Education. ISBN 9780130461094.
- Dix, Alan; Finlay, Janet E.; Abowd, Gregory D.; Beale, Russell (12 January 1998). Human-Computer Interaction (2 ed.). Prentice Hall. ISBN 0132398648.
- Dix, Alan; Finlay, Janet E.; Abowd, Gregory D.; Beale, Russell (1993). Human-Computer Interaction (1 ed.). Prentice Hall. ISBN 9780134582665.
- Dix, Alan; Finlay, Janet E. (29 June 1996). An Introduction To Artificial Intelligence (1st ed.). CRC Press. ISBN 9781857283990.
- Dix, Alan (1991). Formal Methods for Interactive Systems. Elsevier. ISBN 978-0-12-218315-7.

=== Contributions ===
- Diaper, D.; Winder, R., eds. (1987). "Myth of the Infinitely Fast Machine". People and Computers III. Cambridge University Press. pp. 215–228. ISBN 9780521351973. This book contains a chapter written by Dix, in summary from the 1987 British Computer Society of Human-Computer Interaction held at University of Exeter.
