= Tom Rodden =

British computer scientist

Professor Tom Rodden CBE FRS FREng FAcSS FBCS
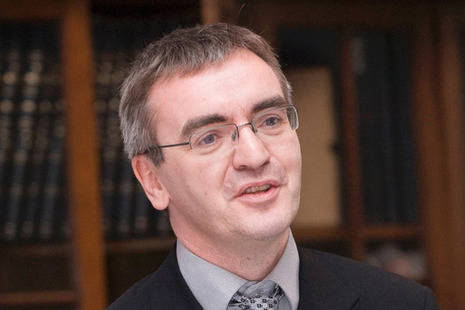
- Education: Lancaster University
- Known for: Human computer interaction, Computer supported cooperative work, Ubiquitous computing
- Scientific career
- Workplaces: University of Nottingham
- Thesis: Supporting cooperation in software engineering environments (1990)
- Website: www.nottingham.ac.uk/computerscience/people/tom.rodden

Thomas Anthony Rodden is Pro-Vice-Chancellor of Research & Knowledge Exchange and Professor of Computing at the University of Nottingham. He was previously Chief Scientific Adviser for the UK Government’s Department for Culture, Media and Sport from 2019 to 2023. Before that, he was Deputy Chief Executive of the Engineering and Physical Sciences Research Council (EPSRC). In 2008, as a member of the UK Research Assessment Exercise 2008 computing panel, he was responsible for assessing the international quality of computer science research across all UK departments. In 2014, he served in the Research Excellence Framework assessment panel for computing and he was the deputy chair of the Hong Kong RAE 2014 computing panel.

== Awards and honours ==
Rodden was elected a Fellow of the ACM in 2014 for contributions to ubiquitous computing, and computer supported cooperative work. He was elected a Fellow of the Royal Academy of Engineering in 2018, elected a Fellow of the Academy of Social Sciences in 2020, and elected a Fellow of the Royal Society in 2024. He was appointed CBE in the 2025 New Year Honours for services to science, to technology and to academia.
