= Leysia Palen =

American computer scientist

Leysia Palen is an American computer scientist known for her contributions to human–computer interaction and disaster informatics. She is a professor of computer science, professor of information science, and founding chair of information science at the University of Colorado Boulder. At Colorado, she directs a research project titled "Empowering the Public with Information during Crisis", and is co-director of the Center for Software & Society. She also holds an adjunct affiliation with the University of Agder, and is a member of the CHI Academy.

== Contributions ==
Palen's research involves searching for "ways in which we can communicate uncertainty and probability and risk to the public" and translating that information into recommendations on how disaster victims should respond. She has also studied the ways that people use social media during disasters. According to Palen, the first uses of these platforms in these ways came during the 2004 Indian Ocean earthquake and tsunami, and their use has become much more widespread since then. Her tips for using social media in emergency situations include being specific about locations and conditions, avoiding trying to remain emotionless and unaffected, and helping to gather and check information when not directly affected.

== Education and career ==
Palen studied computer science and psychology at the University of Stirling from 1988 to 1989, and graduated in 1991 from the University of California, San Diego with a bachelor's degree in cognitive science. After working for two years for Boeing, she returned to graduate study at the University of California, Irvine, in what at that time was the Department of Information and Computer Science, earning a master's degree in 1995 and a Ph.D. in 1998. Her work in this time frame also included internships at Microsoft and Xerox PARC.

Palen came to the University of Colorado Boulder as an assistant research professor in 1998, and moved to the regular-rank faculty there in 2004. She was promoted to full professor in 2015, the same year that she became founding chair of the Department of Information Science.

== Recognition ==
In 2015, Palen won the SIGCHI Social Impact Award. Palen was elected to the CHI Academy in 2016.
