= Jacob O. Wobbrock =

American computer scientist

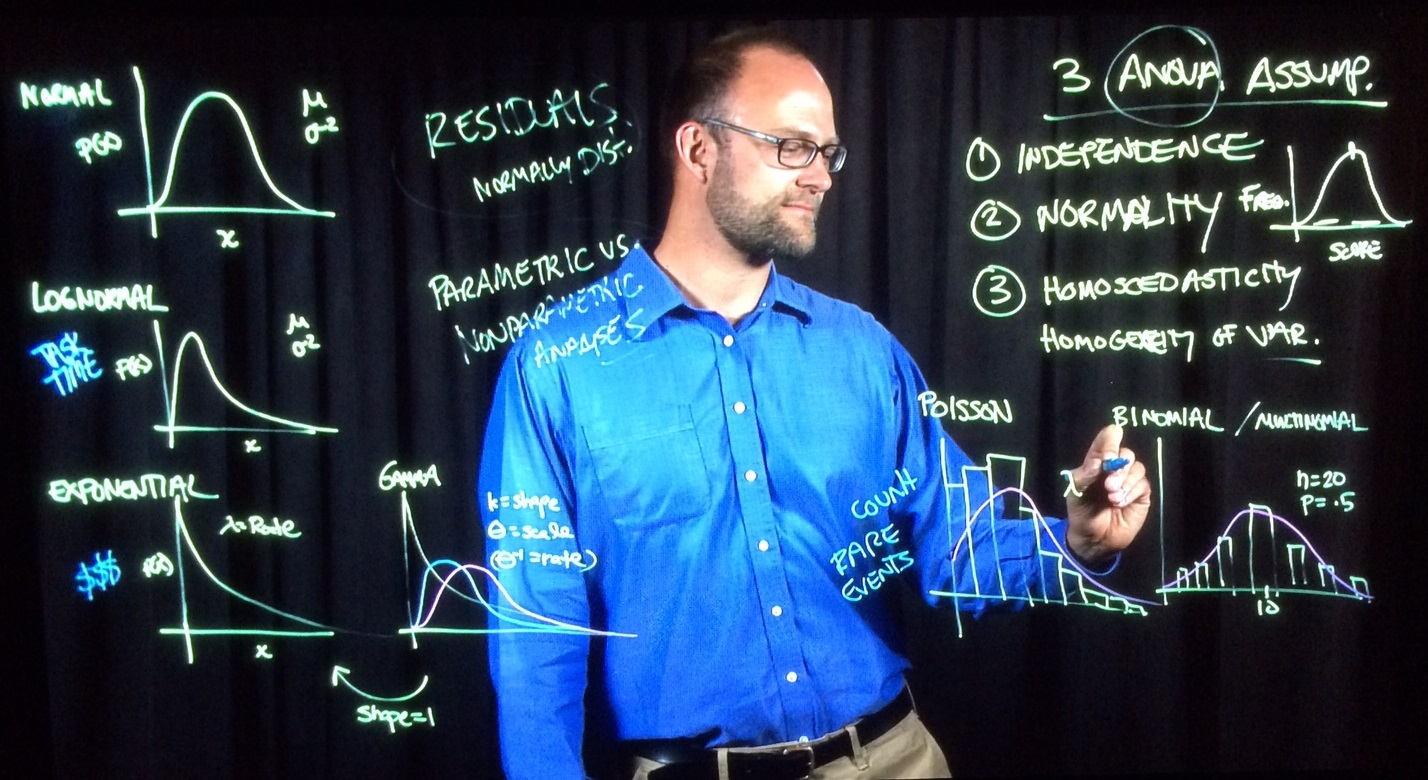
- Wobbrock in 2016
- Education: Stanford University (B.S. with Honors in Symbolic Systems, 1998; M.S. in Computer Science, 2000); Carnegie Mellon University (Ph.D. in Human–Computer Interaction, 2006)
- Known for: Ability-based design; $-family gesture recognizers; End-user elicitation methods; Slide Rule; ARTool; EdgeWrite
- Awards: ACM SIGACCESS Award for Outstanding Contributions to Computing and Accessibility (2026); ACM Fellow (2021); CHI Academy (2019); ACM SIGCHI Social Impact Award (2017); ACM SIGACCESS ASSETS Paper Impact Awards (2019, 2025); ACM ICMI 10-Year Technical Impact Award (2022); ACM UIST Lasting Impact Award (2024); NSF CAREER Award (2010)
- Scientific career
- Fields: Human–computer interaction; Mobile computing; Computer accessibility
- Workplaces: University of Washington
- Doctoral advisor: Brad A. Myers
- Other academic advisors: Terry Winograd (M.S.); Tom Wasow (B.S.)
- Website: faculty.washington.edu/wobbrock/

Jacob O. Wobbrock is an American computer scientist and professor of human–computer interaction (HCI) at the University of Washington (UW), where he is a faculty member in the Information School and, by courtesy, the Paul G. Allen School of Computer Science & Engineering. His research in HCI focuses on mobile and accessible computing, including text entry, pointing, touch and gesture input, human performance measurement and modeling, and HCI research and design methods.

At UW, Wobbrock helped build one of the world’s major HCI research communities. He co-founded the cross-campus design: use: build: (DUB) Group and the Master of Human-Computer Interaction and Design (MHCI+D) degree, directs the Accessible Computing Experiences (ACE) Lab, and is associate director and founding co-director emeritus of the Center for Research and Education on Accessible Technology and Experiences (CREATE). He is known for the ability-based design approach to accessible computing, the $-family of gesture recognizers, end-user elicitation methods for input design, the Slide Rule touch-based screen reader for blind users, and the Aligned Rank Transform tool for nonparametric statistics (ARTool). For his contributions he has received four 10-year lasting impact awards, the SIGCHI Social Impact Award, induction to the CHI Academy, election as an ACM Fellow, and the SIGACCESS Award for Outstanding Contributions to Computing and Accessibility.

== Education ==
Wobbrock received a B.S. with Honors in Symbolic Systems from Stanford University in 1998, concentrating in HCI under advisor Tom Wasow. His honors thesis on the law and policy of autonomous software agents received Stanford's Robert M. Golden Medal for Excellence in Humanities and Creative Arts.

For his graduate studies, Wobbrock earned an M.S. in Computer Science from Stanford in 2000, specializing in HCI under advisor Terry Winograd. Wobbrock completed a Ph.D. in HCI at the Human–Computer Interaction Institute in the School of Computer Science at Carnegie Mellon University in 2006 under advisor Brad A. Myers. His dissertation on the EdgeWrite text entry system received the School of Computer Science's Distinguished Dissertation Award.

Between his M.S. and Ph.D. from 1999 – 2001, Wobbrock worked at Silicon Valley startups DoDots and Google.

== Research ==
Wobbrock joined the University of Washington faculty in 2006 as an Assistant Professor in the Information School, becoming Associate Professor in 2011 and full Professor in 2017; he also holds a courtesy appointment in Computer Science & Engineering. At UW he directs the ACE Lab, co-founded the DUB Group and the MHCI+D degree, and served as founding co-director of the CREATE center.

His research seeks to understand people's performance and experiences with interactive technologies and to design, build, and evaluate new interaction techniques and systems, especially for people with disabilities. He has worked on text entry, pointing, touch and gesture; human performance measurement and modeling; HCI research and design methods; virtual reality; mobile HCI; accessible computing; and human-centered A.I., among other topics.

Wobbrock is a co-originator of ability-based design, a framework in accessible computing that proposes designing interactive systems around people's abilities rather than their disabilities, and making systems bear the burden of matching their users' abilities. His other work on gesture recognition includes the $1 recognizer, a simple template-based recognizer for rapid prototyping, and the $P recognizer for point-cloud gestures, which later received 10-year lasting impact awards from ACM UIST and ACM ICMI, respectively.

In accessible mobile interaction, Wobbrock co-designed the Slide Rule system, which defined a set of touch and gesture interactions enabling blind people to use touchscreen devices for the first time; in 2008, Slide Rule was one of the first touch-driven screen readers. The work received the 2019 ACM SIGACCESS ASSETS Paper Impact Award.

Wobbrock has also contributed to methods and tools in HCI research. His work on end-user elicitation helped formalize how designers derive input vocabularies from user-suggested gestures and commands, and he developed ARTool, software for conducting nonparametric factorial analyses on Windows and in R.

He has co-authored more than 250 publications and 19 patents, receiving 37 paper awards, including multiple best paper and honorable mention awards from the ACM CHI conference and related venues.

== Entrepreneurship ==
In 2012, Wobbrock co-founded the software company AnswerDash (originally Qazzow) with fellow UW professor Amy J. Ko and then-doctoral student Parmit Chilana. AnswerDash provided cloud-based, context-sensitive help and customer support tools for websites and web applications. Wobbrock served as the company's CEO from 2012 to 2015. Under his leadership, the company raised venture funding, launched a multi-platform SaaS product, and signed corporate customers before he returned full-time to academia. In 2020, AnswerDash was acquired by the Spokane-based company CloudEngage.

== Awards and honors ==
Wobbrock's research in HCI and accessible computing has been recognized with a number of awards, including:

- 2026 ACM SIGACCESS Award for Outstanding Contributions to Computing and Accessibility.
- 2024 ACM UIST Lasting Impact Award for the $1 recognizer.
- 2022 ACM ICMI Ten-Year Technical Impact Award for the $P recognizer.
- 2021 election as a Fellow of the Association for Computing Machinery "for contributions to human-computer interaction and accessible computing".
- 2019 ACM CHI Academy induction.
- 2019 and 2025 ACM SIGACCESS ASSETS Paper Impact Awards for long-term impact in accessible computing.
- 2018 and 2021 ranking as the #1 and in 2020 as the #2 "Most Influential Scholar in HCI" by the AMiner AI 2000 ranking system.
- 2017 ACM SIGCHI Social Impact Award for contributions to accessible computing.
- 2010 National Science Foundation CAREER Award, "Advancing Accessible Computing with Tools for Ability-Based Design".
- 2006 Distinguished Dissertation Award from the School of Computer Science, Carnegie Mellon University.
- 2005, 2008, and 2009 NISH National Scholar Awards for Workplace Innovation and Design.
- 1998 Robert M. Golden Medal for Excellence in Humanities and Creative Arts, Stanford University.
