= CSUR =

CSUR may refer to:

- ACM Computing Surveys, a peer-reviewed scientific journal
- ConScript Unicode Registry, a project to maintain a registry of scripts and the codes assigned to them
