= El Saddik =

El Saddik is a surname. Notable people with the surname include:

- Abdulmotaleb El Saddik (born 1969), Lebanese-Canadian computer engineer and scientist
- Wafaa El Saddik (born 1950), Egyptian egyptologist
