= Paul G. Allen School of Computer Science and Engineering =

School at the University of Washington

Coordinates: 47°39′11.376″N 122°18′19.116″W

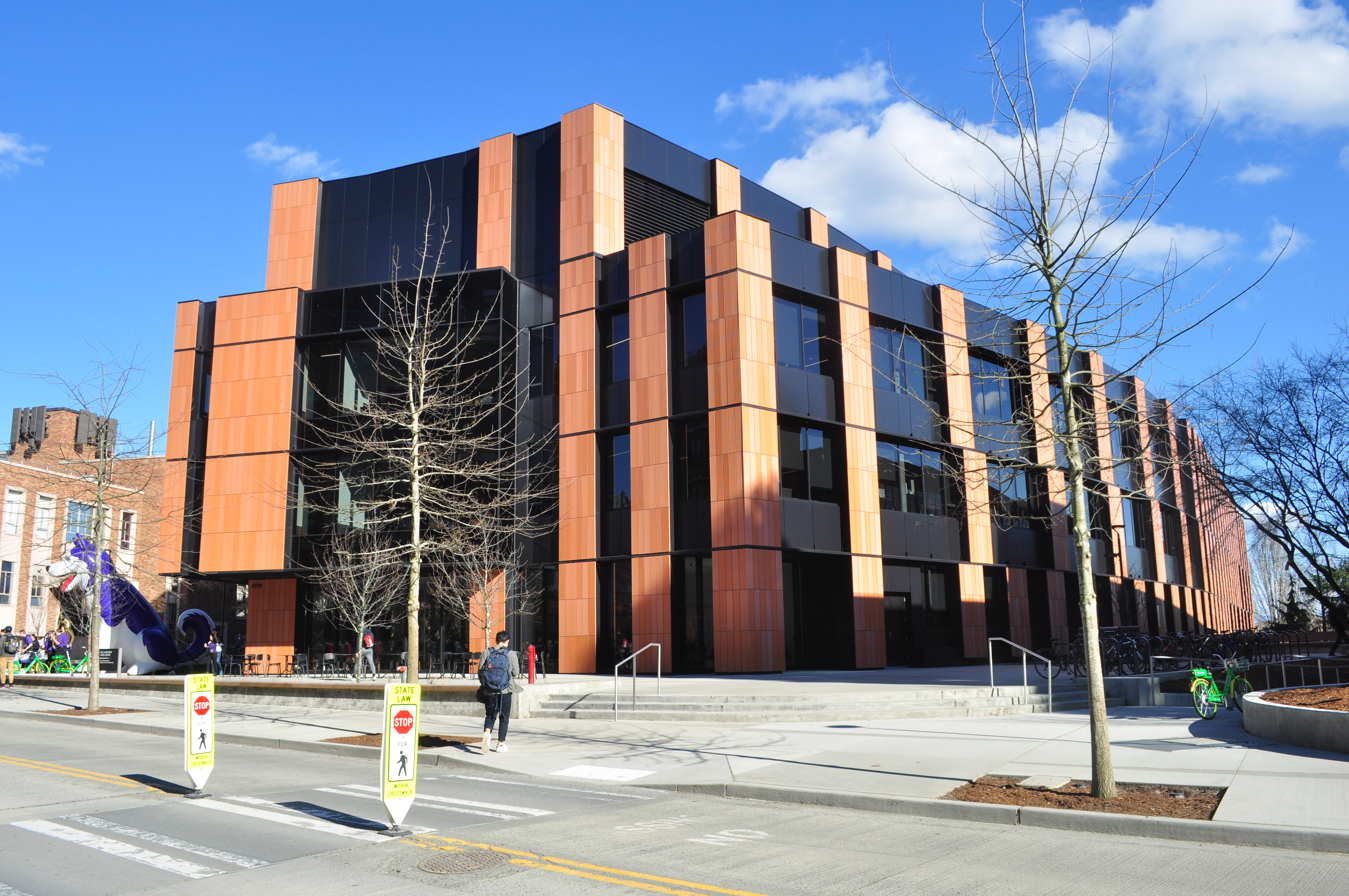
- Bill & Melinda Gates Center for Computer Science & Engineering
- Former names: Computer Science Group (1967–1974); Department of Computer Science and Engineering (1974–2017)
- Type: Public
- Established: 1967; 59 years ago
- Parent institution: University of Washington College of Engineering
- Director: Dan Grossman (interim)
- Undergraduates: 1,930
- Postgraduates: 72 (combined BS/MS) + 193 (MS)
- Doctoral students: 326
- Location: Seattle, Washington, United States
- Campus: Urban
- Website: cs.washington.edu

The Paul G. Allen School of Computer Science and Engineering (abbreviated as the Allen School) is a department-level school within the College of Engineering at the University of Washington in Seattle.

The Allen School offers undergraduate and graduate degree programs in Computer Science and Computer Engineering. Founded in 1967 as the Computer Science Group, after a number of transitions it became the Paul G. Allen School of Computer Science and Engineering in 2017 following a $50 million gift from Paul Allen and Microsoft.

The school is housed in two adjacent buildings on the UW campus: the Bill & Melinda Gates for Computer Science & Engineering, and the Paul G. Allen Center for Computer Science and Engineering.

== History ==
The Computer Science Group was established in March 1967 as a graduate program under the Graduate School. In preparation for the introduction of an undergraduate program in the 1975-76 academic year, it morphed into the Department of Computer Science, an inter-college unit reporting to the College of Arts and Sciences and the College of Engineering. In 1989, the department became a unit of the College of Engineering as the Department of Computer Science & Engineering, and a Computer Engineering degree program was added. A professional master's program, which features evening courses, debuted in 1996. A five year combined Bachelors/Masters program was added in 2008.

On March 9, 2017, the unit's 50th anniversary, the UW Board of Regents voted to elevate the unit to a school, naming it for Microsoft co-founder Paul Allen with a $50 million endowment from Allen and Microsoft.

As of 2026, the Allen School has roughly 95 faculty members across tenure-track, teaching-track, and research professors. Nearly 1,000 PhD students have graduated from the school.

=== Facilities ===
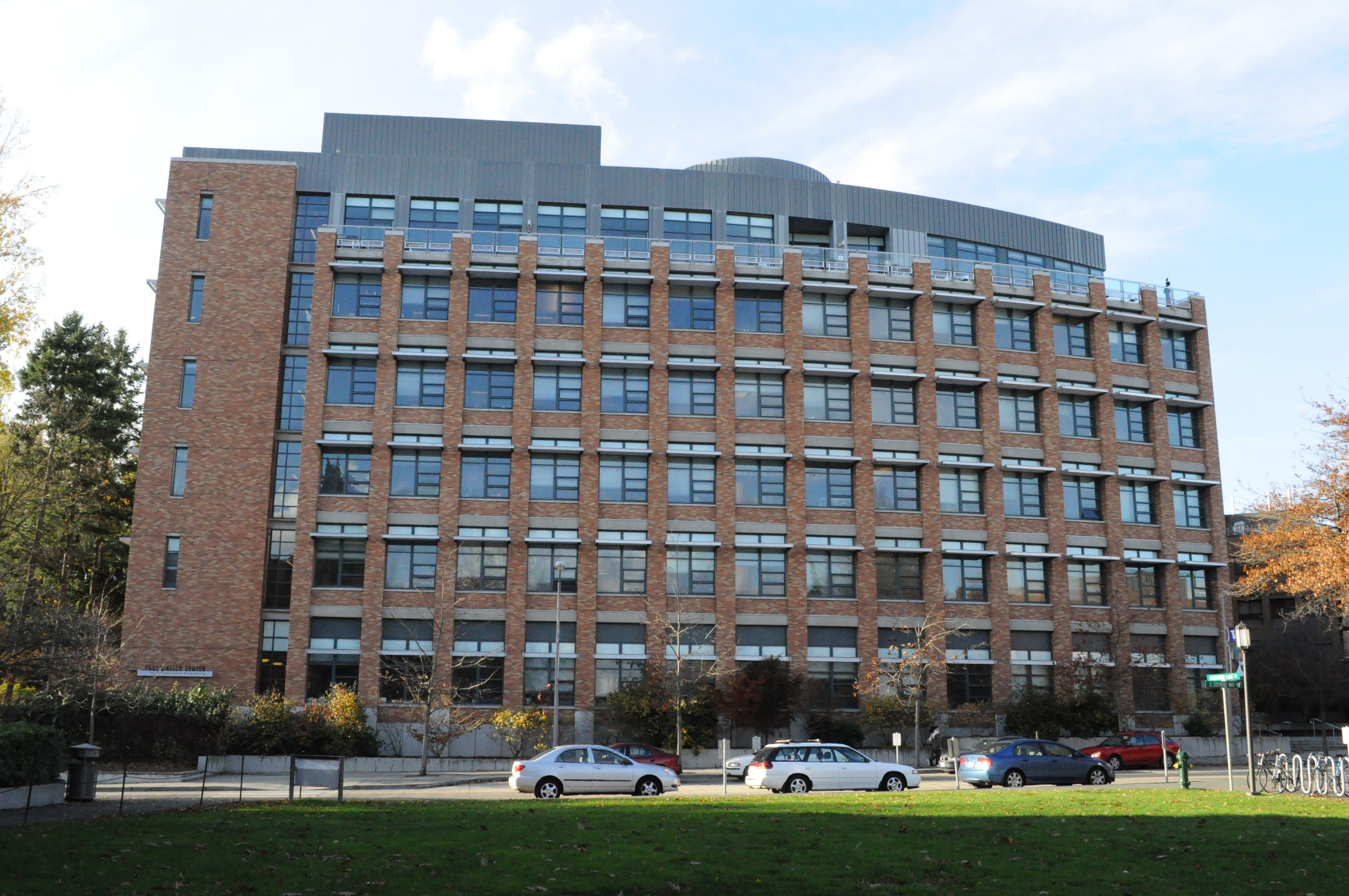
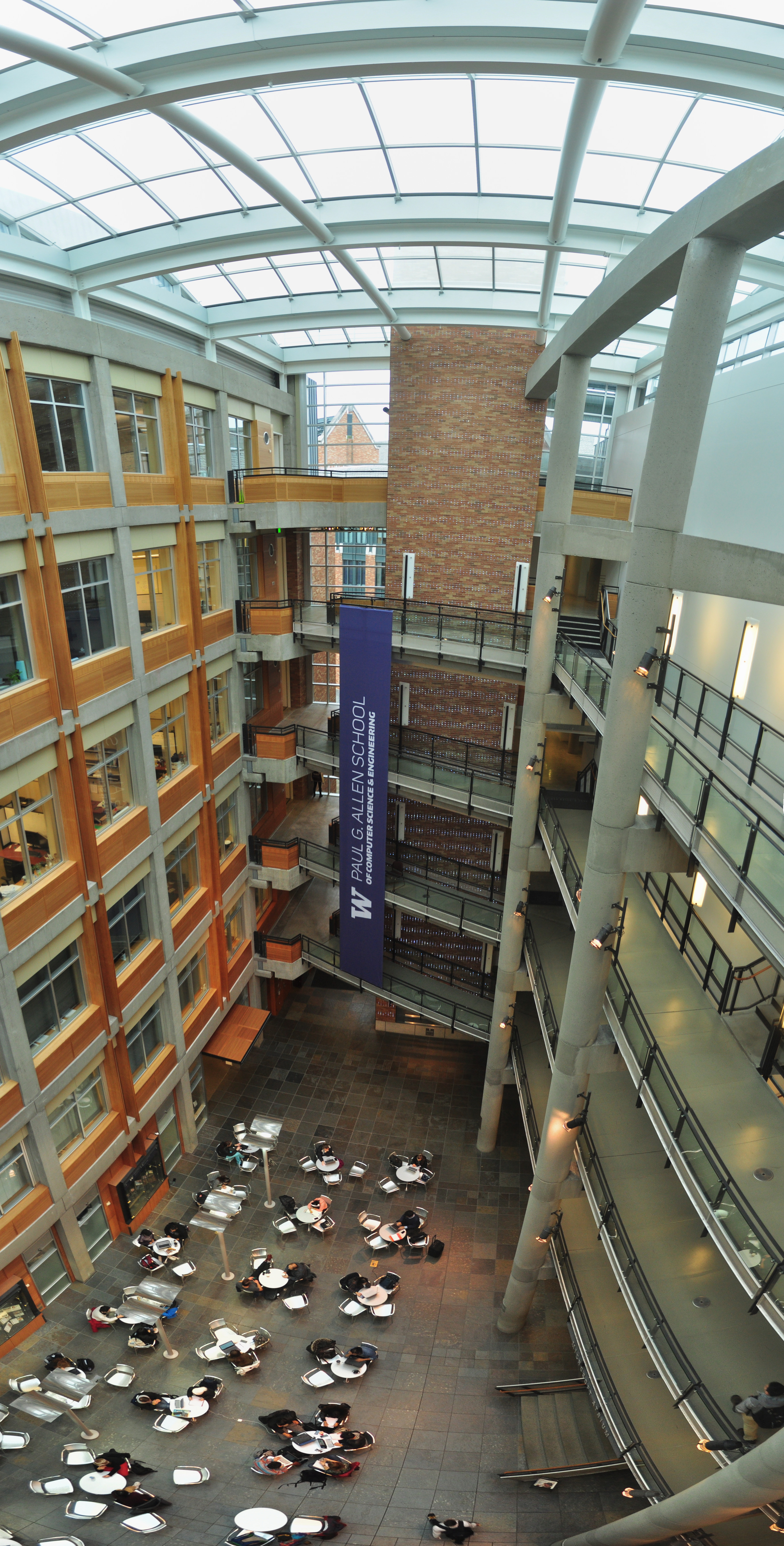
Exterior and interior of the Paul G. Allen Center for Computer Science and Engineering

The Computer Science Group was housed in Roberts Hall, constructed in 1921 to serve the university's College of Mines. In 1974 the program moved into larger quarters in Sieg Hall. The program remained there until the Paul G. Allen Center for Computer Science & Engineering was dedicated in 2003, designed by LMN Architects.

The goal of the Allen Center was to provide laboratory space to accommodate the changing nature of the field. In 2015, in response to rapidly growing student demand, a campaign was launched to build a second building, sited across the street from the Allen Center, on the site of the decommissioned UW nuclear reactor. This building, also designed by LMN Architects, contains a 250-seat auditorium, two large classrooms, undergraduate community spaces and work spaces, and office space for faculty and graduate students.

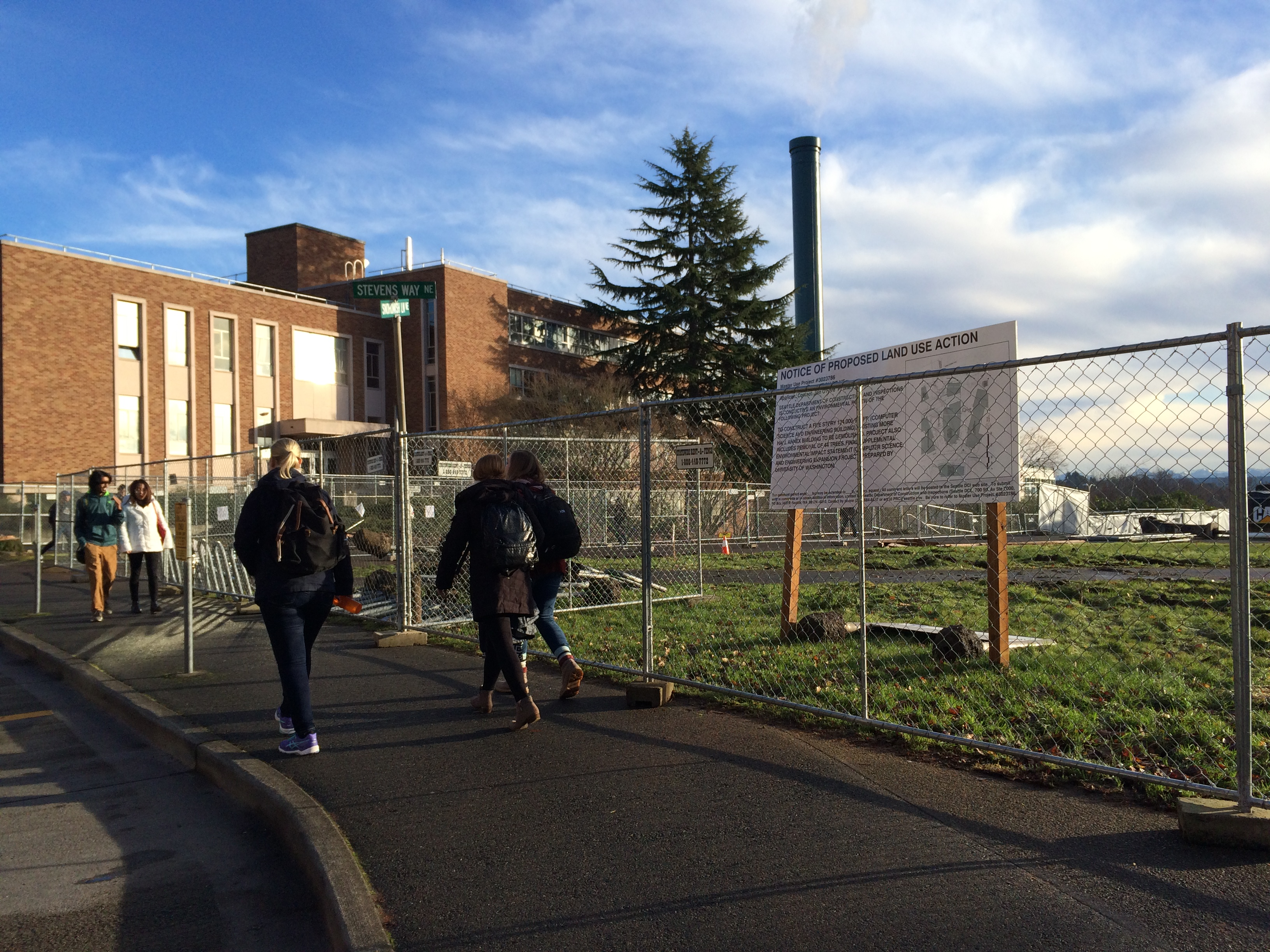
Bill & Melinda Gates Center construction site after removal of decommissioned nuclear reactor at More Hall Annex

Both the Allen Center and the Gates Center were largely privately funded, with more than 200 donors each, led by Paul Allen, Microsoft, the Bill & Melinda Gates Foundation, Amazon, Google, Zillow, and Charles and Lisa Simonyi. The Gates Center was named for Bill and Melinda out of respect and gratitude by a group including Microsoft and 13 couples who called themselves "friends of Bill & Melinda."

On February 28, 2019, the Bill & Melinda Gates Center for Computer Science & Engineering officially opened, with classes starting inside the following quarter. The site formerly housed More Hall Annex, which contained a nuclear research reactor.

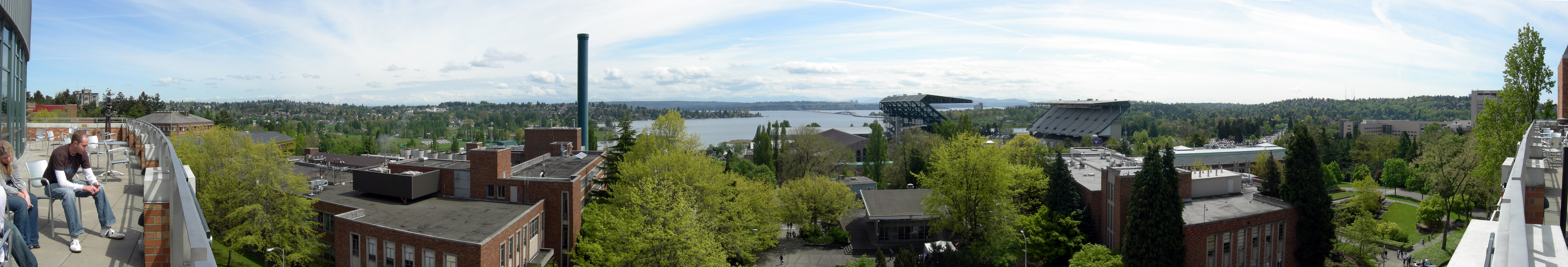
View from rooftop of CSE in 2008. Old nuclear reactor building still visible across the street where CSE2 is now

== Academics ==
The school offers two bachelors of science degree programs: computer science and computer engineering. 90% of undergraduates are enrolled in the computer science major. The size of the undergraduate program has risen rapidly, more than tripling from 558 students in 2012 to 1,996 in 2021.

=== Admissions ===
Admission to the undergraduate majors is highly competitive. Since 2017, computer science has been the most desired major for confirmed incoming freshman at UW. Applicants to both majors are considered as one pool, so neither is more competitive. There are four pathways to admission into either major:

- Direct to major for freshman applicants
- Current UW student admission
- Washington State Academic Redshirt (STARS) Program
- Transfer admission

For most of the school's history, current UW student admits made up the majority of students. Starting in fall 2019, the school shifted its admission strategy from prioritizing current UW student admission to admitting the majority of its undergraduate majors directly admission for freshman applicants. Of those current UW students who are admitted, the Allen School gives preference to "interest changers" - people who only discover an interest in computing after starting at UW. In the 2019-20 admissions cycle, about 200 students were admitted directly, 100 students were admitted from current UW students, and 60-70 students were admitted as transfer students. As of 2023, most undergraduates are direct admits, and about 25-30% of majors are current UW student admits. In 2021 and 2022, only 9% and 8% of direct admits were accepted. The direct admission pathway is designed primarily for Washington state residents, and approximately one quarter of applications from in-state are accepted.

The STARS program is a program in College of Engineering designed to support students from low-income, first-generation, and other underserved backgrounds. The term "redshirting" is derived from athletes in US college sports who delay their entrance into games by spending a year training. Similarly, students in the STARS program spend a year in STEM courses with a cohort of STARS students before entering their undergraduate STEM major. Transfer admission is for students transferring to UW from another college. Applicants must submit a supplemental application to the Allen School in addition to the UW transfer process. Preference is given to students transferring from a Washington state community college.

=== Demographics ===
In 2022, the Allen School had a total of 1,930 undergraduates majors, with an incoming class of 526 students. The incoming class was made up of 391 direct admits, 44 transfer students, and 91 students from other pathways. The gender breakdown for undergraduate students was 34% female and 66% male. The racial demographics of undergraduate majors were 78% white and Asian, 10% Black, Hispanic, Latina/x/o, American Indian, and Hawaiian/Pacific Islander, while the 12% of students who are international were not counted. Washington state residents made up 82% of undergraduates and the remaining 6% of domestic students were from out of state. 20% of undergraduates were eligible for the federal Pell grant.

Although the Allen School's percentage of women in undergraduate programs (34%) outpaces some other computer science schools in America, it falls behind other computing programs at UW, including Human Centered Design & Engineering (66% female) and the Information School (41% female)

== Notable people ==
=== Faculty ===
- Leilani Battle
- Luis Ceze
- Carl Ebeling (formerly)
- Ali Farhadi
- Tadayoshi Kohno
- William Stafford Noble
- Stuart Reges (teaching-track)
- Ryen W. White (affiliate)
- Jacob O. Wobbrock

=== Alumni ===
- Jeff Dean (PhD 1996): Early employee at Google
- Mitchell Hashimoto (BS 2011) and Armon Dadgar (BS 2011): Founders of HashiCorp
- Sergey Karayev (BS 2009): Head of STEM AI at Gradescope
- Brad Fitzpatrick (BS 2002): Creator of LiveJournal and Memcached
- Paul Mikesell (1996): Co-founder of Isilon Systems
- Tessa Lau (PhD 2001): Founder & CEO of Dusty Robotics

== See also ==
- Reges v. Cauce
