= ACM Computing Reviews =

- Discipline: Computer science
- Language: English
- Edited by: Carol Hutchins

Publication details
- History: online availability 1985-present
- Publisher: ACM (United States)
- Frequency: Monthly
- Open access: No

Standard abbreviations
- ISO 4: ACM Comput. Rev.

Indexing
- ISSN: 0010-4884 (print); 1530-6585 (web)

Links
- Journal homepage

ACM Computing Reviews (CR) is a scientific journal that reviews literature in the field of computer science. It is published by the Association for Computing Machinery and the editor-in-chief is Carol Hutchins (New York University).

== See also ==
- ACM Guide to Computing Literature
- ACM Computing Surveys
- Algorithms
