= Brad A. Myers =

American computer scientist

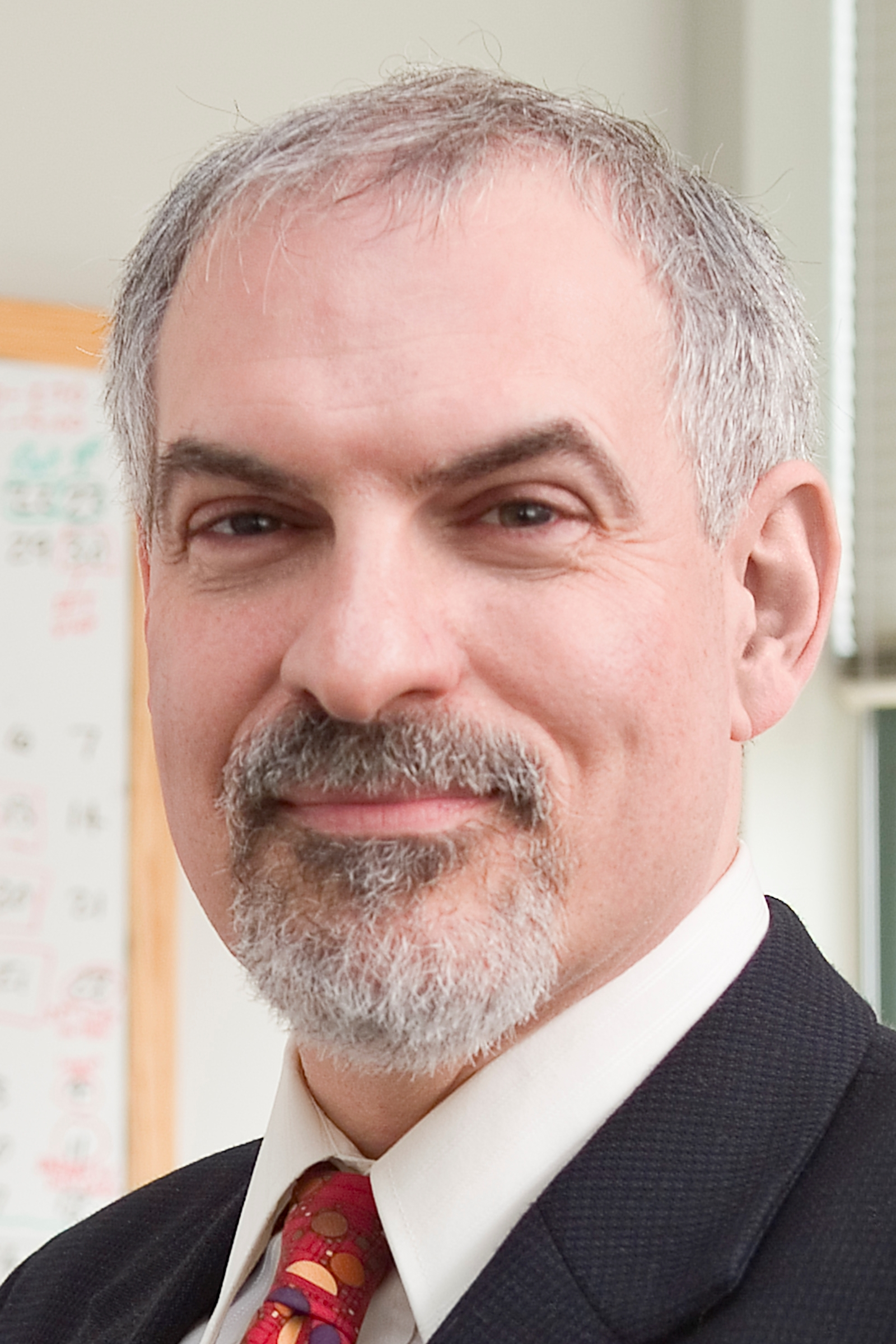
- Education: Massachusetts Institute of Technology (BS, MS); University of Toronto (PhD)
- Awards: ACM SIGCHI Lifetime Achievement, Charles Babbage Institute Human-Computer Interaction History Prize, ACM Fellow, IEEE Fellow, CHI Academy
- Scientific career
- Fields: Human–computer interaction; Mobile computing; Software engineering
- Workplaces: Carnegie Mellon University, Three Rivers Computer Corporation

Brad Allan Myers is a professor in the Human-Computer Interaction Institute at Carnegie Mellon University and has served as its director since 2023. His research has broadly influenced human–computer interaction, particularly the ways interactive systems are designed, implemented, and programmed. His work connects foundational user-interface technologies with human-centered approaches to making computing systems easier to create and use.

== Education ==
Brad Myers went to Isidore Newman School from kindergarten through high school. Myers received his BS degree in Computer Science and MS degree in Computer Science and Engineering at MIT in 1980, while simultaneously interning at Xerox PARC for his Master's thesis. He earned his PhD in computer science at the University of Toronto in 1987, under Bill Buxton and Ronald Baecker.

== Work ==
Myers's work is focused on researching the technical side of user interfaces, and creating software systems, most of which have gem and rock themed acronyms.

=== Early Work ===
While a student at MIT in the 1970s, he worked at many distinguished institutes including Xerox PARC and the MIT Architecture Machine Group (now the Media Lab). Myers's MIT Master's thesis, done at MIT and PARC, was one of the earliest data visualization systems.

=== Interaction Techniques ===
Myers is also known for inventing and researching Interaction techniques. His first job was at Three Rivers Computer Corporation, where he created one of the first commercial window managers in 1983, called SAPPHIRE, with a number of features that later became widespread. Later, while a PhD student at the University of Toronto, he did a study of progress bars, that helped popularize them for long-running activities. He and his former PhD student Jacob O. Wobbrock developed the EdgeWrite text entry technique. He also developed new forms of Selective Undo for use in graphics and textual editing.

He has also chronicled the history and design of interaction techniques. His two-hour 1990 video “All the Widgets” captured the look and feel of interaction techniques to that point in time. His 800-page 2024 book, Pick, Click, Flick! The Story of Interaction Techniques, documents the full history and design considerations for 15 classes of interaction techniques.

=== User Interface Software ===
Brad Myers's University of Toronto dissertation described Peridot, a programming by demonstration system that specified the look and behaviors of widgets without conventional programming. At CMU, he developed the Garnet and Amulet software frameworks, which innovated new ways to do object-oriented programming, command objects, constraints, input handling, animation support, and interactive builder tools.

Another focus of Myers's work is the Natural Programming project. It focuses on user-centered programming languages and making programming easier and more correct by making it more natural. This includes work with PhD student Amy J. Ko on the “WhyLine” tool to help users debug their code. He also worked with PhD student Mary Beth Kery to explain how data science programming is exploratory programming, along with tools to help with versioning and backtracking.

=== Handheld Computers ===
Myers has had a number of research projects on handheld mobile devices, such as the Pebbles project, exploring the different uses of these devices and how they communicate with other systems. He was one of the first researchers to use the PalmPilot and Windows CE devices to explore how handhelds could be used with other devices at the same time, such as being remote controls or a remote cursor. He also explored how handhelds could be part of the Command Post of the Future from 1998-2002.

=== Students ===
Brad Myers is also known for his extensive academic family tree, with 21 PhD advisees, many of whom have also become faculty, including James Landay, Jacob O. Wobbrock, and Amy J. Ko. In all, this family tree is 7 levels deep (advisee of advisee of advisee, etc.) and contains more than 469 PhD advisees. He has also been on the thesis committees of many other PhDs students at CMU and universities throughout the world.

== Awards ==
In 2017, Brad Myers received the Association for Computing Machinery's SIGCHI Lifetime Achievement Award in Research, for outstanding fundamental and influential research contributions to the study of human-computer interaction. He was elected to the CHI Academy in 2004 as one of the "principal leaders of the field" of HCI and is an IEEE Fellow and an ACM Fellow. He is listed as one of the "Pioneers of HCI". His book, Pick, Click, Flick! The Story of Interaction Techniques, won a 2025 Charles Babbage Institute Human-Computer Interaction History Prize.

Myers is the winner of 19 best paper type awards and 6 Most Influential Paper awards and is the author or editor of over 600 publications. He is the 33rd most cited author in "human-computer interaction", according to Google Scholar. He was the most published author at the annual ACM CHI conference on Human Factors in Computing Systems between 2005 and 2015, and as of 2026 ranks 7th, and he is one of a select few who has attended every CHI conference. You can see documentation online of his extensive collection of CHI ribbons.

== Editorial Boards of Journals ==
=== Current ===
Journal of Computer Languages (COLA)

KSI Research Inc.'s Journal of Visual Languages and Computing

=== Formerly ===
Elsevier's Journal of Visual Languages and Computing

Interacting with Computers

Human-Computer Interaction Journal

Journal of Visual Languages and Sentient Systems

ACM Transactions on Computer-Human Interaction

ACM interactions magazine
