= TOCS =

TOCS may refer to:

- They're Only Chasing Safety, a post-hardcore album by Underoath
- ACM Transactions on Computer Systems, a scientific journal
- Theory of Computing Systems, a scientific journal
