= Harry Bruce (academic) =

Harry Bruce is an Australian-born professor, as well as the former Dean of the Information School at the University of Washington. His scholarly research focuses on how people locate, manage, and utilize information in digital settings, with extensive writing on information behavior and personal information management in the digital age. In 2022 he was the recipient of the Award of Merit from the Association for Information Science and Technology after being nominated by Michael Eisenberg, the previous dean of the iSchool prior to Bruce's assumption of the role.

== Biography ==
Bruce is from Sydney, Australia. He received a Bachelor of Arts in English literature from Macquarie University in 1982, a Master of Library Science from the Kuring-gai College of Advanced Education in 1988, and a PhD in library science from the University of New South Wales in 1996.

== Career ==
Following the completion of his PhD, Bruce worked in academic and library positions in Australia for several years before joining the University of Washington iSchool in 1998. He took on several leadership positions there, including Associate Dean for Research and Director of the Center for Collaboration and Creativity. In 2010, he became the dean of the iSchool, replacing Michael Eisenberg in the role.

During his time as dean, Bruce guided the iSchool through a period of significant growth, with the iSchool expanding its faculty, launching several new programs in information management and data science. Under his deanship, in 2017 the iSchool was ranked #2 overall in the United States by the U.S. News & World Report. Following his deanship, he has continued to work within the iSchool as a faculty member.

== Research and publications ==
Harry Bruce's research focuses primarily on how people seek and use information in digital environments. His work explores the relationships between personal information practices, digital learning, information literacy, and online privacy. He has given keynote addresses at symposiums and conferences in Taipei, Hong Kong, Wuhan, Riyadh, and Sydney, in addition to over two-dozen unpublished presentations at numerous events across the United States, Europe, and Asia. He has authored, co-authored, or edited several books on information behavior and information science, and has published over 30 refereed journal articles and conference papers.

=== Areas of emphasis ===
- Human information behavior
- Information Seeking and Use
- Personal Information Practices
- Networked Information Environments
- Information Literacy
- Digital Learning

=== Selected publications ===
- The User's View of the Internet (ISBN 978-0-8108-4366-0)
- Emerging Frameworks and Methods: Proceedings of the Fourth International Conference on Conceptions of Library and Information Science (CoLIS 4) (ISBN 978-1-59158-016-4)
- Information Behavior that Keeps Found Things Found (January 2004 Information Research an international electronic journal 10(1))

== Awards and honors ==
- Award of Merit (Association for Information Science and Technology)
