= James Landay =

American computer scientist

James Landay is professor of computer science at Stanford University, He specializes in human–computer interaction. He was formerly professor of information science at Cornell Tech in New York City and before that professor of computer science and engineering at the University of Washington. For three years he was the Director of Intel Labs Seattle (previously called Intel Research Seattle). Before that he was a Professor of EECS at UC Berkeley. He received his BS in EECS from UC Berkeley, and his MS and PhD in computer science from Carnegie Mellon University where he studied with Brad Myers.
