= ACM Guide to Computing Literature =

Database that categorizes and abstracts most computing literature

ACM Guide to Computing Literature is a database, published by the Association for Computing Machinery (ACM), that categorizes and abstracts most computing literature. It contains citations to all ACM publications, as well as literature from other publishers.

The Guide was also published in print from 1977 until 1997. All of the citations included in the printed Guide from 1987 through 1997 are included in the online database; citations from print issues of the Guide published prior to 1987 are not necessarily found in the online version.

The Guide is not to be confused with the ACM Digital Library. The Digital Library provides complete texts of journals, magazines and conferences sponsored or published by ACM.

== See also ==
- Association for Computing Machinery
- ACM Digital Library
- ACM Computing Reviews
