= Reges v. Cauce =

Federal lawsuit

- Court: United States Court of Appeals for the Ninth Circuit
- Full case name: Stuart Reges v. Ana Mari Cauce et al.
- Started: June 4, 2024
- Docket nos.: W.D. Wash. No. 2:22-cv-00964 Ninth Circuit No. 24-3518

Case history
- Appealed from: W.D. Wash.

Reges v. Cauce, et al. is a federal lawsuit brought by Stuart Reges, a teaching professor at the University of Washington's Paul G. Allen School of Computer Science & Engineering, against the university and its president Ana Mari Cauce. The case concerned a university recommendation to include a land acknowledgement statement in course syllabi.

== Background ==
Stuart Reges, is a teaching professor at the Paul G. Allen School of Computer Science at the University of Washington, a non-tenured position previously titled "Principal Lecturer." He started lecturing in 2004 and has exclusively taught the introductory programming series. He co-authored an introductory Java programming textbook Building Java Programs.

In 2019, the Paul G. Allen School of Computer Science recommended that faculty include a one-sentence land acknowledgement statement in course syllabi to recognize the Coast Salish peoples of the Pacific Northwest. The university's official land acknowledgement (adopted in 2015) was offered as a template. Reges disagreed with the university's recommendation to include what he viewed as a politically motivated statement in his course syllabus and disagreed with the premise of the land acknowledgement, citing the campus is on land that had been densely forested.

In 2022, Reges included a satirical parody of a land acknowledgement statement on his course syllabus stating the Coast Salish people could claim ownership of "almost none" of the land the university occupies. The statement was criticized by students and widely shared on social media. In response, school administrators directed IT staff to remove the syllabus from the course website and opened a second section of the course, taught by another professor, where about 30% of students chose to transfer.

The university began a lengthy disciplinary investigation into Reges, during which time a merit pay increase was withheld. Reges said "he had not previously been informed that he was approved for a merit increase or that it had been withheld during the disciplinary investigation." The investigation, which lasted 10 months, found that Reges had "likely violated" university policy EO-31, a nondiscrimination policy with "the goal of promoting an environment that is free of discrimination, harassment, and retaliation." The policy allowed the discipline of "any conduct that is deemed unacceptable or inappropriate, regardless of whether the conduct rises to the level of unlawful discrimination, harassment, or retaliation."

Administrators declined to sanction Reges, but warned that future inclusions of the parody statement in course syllabi would result in disciplinary action.

== District court ==
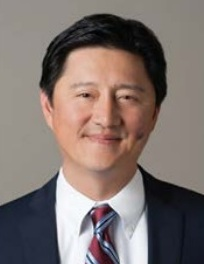
Judge John H. Chun ruled against Reges in federal district court.

Reges filed a lawsuit for first amendment retaliation and viewpoint discrimination in the United States District Court for the Western District of Washington on July 13, 2022, claiming that the university had unlawfully retaliated against him for engaging in protected speech. The lawsuit also challenged the constitutionality of EO-31, claiming it was overly broad and vague. He was represented by the Foundation for Individual Rights and Expression (FIRE).

Judge John H. Chun presided over the case. He was appointed by Joe Biden in 2022, and prior to that was appointed by Jay Inslee, both of whom are Democrats.

In May 2024, Judge Chun dismissed the plaintiff's claims.

== Appellate court ==
Appellate court panel
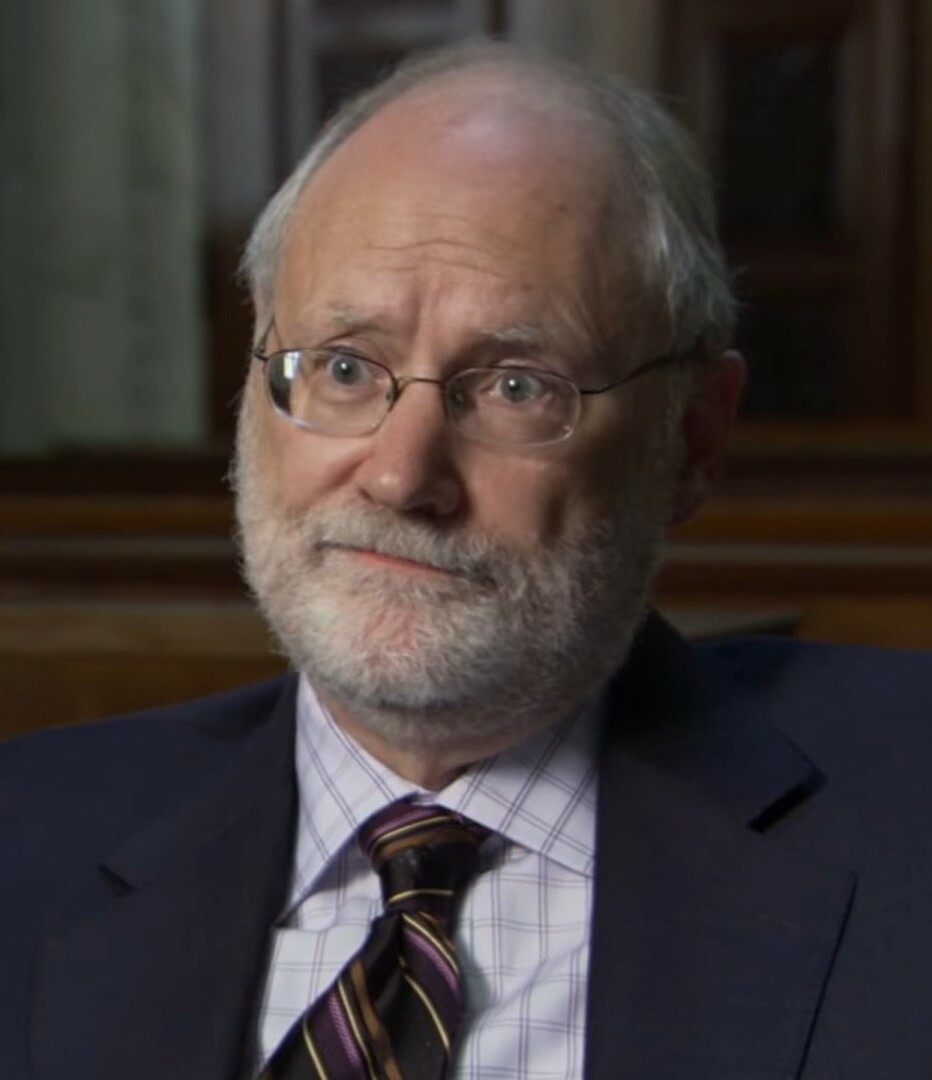
Judge Sidney Thomas

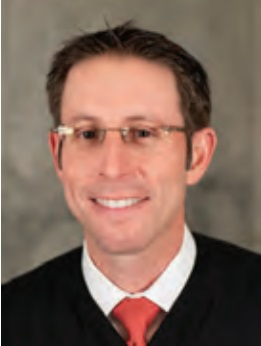
Judge Daniel Bress

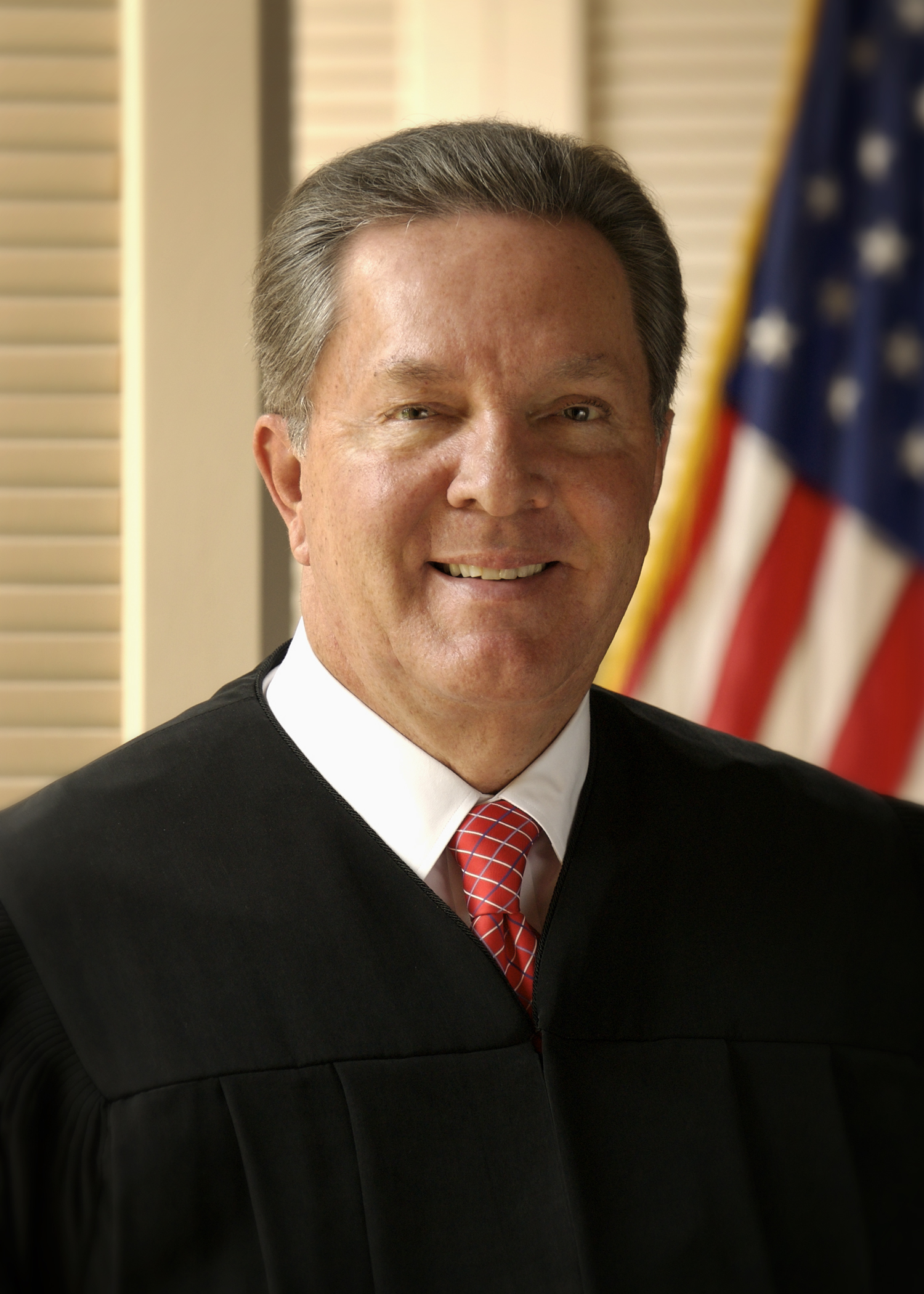
Judge Milan Smith, Jr.

Reges filed an appeal to the Ninth Circuit on June 4, 2024. Amicus briefs were submitted in support of Reges by PEN America, Manhattan Institute, Pacific Legal Foundation, Students for Liberty, and James G. Martin Center for Academic Renewal. An amicus curiae was submitted in support of Cauce, et al. by Washington State University. Appellants asked the court for de novo review, substituting their judgment on how statutes apply in place of the lower court's prior ruling. De novo review is not always required on appeal in the United States, but is common following a precedent set by Bose Corp. v. Consumers Union of United States, Inc. (1984).

The judges assigned to the case were Sidney R. Thomas, Milan Smith, Jr., and Daniel Bress. Reges' counsel presented oral arguments before the panel in a hearing on May 15, 2025. Appellants sought to revoke the letter of discipline against Professor Reges and an injunction preventing the university from enforcing Executive Order 31. In terms of financial compensation, they sought interest on the deferred merit pay increase and emotional distress damages.

Two of the three appeals court judges appeared unconvinced by the university's argument. Judge Milan Smith remarked that he was "struck by how sensitive the students or others were, some people would call it 'woke', they can call it whatever they want, but the reality is they were upset. What standard do we use... let's say we had a room full of people who considered it a triggering moment if the professor blew his nose or if the professor wore a MAGA hat. Can that possibly count in a Pickering analysis?"

On December 19, 2025, the Ninth Circuit reversed the district court's ruling and remanded the case back to the district court.

On September 4, 2026, it was reported that the University of Washington settled with Reges for $600,000. A spokesperson said the university "acted appropriately, and this settlement is in no way an admission of any wrongdoing”, noting that Reges continued to serve in his faculty role as an instructor throughout the duration of his lawsuit.
