= David M. Levy =

American computer scientist

David Levy is an American computer scientist and professor at University of Washington Information School. He is known for his research, writing, and teaching on the prevention of information overload.

== Biography ==
Levy attended Dartmouth College, receiving a BA in pure mathematics in 1971. He was the valedictorian of Dartmouth's Class of 1971. He later received a PhD in computer science from Stanford University in 1979. He also earned a degree at Roehampton Institute, London, in calligraphy and bookbinding in 1982. He was a member of the Xerox Palo Alto Research Center (PARC) for 15 years (until December, 1999). At PARC, he researched the nature of documents and the tools and practices through which they are created and used. His current research focuses on information and the quality of life. His book, Scrolling Forward: Making Sense of Documents in the Digital Age, was published by Arcade Publishing in 2001. In 2016, he released a book titled Mindful Tech: How to Bring Balance to Our Digital Lives, published by Yale University Press, surrounding how individuals and societies might "live healthy, reflective, and productive lives" with technology

== Publications ==
- Levy, David M. (2016). Mindful Tech: How to Bring Balance to Our Digital Lives. Yale University Press. ISBN 0300208316.
- Levy, D. M. (1994). Fixed or fluid? Document stability and new media. European Conference on Hypertext Technology 1994 Proceedings. New York: Association for Computing Machinery. pp. 24–31.
- Levy, David M. (2008). Information Overload. In Kenneth E. Himma and Herman T. Tavani (Ed.), The Handbook of Information and Computer Ethics (pp. 497–516). Hoboken, New Jersey: John Wiley & Sons. ISBN 0470281804.
- Levy, David M. (2005). Robots Unlimited: Life in a Virtual Age. ISBN 1568812396.
