= Department of Bioengineering (University of Washington) =

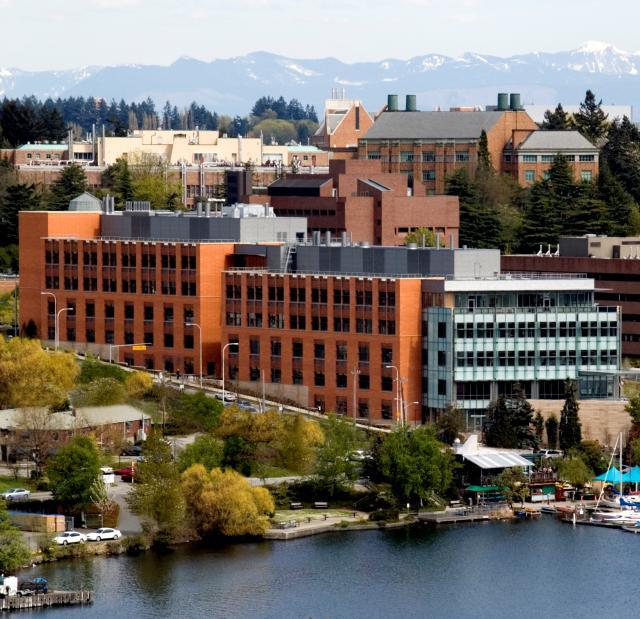
- William H. Foege Building
- Motto: Inventing the Future of Medicine
- Type: Public
- Established: 1984
- Parent institution: University of Washington College of Engineering
- Location: Seattle, Washington, USA
- Campus: Urban
- Website: bioe.uw.edu
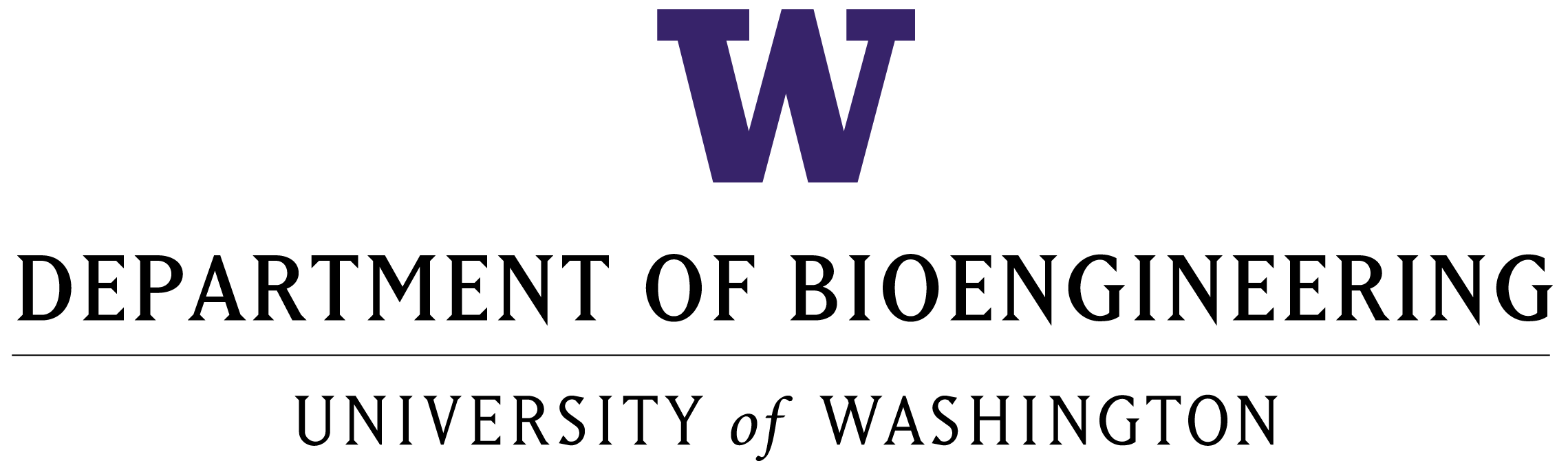

The Department of Bioengineering is an academic department within the College of Engineering at the University of Washington, located in Seattle, Washington.

== Overview ==
The Department of Bioengineering offers undergraduate and graduate degrees in bioengineering, a field at the interface between medicine and engineering. As of 2022, the department includes 51 active core faculty, including six members of the National Academy of Engineering. The faculty conduct a mix of basic and applied multi-disciplinary research; particularly in the following six areas: regenerative medicine & biomaterials, molecular & cellular engineering; instrumentation, imaging & image-guided therapy; systems, synthetic and quantitative biology; neural engineering and technology for expanding access to health care. In 2022, UW Bioengineering was awarded US$30,219,529 million in research funding, primarily from federal sources such as the National Institutes of Health, United States Department of Defense and National Science Foundation.

In addition to the core faculty, which is 38% female, the department comprises 49 adjunct faculty, 51 affiliate faculty, 53 postdoctoral fellows, 195 graduate students and 221 undergraduate students.

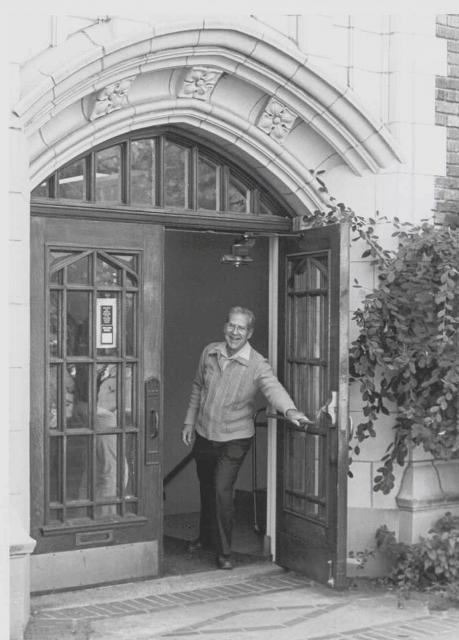
Bob Rushmer at Harris Hydraulics, the old home of UW Bioengineering

== History ==
The UW Center for Bioengineering was founded in 1967 by Robert Rushmer as a joint research enterprise of the UW College of Engineering and the UW School of Medicine to study the cardiovascular system. A main focus was groundbreaking work on the development of quieter, portable Doppler ultrasound instruments for monitoring the cardiovascular system and fetal heart rate, building on work that Rushmer had begun at the UW in 1958. These developments formed the basis for a strong local ultrasound industry that persist to this day.

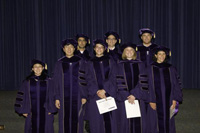
UW Bioengineering graduates

With the Center for Bioengineering, Dr. Rushmer aimed to develop a joint research enterprise of the UW College of Engineering and UW School of Medicine to study the cardiovascular system. As its research foci expanded, the center received the ability to grant PhD degrees in 1984. Undergraduate courses were added in 1985. The Center became the Department of Bioengineering in 1997. Its undergraduate program was approved in 2000, which was accredited by the Accreditation Board for Engineering and Technology (ABET) in 2008 (retroactive to 2006). In 2006, the department moved into the new William H. Foege Building, a 265,000 sq. ft. research facility on campus adjacent to Seattle's Portage Bay that includes offices, laboratories, and support facilities.
