= University of Washington College of Engineering =

Engineering school of the University of Washington in Seattle, U.S.

Coordinates: 47°39′15″N 122°18′16″W

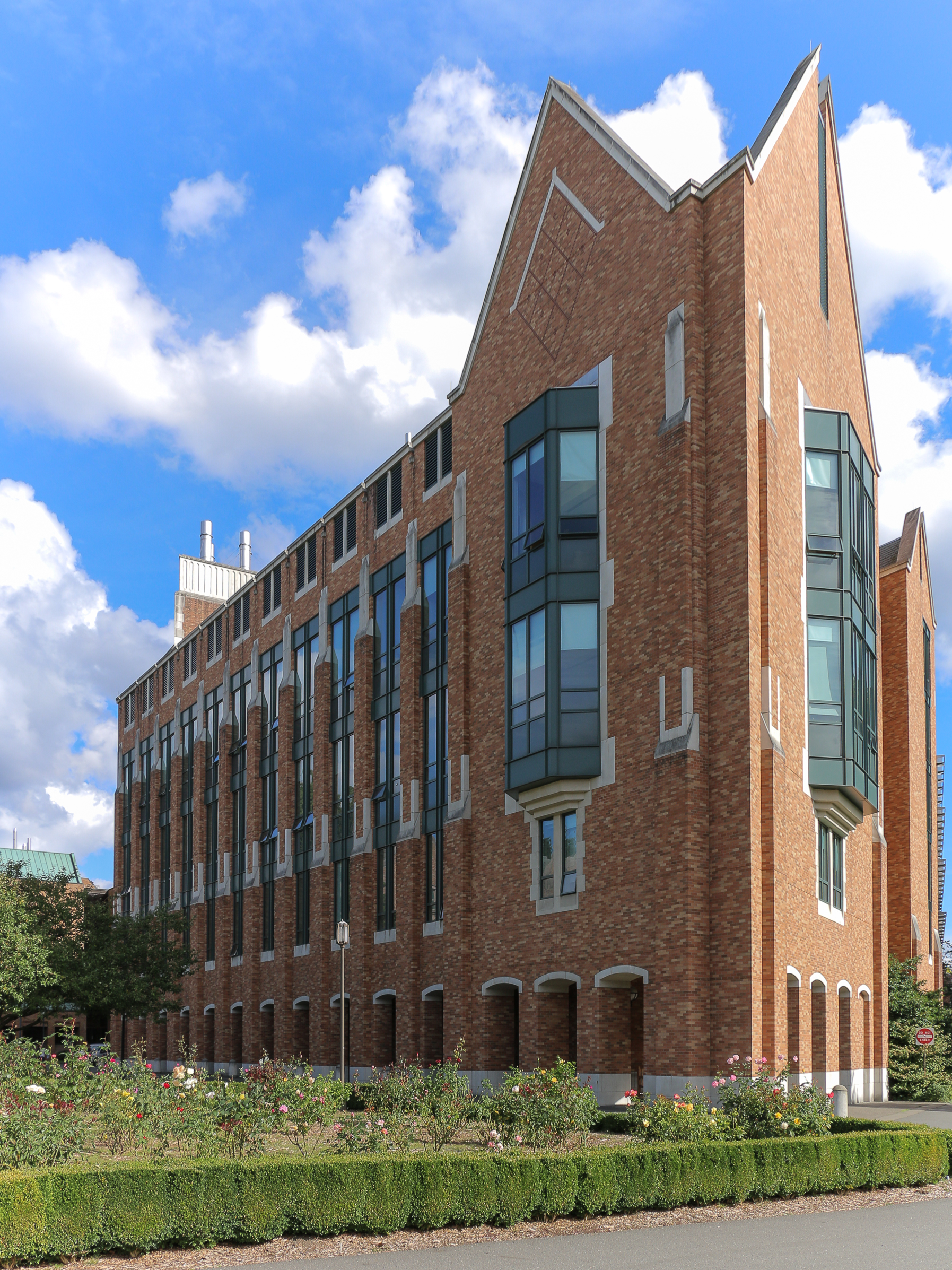
- Electrical & Computer Engineering Building
- Type: Public engineering school
- Established: 1901
- Parent institution: University of Washington
- Dean: Nancy Allbritton
- Academic staff: 269
- Students: 8,125
- Undergraduates: 5,388
- Postgraduates: 2,746
- Location: Seattle, Washington, U.S.
- Website: engr.washington.edu

The University of Washington College of Engineering is the engineering school of the University of Washington. It has ten academic departments, including the Paul G. Allen School of Computer Science and Engineering.

== Departments ==
The College of Engineering includes the following academic departments:

- William E. Boeing Department of Aeronautics and Astronautics
- Department of Bioengineering
- Department of Chemical Engineering
- Department of Civil and Environmental Engineering
- Paul G. Allen School of Computer Science and Engineering
- Department of Electrical and Computer Engineering
- Department of Human Centered Design and Engineering
- Department of Industrial and Systems Engineering
- Department of Materials Science and Engineering
- Department of Mechanical Engineering

== History ==
Faculty of UW Engineering have included 27 members of the National Academy of Engineering, 32 Sloan Foundation Research Award recipients, and two MacArthur Foundation Fellows.

In autumn 2017, the college began a "Direct to College" admission process by which prospective freshman can apply directly to the college to be assured a place in an engineering major. Accepted students must still meet minimum progress requirements to enter a major. The process was created in response to the growing competition at the college, where fewer than half of undergraduates who apply to major in engineering are accepted. This admissions system is not used for the Paul G. Allen school.
