= Anind Dey =

Canadian academic (born 1970)

Anind K. Dey
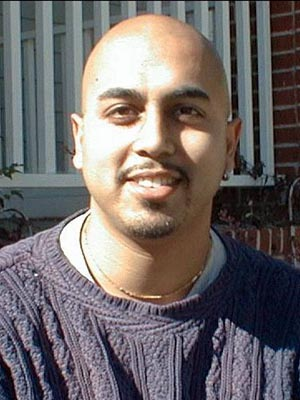
- Born: 1970 (age 55–56); Canada
- Education: Georgia Institute of Technology, Simon Fraser University
- Known for: Context-aware computing, ubiquitous computing, human–computer interaction
- Awards: Impact Award - UbiComp/ISWC 2021 Best Paper - MobiCASE, 2016 Inducted into CHI Academy, 2015
- Scientific career
- Fields: Human–computer interaction, ubiquitous computing, context-aware computing, human-centered computing
- Workplaces: University of Washington Information School
- Doctoral advisor: Gregory Abowd

Anind Dey is a computer scientist. He is the Dean of the University of Washington Information School. Dey is formerly the director of the Human-Computer Interaction Institute at Carnegie Mellon University. His research interests lie at the intersection of human–computer interaction and ubiquitous computing, focusing on how to make novel technologies more usable and useful. In particular, he builds tools that make it easier to build useful ubiquitous computing applications and supporting end users in controlling their ubiquitous computing systems.

== Career ==
Dey was born in Canada and now resides in Seattle, Washington. Dey received a Bachelor of Applied Science in computer engineering from Simon Fraser University in Burnaby, Canada in 1993. He received a Master of Science in aerospace engineering from Georgia Tech in 1995 and then went on to complete a second master's degree and a Ph.D. in computer science, also at Georgia Tech, in 2000. For his dissertation, he researched programming support for building context-aware applications: The Context Toolkit. He was a member of the Future Computing Environments research group in the College of Computing at Georgia Tech.

== Research ==
His research interests are feedback and control in ubiquitous computing, context-aware computing, toolkits and end-user programming environments, sensor-rich environments, information overload, ambient displays, privacy, human-computer interaction. He is among the most prolific authors in computer science and human-computer interaction.

=== Ubiquitous computing ===
Much of Dey's research deals with the construction and intersectional nature of ubiquitous computing. In 2002, in a research project at the University of California, Berkeley alongside Scott Lederer and Jennifer Mankoff, the team developed a conceptual model exploring the tangibility and accessibility of everyday end-user privacy in ubicomp environments. The model takes considerations from societal influences, contextual factors, and subjectivity to develop a far-reaching scope for ubicomp privacy. The model was then used to explore an interactional metaphor called situational faces, which makes the issue of privacy in ubiquitous computing environments more accessible to users. This facade presents an abstraction of advanced privacy settings to allow users to more easily establish their preferences.

=== Smart homes and intelligent environments ===
In 2006, Dey developed a research paper alongside Min Kyung Lee, Scott Davidoff, and John Zimmerman, all of Carnegie Mellon University, exploring and evaluating the usage of home automation technology and their effects on family life. As a collaboration between the School of Design and the Human-Computer Interaction Institute, the research sought to uncover areas of human-centered design that could complement family life, thus providing insight on the potential roles a smart home could play. Following a heuristic design process, the team interviewed dual-income families in their own homes, gauging cultural and ethnographic information, leading to the generation and experimentation of a design concept. The study concluded that such accommodations would allow families to avoid breakdowns in developed routines and improve emotional connectivity between family members and the home, while allowing parents to devote more time and attention to children.

=== Context awareness and self-monitoring technologies ===
In 2010, Dey, alongside Dana Pavel and Vic Callaghan of the School of Computer Science and Electronic Engineering at the University of Essex, evaluated and presented a highly interfaced system for users to understand and express their own lifestyles and habits through an analysis of compiled data into a story-based representation. Initial findings of the research suggested that data generated from a user base recording a user's daily activity reveals actionable personal goals that a user can draw from to improve their lifestyle. This research, presented at the 6th International Conference on Intelligent Environments in 2010, retrieved data from a number of devices and methods, including a Garmin Forerunner fitness monitor, a heart monitor, mobile phone usage data, and Internet history. This resulted in the design of a story-based presentation of data that connected the data to reveal tendencies within a user's lifestyle.

== Selected publications ==
- Dey, A.K., Mankoff, J. Designing mediation for context-aware applications. Transactions of Computer–Human Interaction special issue on Sensor-Based Interactions.
- Dey, A.K., Salber, D. Abowd, G.D. A Conceptual Framework and a Toolkit for Supporting the Rapid Prototyping of Context-Aware Applications, anchor article of a special issue on Context-Aware Computing. Human–Computer Interaction (HCI) Journal, Vol. 16 (2-4), 2001, pp. 97–166.
- Dey, A.K. Understanding and Using Context. Personal and Ubiquitous Computing Journal, Vol. 5 (1), 2001, pp. 4–7.
- Abowd, G.D., Dey, A.K., Brotherton, J., Orr, R.J. Context-awareness in Wearable and Ubiquitous Computing Virtual Reality Society International Journal, Vol. 3, 1999, pp. 200–211.
- Dey, A.K., Abowd, G.D., Wood, A. CyberDesk: a framework for providing self-integrating context-aware services. Knowledge based systems, Vol. 11 (1), September 1998, pp. 3–13.
