= ACM Transactions on Multimedia Computing, Communications, and Applications =

- Discipline: Multimedia
- Language: English
- Edited by: Abdulmotaleb El Saddik

Publication details
- History: 2005–present
- Publisher: ACM (United States)
- Frequency: Quarterly
- Impact factor: 3.144 (2020)

Standard abbreviations
- ISO 4: ACM Trans. Multimed. Comput. Commun. Appl.

Indexing
- ISSN: 1551-6857 (print); 1551-6865 (web)

Links
- Journal homepage; Online access; Online archive

ACM Transactions on Multimedia Computing, Communications, and Applications (TOMM) is a quarterly scientific journal that aims to disseminate the latest findings of note in the field of multimedia computing. It is published by the Association for Computing Machinery. In May 2014 the acronym has changed from TOMMCAP to TOMM.

The editor-in-chief is Abdulmotaleb El Saddik (Mohamed bin Zayed University of Artificial Intelligence). According to the Journal Citation Reports, the journal had a 2020 impact factor of 3.144.

== See also ==
- Association for Computing Machinery
- SIGMM
