= Abdulmotaleb El Saddik =

Lebanese-Canadian computer engineer and scientist

- Born: March 21, 1969 (age 57); Lebanon
- Other names: Abed, le.prof
- Education: Darmstadt University of Technology, Germany
- Website: https://mcrlab.net

Abdulmotaleb El Saddik (born March 21, 1969) is a Lebanese–Canadian computer engineer and scientist, currently a Distinguished University Professor at University of Ottawa. He is the Director of Multimedia Communications Research Laboratory since 2002. He is a member of the Engineering Institute of Canada, Institute of Electrical and Electronics Engineers, Canadian Academy of Engineering and Association for Computing Machinery.

== Education ==
He graduated from Darmstadt University of Technology with a diploma in electrical and computer engineering in 1995 and PhD in electrical and computer engineering in 2001.

== Career ==
He was elected Fellow of the Royal Society of Canada (FRSC 2020), the Canadian Academy of Engineering (FCAE 2009), the Institute of Electrical and Electronics Engineers (FIEEE 2009) and the Engineering Institute of Canada (FEIC 2010). In 2010, he became an ACM Distinguished Member. He was appointed Distinguished University Professor in 2014. He is the recipient of several national and international awards, including IEEE Canada C.C. Gotlieb Computer Medal and IEEE Canada A.G.L. McNaughton Gold Medal.

His present research focus is digital twins with five pillars: artificial intelligence, cybersecurity, IoT and aocial network, multimodal interactions, and quality of experience powered communication networks (5G and tactile internet). He is associate editor of the ACM Transactions on Multimedia Computing, Communications and Applications and guest editor for several IEEE Transactions and Journals. Dr El Saddik has been on technical program committees of numerous IEEE and ACM events. He has been the general chair and/or technical program chair of multiple international conferences, symposia and workshops on collaborative hapto-audio-visual environments, multimedia communications, and instrumentation and measurements. He is at present the director of Multimedia Communication Research Laboratory.

== Patents ==
1. US8294557B1 “Synchronous Interpersonal Haptic Communication System”, Abdulmotaleb El Saddik, Jongeun Cha, Mohamad Ahmad Eid, Fawaz Abdulaziz A Alsulaiman, Atif Mohammad Alamri, Lara Rahal, Daniel J. Martin.
2. US9699182B2 “Electrocardiogram (ECG) biometric authentication”, Abdulmotaleb El Saddik, Juan Sebastian Arteaga Falconi, Hussein Al Osman, granted July 2017
3. US9849377B2 “Plug and Play Tangible User Interface System”, Basim Hafidh, Hussein Al Osman, Ali Karime, Abdulmotaleb El Saddik, Jihad M. Alja'am, Ali M. Jaoua, Amal Dandashi, Moutaz S. Saleh.

=== Books ===
- Haptics Technologies – Bringing Touch to Multimedia
