= ACM Student Chapter =

Association for Computing Machinery's student society

ACM Student Chapter is the international Association for Computing Machinery's student society which provides opportunities to students for networking, learn together and share their knowledge. Its main focus is on building and developing members' passion for computer science.

ACM logo

== History ==
The first student chapter was founded in 1961 at the University of Louisiana at Lafayette. ACM is currently organized into over hundreds of local chapters over 800 colleges and universities throughout the world.

== Membership ==
The members of chapters are eligible for various benefits such as coding competitions, technical talks and mentoring sessions by experienced professionals.

== Notable chapters ==
- ACM student chapter of University of California, Los Angeles
- ACM student chapter of University of Washington
- ACM student chapter of University of Louisiana at Lafayette
- ACM student chapter of University of Pittsburgh
- ACM student chapter of Nazarbayev University - is the first and only ACM chapter in Kazakhstan
- ACM student chapter of KL University also known as KLH Bachupally ACM, is situated at the off-campus center in Hyderabad,specifically at the Bachupally Campus.
- ACM student chapter of University of St. Gallen.
