= Tadayoshi Kohno =

American data and computer security professor

Tadayoshi Kohno is an American computer scientist. He is a professor at Georgetown University. His research concerns computer security and privacy.

== Education and career ==
Kohno earned his bachelor of science degree from University of Colorado Boulder in 1999 and his Ph.D. from University of California San Diego in 2006.

Kohno was a professor in the Paul G. Allen School of Computer Science & Engineering at the University of Washington. He also held positions as an adjunct professor in the school of Electrical and Computer Engineering, the School of Information, and the School of Law; associate director for Diversity, Equity, Inclusion, and Access in the Allen School; co-director of the Security & Privacy Research Lab; and co-director of the Tech Policy Lab.

In 2026, Kohno joined Georgetown University's Department of Computer Science and Center for Digital Ethics.

He joined the Electronic Frontier Foundation Technical Advisory Board in 2020 and was an inaugural member of the Cyber Resilience Forum within the National Academies of Sciences, Engineering, and Medicine.

== Awards ==
Kohno is a Fellow of the Institute of Electrical and Electronics Engineers (IEEE) and an ACM Fellow. He was listed as part of MIT Technology Review's 2007 Young Innovators Under 35 for his work in creating systems-oriented provable security and was a recipient of the Sloan Research Fellowship in 2008. Kohno has received the IEEE Symposium on Security and Privacy Test of Time Award twice: in 2019 for his work initiating the modern field of medical device computer security (2019) and in 2020 for his work establishing the modern field of automotive computer security (2020) His work in automotive computer security also led to him winning a Golden Goose Award in 2021, an award for federally-funded basic research that is managed by the American Association for the Advancement of Science with bipartisan Congressional support. Kohno received the 2022 Allen School ACM Teaching Award in 2022.

== Research ==
- "Neurosecurity: security and privacy for neural devices," Tamara Denning B.S., Yoky Matsuoka Ph.D., and Tadayoshi Kohno Ph.D., Journal of Neurosurgery. This work coined the term "neurosecurity."
- "Improving the Security and Privacy of Implantable Medical Devices," William H. Maisel, M.D., M.P.H., and Tadayoshi Kohno, Ph.D., New England Journal of Medicine
- "Driverless: Who Is In Control?" Science Museum in London

== Fiction work ==
- "Telling Stories: On Culturally Responsive Artificial Intelligence," 2020.
- "Our Reality," a novella written to contribute to discussions on society, racism, and technology, 2021.
- "Off by One," column editor, IEEE Security & Privacy Magazine.
