= AnswerDash =

B2B software company in Seattle, Washington

Coordinates: 47°36′36.43″N 122°20′15.21″W

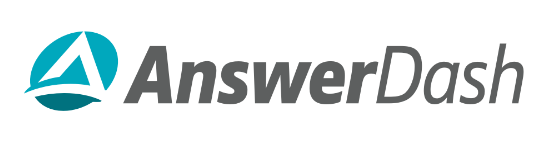
- Formerly: Qazzow
- Industry: Computer software, Internet
- Founded: 2012
- Founders: Jacob O. Wobbrock; Amy J. Ko; Parmit Chilana
- Headquarters: 999 Third Ave., Suite 700, Seattle, Washington, United States
- Key people: Don Davidge, CEO
- Total equity: $2.54 million (2015)
- Number of employees: 12 (2015)
- Parent: CloudEngage
- Website: answerdash.com

AnswerDash is a B2B software company that facilitates customer service for e-commerce businesses. AnswerDash was founded in Seattle, Washington in 2012 as a spin-off from the Information school of the University of Washington. Its software-as-a-service utilizes machine learning to create databases of context-sensitive support answers for end-users of webpages and mobile applications, thus reducing the need for human customer service. AnswerDash claims to be the first, and as of 2015, the world's leading provider of contextual point-and-click answer technology. In June 2020, AnswerDash was acquired by CloudEngage.

== History ==
The former logo of AnswerDash

The company was founded under name ″Qazzow″ in 2012 by three University of Washington employees: Jacob O. Wobbrock, a professor and the director of ACE Lab, Amy J. Ko, an associate professor the director of Code & Cognition Lab, and Parmit Chilana, a research assistant and a graduate student at the time, now a professor at Simon Fraser University. Jake Wobbrock assumed the responsibilities of CEO, and Amy J. Ko became the company's CTO. The idea of the key company's service stemmed from Parmit Chilana's dissertation on human–computer interaction. Her research has highlighted a very high proportion (up to 95%) of users' questions that are triggered by something seen on a website and should benefit from contextual help.

In November 2013, the company received $500,000 seed investment from W Fund to further develop its contextual Q&A service and in December 2013 additional $2.4 million from WRF Capital and Voyager Capital investment funds. In May 2014, the company re-branded itself to ″AnswerDash″ reacting to customers' confusion over the unusual sequence of letters in the original name.

In January 2015, Kevin Knoepp replaced Amy J. Ko as AnswerDash's CTO. AnswerDash service came on-line in May 2015. At the same time, after serving as a CEO for three years, Jake Wobbrock stepped down as the CEO. His performance was generally favored by the board, but Wobbrok has admitted his tendency to focusing on interesting scientific details that might not be relevant to business success. Wobbrock was replaced by Don Davidge, a former CEO of Impinj.

By the end of 2015, the company has "matured dramatically". After announcing the successful deployment of its software to Zendesk, in September, AnswerDash raised additional $2.9 million. In 2016, AnswerDash has recorded the biggest jump in GeekWire 200 rating, a ranked index of Pacific Northwest startups.

In June 2020, AnswerDash was acquired by Spokane, WA-based startup CloudEngage.

== Services ==
Offered under SaaS model by subscription, the service aims to eliminate the need for separate FAQs or ″help islands" offering contextual answers to end-users' questions. The service can be used on websites, web applications, and mobile applications. It employs a natural-language engine and machine learning technology that allows website and application owners to build the database of answers in a matter of several days.

In addition, AnswerDash utilizes data mining technology to provide business owners with valuable analytics on their consumers' behavior that leads to further improvement of their e-commerce services. AnswerDash claims to reduce the need of traditional customer support by 30 to 50 percent.

== See also ==
- Machine learning
- Data mining
