= SIGACCESS =

ACM's Special Interest Group on Accessible computing

Association for Computing Machinery Special Interest Group on Accessible Computing (ACM SIGACCESS)
- Founded: 1971
- Origins: SIGCAPH
- Region served: International
- Website: www.sigaccess.org

ACM SIGACCESS is the Association for Computing Machinery's Special Interest Group on accessible computing, an interdisciplinary group of academic and industrial researchers, clinicians and rehabilitation personnel, policy makers, end users, and students to develop technologies for use by people with disabilities.

== History ==
In 1964, the Association for Computing Machinery started a Committee on Professional Activities for the Blind, which published a newsletter for four years and organized a conference in 1969. The purpose of the committee was to promote and support blind people as capable programmers. The committee broadened its focus to include other people with disabilities and became the "Special Interest Group on Computers and the Physically Handicapped" (SIGCAPH) in 1971. In 2003, the SIG was renamed to SIGACCESS.

== Conferences ==
The ACM SIGACCESS Conference on Computers and Accessibility (ASSETS) is the flagship annual conference. All conference contributions are peer-reviewed by an international program committee, and accepted papers, posters and demonstrations are archived in the ACM Digital Library. All authors of accepted papers will be invited to submit extended versions of their papers to a special issue of the ACM Transactions on Accessible Computing (TACCESS).

SIGACCESS also sponsors other ACM workshops and conferences on a rotating basis.

== Journal ==
Transactions on Accessible Computing is a quarterly ACM journal that publishes refereed articles about accessible computing. The journal places emphasis on contributions with experimental results, but also accepts papers with new theoretical insights or positions.

SIGACCESS also publishes the Accessibility and Computing newsletter.

== Awards ==
=== ASSETS Paper Impact Award ===
The ASSETS Paper Impact Award is given to authors whose papers have made a significant impact on the field. Papers must be at least ten years old to be considered.

- 2025 - Freedom to roam: A study of mobile device adoption and accessibility for people with visual and motor disabilities; Author(s): Shaun K. Kane, Chandrika Jayant, Jacob O. Wobbrock, and Richard E. Ladner.
- 2023 - Empowering individuals with do-it-yourself assistive technology; Author(s): Amy Hurst and Jasmine Tobias.
- 2021 - Disability studies as a source of critical inquiry for the field of assistive technology; Author(s): Jennifer Mankoff, Gillian R. Hayes, and Devva Kasnitz.
- 2019 - Slide Rule: Making mobile touch screens accessible to blind people using multi-touch interaction techniques; Author(s): Shaun K. Kane, Jeffrey P. Bigham, and Jacob O. Wobbrock.
- 2017 - Providing access to graphical user interfaces—not graphical screens; Author(s): W. Keith Edwards, Elizabeth Mynatt and Kathryn Stockton
- 2015 - Designing for Dynamic Diversity: Interfaces for Older People; Author(s): Peter Gregor, Alan Newell, and Mary Zajicek
- 2013 - User Interface of a Home Page Reader; Author(s): Chieko Asakawa and Takashi Itoh

=== Outstanding Contribution to Computing and Accessibility Award ===
The Outstanding Contribution award is given in even-numbered years and recipients give a keynote presentation at the following ASSETS conference.

Previous recipients:

- 2026 - Jacob O. Wobbrock
- 2024 - Chieko Asakawa
- 2022 - Clayton Lewis
- 2020 - Jonathan Lazar
- 2018 - Judy Brewer
- 2016 - Richard E. Ladner
- 2014 - Vicki L. Hanson
- 2012 - John A. Gardner
- 2010 - Albert M. Cook
- 2008 - James Thatcher
