= Amy J. Ko =

American computer scientist

- Born: July 11, 1980 (age 46)
- Education: Oregon State University (B.S.); Carnegie Mellon University (Ph.D.)
- Known for: Human–computer interaction Software engineering Computing education Computer accessibility
- Awards: CHI Academy (2022); ACM Distinguished Member; ACM Distinguished Speaker
- Scientific career
- Fields: Computer science
- Workplaces: University of Washington Information School
- Thesis: Asking and Answering Questions about the Causes of Software Behaviors (2008)
- Doctoral advisor: Brad A. Myers

Amy J. Ko (born July 11, 1980) is an American computer scientist, and a professor in the University of Washington Information School, where she also serves as associate dean for academics. Her research involves human–computer interaction, software engineering, computing education, and computer accessibility.

== Education and career ==
Ko studied both computer science and psychology as an undergraduate honors student at Oregon State University, under the mentorship of computer scientist Margaret Burnett and psychologist Bob Uttl. After graduating in 2002, she went to Carnegie Mellon University for doctoral study in computer–human interaction, and received her Ph.D. in 2008. Her dissertation, Asking and Answering Questions about the Causes of Software Behaviors, was supervised by Brad A. Myers.

She joined the Information School of the University of Washington in 2008, with a courtesy appointment in the university's Paul G. Allen School of Computer Science & Engineering. She was promoted to associate professor in 2014 and full professor in 2020.

She was also a co-founder of AnswerDash, a spin-out from the University of Washington. She served as its chief technology officer from 2013 to 2015, and its chief scientist from 2015 until 2020, when it was acquired by CloudEngage.

== Recognition ==
Ko was named to the CHI Academy in 2022. She is also an ACM Distinguished Member.

== Personal life ==
Ko is a transgender woman; she came out as transgender in 2019, at age 39.
