= ACM Computing Surveys =

- Discipline: Computer science
- Language: English
- Edited by: Albert Y. Zomaya

Publication details
- History: 1969–present
- Publisher: Association for Computing Machinery (United States)
- Frequency: Quarterly
- Open access: yes
- Impact factor: 23.8 (2023)

Standard abbreviations
- ISO 4: ACM Comput. Surv.

Indexing
- ISSN: 0360-0300 (print); 1557-7341 (web)
- LCCN: 92660689
- OCLC no.: 68021555

Links
- Journal homepage; Online access; Online archive

ACM Computing Surveys is peer-reviewed quarterly scientific journal and is published by the Association for Computing Machinery. It publishes survey articles and tutorials related to computer science and computing. The journal was established in 1969 with William S. Dorn as founding editor-in-chief.

According to the Journal Citation Reports, the journal has a 2023 impact factor of 23.8. In a 2008 ranking of computer science journals, ACM Computing Surveys received the highest rank "A*". One of the most prestigious journals in computer science, ranked 1st in 2024 Journal Ranking in Computers (ranked 1/147 in Computer Science Theory & Methods).

== See also ==
- ACM Computing Reviews
