= University of Washington Information School =

Information school of the University of Washington in Seattle, Washington

Coordinates: 47°39′17.39″N 122°18′27.68″W

Information School
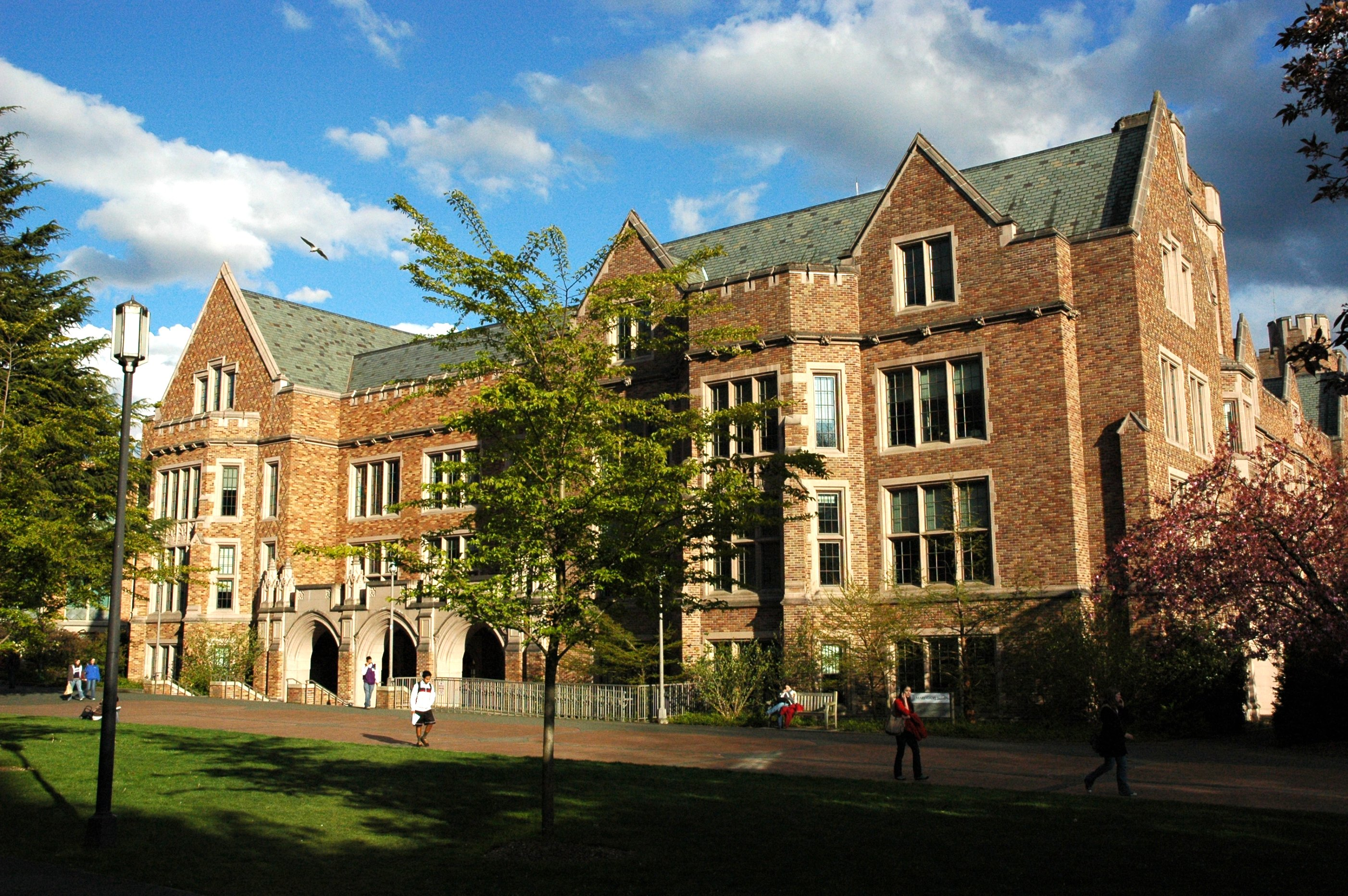
- Mary Gates Hall, home of the Information School
- Former names: Department of Library Economy (1911–1916); Library School (1916–1932); Department of Library Science (1932–1935); School of Librarianship (1935–1984); Graduate School of Library and Information Science (1984–2001)
- Type: Public
- Established: 1911
- Parent institution: University of Washington
- Dean: Anind Dey
- Location: Seattle, Washington, U.S.
- Website: ischool.uw.edu

The Information School (abbreviated as iSchool) is the information school of the University of Washington, a public research university in Seattle, Washington. Formerly the Graduate School of Library and Information Sciences since 1984, the Information School changed its focus and name in 2001.

The school offers undergraduate and graduate programs, including a BS in Informatics, a Master of Library Science MLIS degree, a Master of Science in Information Management, a Museology MA, and a PhD in Information Science.

== History ==
In 1911, it was a library school founded by Harriet Howe, Josephine Meissner, William E. Henry and Charles W. Smith, established in response to a growing need in the Western United States for highly trained, well-prepared librarians. Prior to 1911, librarians in the Pacific Northwest were trained through a six-week summer course offered at the University of Washington.

Name changes include: (1911-1916) Department of Library Economy; (1916-1932) Library School; (1932-1935) Department of Library Science in the Graduate School; (1935-1984) School of Librarianship; and (1984-2001) Graduate School of Library and Information Science. Finally, in 2001, the school was renamed the Information School, becoming the newest independent school at the University of Washington.

Dean Emeritus Michael Eisenberg said, “I want to bring together many of the best things that are going on at the UW, as well as introducing some new things. Information science is a discipline that studies the organization, management, processing and use of information by people in every possible environment. We also plan to take advantage of the leading role that Northwest companies are playing in this transformation. Our students will be trained to make important contributions to society. And our discipline also will be working closely with other campus departments. I believe there is a void in information technology—the ability to apply technology to various fields, as it can be done by an information professional.”

The Information School introduced several new continuing education certificate programs and degree programs in 2000 in response to changes in how people create, store, find, manipulate and share information. Under the leadership of Professor and Dean Emeritus Michael Eisenberg, the Information School introduced the Bachelor of Science in Informatics, online Master of Library and Information Science, Master of Science in Information Management, and Ph.D. in Information Science. In 2023, under the leadership of Professor and Dean Anind Dey, the University of Washington Museology program became a part of the Information School, adding an additional degree option with the MA in Museology.

=== Directors and deans ===
1. 1914-1931 William E. Henry
2. 1931-1945 Ruth Worden
3. 1945-1950 Robert L. Gitler
4. 1950-1955 Gladys Boughton (acting, 1950-1952)
5. 1955-1956 Dorothy Bevis (acting)
6. 1956-1972 Irving Lieberman
7. 1972-1974 Mae Benne (acting)
8. 1974-1981 Peter Hiatt
9. 1981-1992 Margaret E. Chisholm (acting, 1981-1983)
10. 1992-1993 Edmond Mignon (acting)
11. 1993-1996 Phyllis Van Orden
12. 1996-1997 Edward Bassett (acting)
13. 1997-1998 Betty Bengtson (acting)
14. 1998-2006 Michael Eisenberg
15. 2006-2017 Harry Bruce
16. 2017-2018 Carole Palmer (acting)
17. 2018–present Anind Dey

== Curriculum ==
=== Bachelor's program ===
The Information School offers one undergraduate degree: the Bachelor of Science in Informatics. The Informatics program is focused on the design of information systems and services, with particular emphasis on the following focus areas:

- Data Science
- Health & Well-Being
- Human-Computer Interaction
- Information Architecture
- Information Assurance and Cybersecurity
- Information Management
- Information & Society
- Software Development

The program touches on privacy issues, ethics, and management, as well as design, search engines, web development, and database design. Students study a broad range of areas in the information field, including: information management and technology, information-related research, interactive system design, human-computer interaction, and information science, with a goal of improving user experiences and technology access. The program's curriculum culminates in a design or research capstone project. The Informatics program has the largest enrollment of any program at the iSchool.

Graduates of the Informatics program typically go on to jobs such as:

- Information architect
- Web designer
- Content strategist
- Interface designer
- Network administrator
- IT director/manager
- Database manager
- Software engineer
- Technology solutions consultant
- Project manager
- Web developer
- Systems analyst
- Business analyst
- Program manager
- Product manager
- User experience designer
- Usability engineer
- Network manager
- Information security and assurance professional
- Software developer

==== Informatics minor ====
In 2017, the Information School added an Informatics minor. The minor complements a variety of majors on campus by offering students an opportunity to learn about data, design, policy, ethics, and code in order to solve information problems. It may be especially helpful to students in the humanities and social sciences who wish to know more about data, code, design, and policy.

The Informatics minor is open (not competitive or capacity-constrained, unlike most UW majors to which students must apply). In order to declare the Informatics minor, students need to have declared a major and should contact the advising staff of their major for the appropriate procedures. A minimum of 25 credits. A minimum grade of 2.0 must be earned in each class being used to fulfill the minor requirements.

=== Master's programs ===
The Information School offers two master's degrees: the Master of Science in Information Management (MSIM) and the Master of Library and Information Science (MLIS).

==== Master of Science in Information Management (MSIM) ====
The MSIM program (Master of Information Management) takes a multidisciplinary approach to the management of information systems and policy. It draws on computer science, business, information science, philosophy, design, and law to inform its curriculum. The MSIM program is offered residentially on the University of Washington campus and offered online.

Graduates work in a variety of professional areas and positions, including, but not limited to:

- Information Architect
- User Experience Designer
- Data Visualization Specialist
- Systems Analyst
- Data Scientist
- Software Design Engineer
- Risk Consultant
- Web Computing Specialist
- Network Administrator
- Database Developer
- Cybersecurity Professional
- Project Manager

==== Master of Library and Information Science (MLIS) ====
The MLIS is the iSchool's oldest degree. It is a professional degree that prepares students for careers in library and information professions. The MLIS program offers two degree options: 1) residential, and 2) online. In 2017 the iSchool's MLIS program was ranked #2 in the nation by U.S. News & World Report. The program consists of three elements: core courses, electives, and a final degree project. Program requirements are the same for students in the Residential MLIS and Online MLIS programs.

Additionally, the iSchool offers a third MLIS degree—the law librarianship master's program, a degree designed to prepare lawyers to serve as law librarians. The program is designed to take 10 months for full-time students and 22 months for part-time students to complete. The UW iSchool’s law librarianship program provides the highest level of preparation for a career in legal information. The curriculum blends a strong theoretical foundation in the principles of information science with the specialized legal research, technological and operational background they will need to thrive as a law librarian. An accompanying internship allows students to further build their technical skills.

=== Ph.D. program ===
The Ph.D. program is a theoretical, research-based doctorate in the field of Information Science. Research areas include:

- Biomedical and Health Informatics
- Data Science
- Digital Humanities
- Digital Youth and Learning Sciences
- Human-Computer Interaction and Design
- Indigenous Knowledge
- Information Organization and Management
- Library and Information Science

Ph.D. program alumni have gone on to careers in public sectors (tenure-track faculty, post-doctoral researchers, administrators in higher education) and private sectors (industry researchers, business/industry positions).

== Leadership ==
The Founding Board offers strategic advice to the dean with a focus on building awareness of and attracting resources to the Information School. The Founding Board also leads fundraising initiatives for the Information School. Anind Dey was named Dean of the Information School in 2017, and serves in this role currently.

== Faculty ==
As of October 2023, the Information School's faculty numbered 79 core members, along with numerous adjunct and affiliated faculty members.

Notable faculty include:

- Harry Bruce, dean emeritus
- Ryan Calo, professor
- Marika Cifor, assistant professor
- Lorcan Dempsey, Distinguished Practitioner in Residence
- Michael Eisenberg, dean emeritus
- Batya Friedman, professor emerita and co-creator of value sensitive design
- Amy J. Ko, professor, Informatics program chair, and inventor of the programming language Wordplay
- David M. Levy, professor emeritus
- Cheryl Metoyer-Duran, professor emerita known for her research in tribal knowledge
- Jacob O. Wobbrock, professor and mobile computing researcher

== Notable alumni ==
- Lester Asheim, 1937: Librarian and scholar of library science and film history.
- Beverly Cleary, 1939: Author of children's and young adult fiction.
- John Y. Cole, 1963: Librarian, historian and author.
- Tracie D. Hall, 2000: Librarian, author and advocate for the arts.

== Student organizations ==
The Information School offers opportunities for students to participate in professional and student communities. iSchool student groups include:

- AIMS (the Association of Information Management Students)
- ALISS UW (the Association of Information Science Students)
- ARLISNAP (Art Library Students and New ARLIS Professionals)
- ASIS&T (American Society for Information Science and Technology)
- DSA (Doctoral Student Association)
- Dubhacks (Tech and entrepreneurship focus)
- Dubstech (Tech community that hosts workshops, hackathons, and talks on design, data science, and software engineering)
- GPSS (Graduate and Professional Students Senate)
- iArts
- iPeer (a community for online MLIS students)
- iQueeries, (Providing a community and a voice for all LGBTQIA+ students at the iSchool)
- ISACA UW (Chapter of ISACA, a professional organization with a focus on cybersecurity and emerging tech)
- iServe (the iSchool's volunteer and service organization)
- IUGA (Informatics Undergraduate Association)
- SAA UW (Chapter of the Society of American Archivists)
- SALA (The University of Washington's Student Chapter of the American Library Association)
- SLA (Special Libraries Association)
- SOCLIS (Students of Color in Library and Information Science at UW)
- Student Leadership Council
- WINFO (Women In Informatics)

== Facilities ==
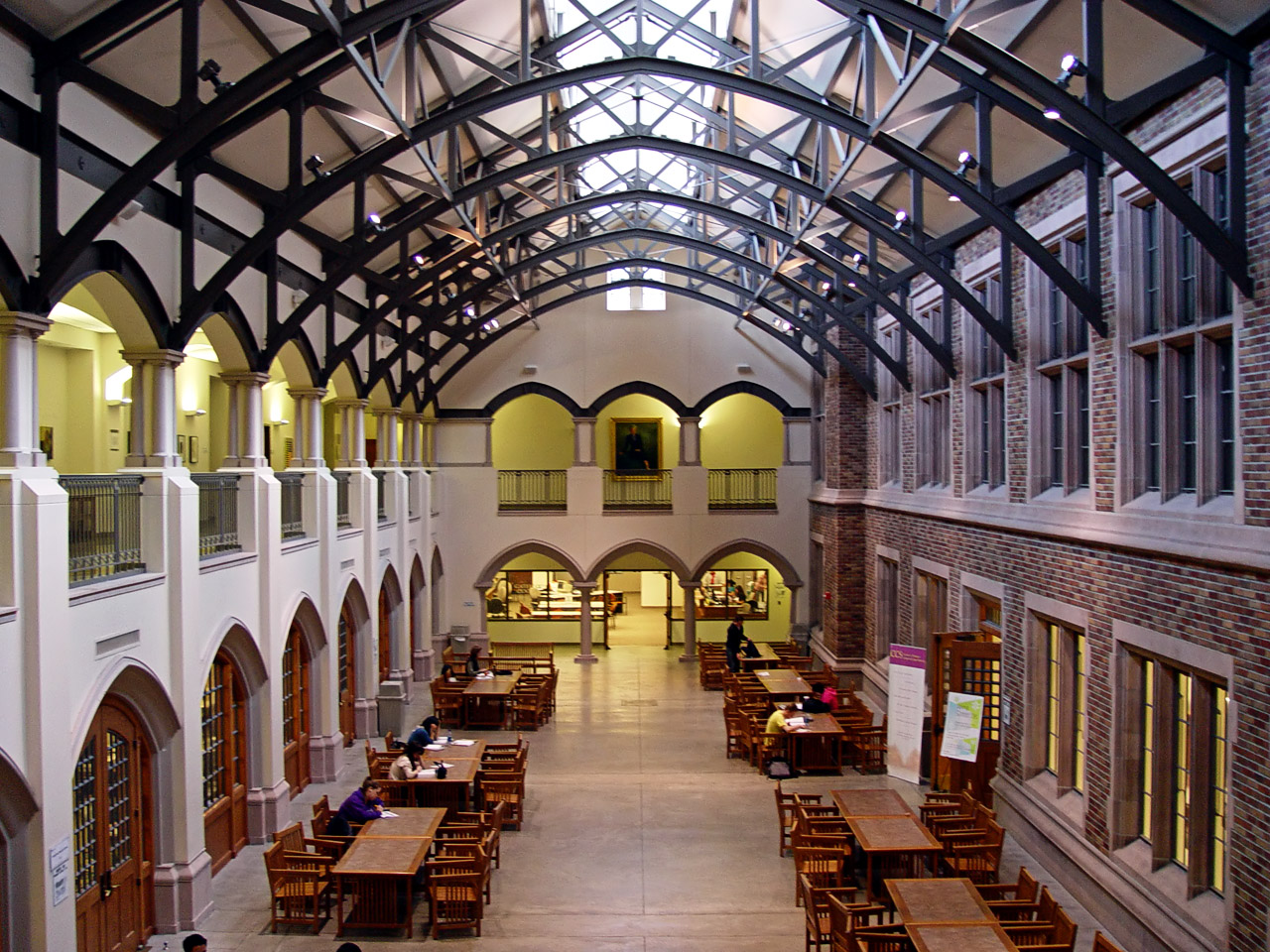
Mary Gates Hall interior

The school is in Mary Gates Hall, one of several university buildings bordering Drumheller Fountain. Formerly known as the Physics Building, it was renamed in 1995 after receipt of a $10 million gift from the family of Mary Maxwell Gates. In 1999 a $35 million expansion added updated classrooms and computer labs, office spaces, and commons, transforming the 1928 historic building and 1949 addition into a 175,000-square-foot quadrangle with a skylit commons at its center and a new main entry facing Suzzallo Library. The architects of the original building were John Graham & Company and the architects of record for the 1999 expansion were Bassetti Architects.

The Information School also has offices in the UW Tower and in the Suzzallo-Allen Libraries.
