= ACM Transactions on Computer Systems =

Coordinates: 40°45′0.2″N 73°59′32.1″W

- Discipline: Computer systems
- Language: English
- Edited by: Michael M. Swift

Publication details
- History: 1983–present
- Publisher: Association for Computing Machinery (United States)
- Frequency: Quarterly
- Open access: no
- License: ACM Copyright Policy

Standard abbreviations
- ISO 4: ACM Trans. Comput. Syst.

Indexing
- ISSN: 0734-2071 (print); 1557-7333 (web)

Links
- Journal homepage; Online access; Online archive

ACM Transactions on Computer Systems is a quarterly peer-reviewed scientific journal published by the Association for Computing Machinery. According to SCImago Journal Rank (SJR), the journal h-index is ranked 70, ranking it to Q1 in Computer Science (miscellaneous).
