= SIGCHI =

Academic association special interest group

Logo of the SIGCHI

The Special Interest Group on Computer–Human Interaction (SIGCHI) is one of the Association for Computing Machinery's special interest groups which is focused on human–computer interactions (HCI).

It hosts the flagship annual international HCI conference, CHI, with over 3,000 attendees, and publishes ACM Interactions and ACM Transactions on Computer-Human Interaction (TOCHI). It also sponsors over 20 specialized conferences and provides in-cooperation support to over 30 conferences.

SIGCHI has two membership publications, the ACM TechNews - SIGCHI Edition and ACM Interactions. Until 2000, the SIGCHI Bulletin was also published as a membership publication.

== History ==
SIGCHI was formed in 1982 by renaming and refocusing the Special Interest Group on Social and Behavioral Computing (SIGSOC). Lorraine Borman, previously editor of the SIGSOC Bulletin, was its first chair.

The formation of the ACM SIGCHI was first publicly announced in 1982 during the Human Factors in Computer Systems conference in Gaithersburg, Maryland, US, organized by Bill Curtis and Ben Shneiderman. In the year after, 1983, SIGCHI and the Computing Systems Group of the Human Factors Society co-sponsored the inaugural Conference on Human Factors in Computing Systems (CHI) in Boston. In 1988, the UIST and CSCW conferences were added.

== Publications ==
Apart from conference proceedings, SIGCHI publishes a number of periodicals.

- SIGCHI Bulletin
- ACM Interactions
- ACM Transactions on Computer-Human Interaction

== Awards ==
Each year SIGCHI inducts around 7 or 8 people into the CHI Academy, honouring them for their significant contribution to the field of human–computer interaction. It also gives out a CHI Lifetime Achievement Award for research and practice, the CHI Lifetime Service Award, and the CHI Social Impact Award. Since 2018, SIGCHI also awards the Outstanding Dissertation Award to recognize excellent thesis by Ph.D. recipients in HCI.

=== SIGCHI Lifetime Achievement Award ===
- 1998 - Douglas C. Engelbart (award called the SIGCHI Special Recognition Award in 1998)
- 2000 - Stuart K. Card
- 2001 - Ben Shneiderman
- 2002 - Donald A. Norman
- 2003 - John M. Carroll
- 2004 - Tom Moran
- 2005 - Tom Landauer
- 2006 - Judith S. Olson and Gary M. Olson
- 2007 - James D. Foley
- 2008 - Bill Buxton
- 2009 - Sara Kiesler
- 2010
  - Practice: Karen Holtzblatt
  - Research: Lucy Suchman
- 2011
  - Practice: Larry Tesler
  - Research: Terry Winograd
- 2012
  - Practice: Joy Mountford
  - Research: Dan R. Olsen, Jr.
- 2013
  - Practice: Jakob Nielsen
  - Research: George G. Robertson
- 2014
  - Practice: Gillian Crampton Smith
  - Research: Steve Whittaker
  - Special Recognition: Ted Nelson
- 2015
  - Practice: Susan M. Dray
  - Research: James D. Hollan
- 2016
  - Practice: Jeff A. Johnson
  - Research: Robert E. Kraut
- 2017
  - Practice: Ernest Edmonds
  - Research: Brad A. Myers
- 2018
  - Practice: Arnold M. Lund
  - Research: Steven K. Feiner
- 2019
  - Practice: Daniel Rosenberg
  - Research: Hiroshi Ishii
- 2020
  - Practice: David Canfield Smith
  - Research: Susan T. Dumais
- 2021
  - Practice: John T. Richards
  - Research: Scott Hudson
- 2022
  - Practice: Steven Pemberton
  - Research: Yvonne Rogers
- 2023
  - Practice: Deborah J. Mayhew
  - Research: Gregory Abowd
- 2024
  - Practice: Elizabeth Churchill
  - Research: Susanne Bødker, Jodi Forlizzi, James Landay, Wendy Mackay
- 2025
  - Research: Paul Dourish, Pattie Maes
- 2026
  - Research: Lorrie Faith Cranor, Joseph A. Konstan

=== SIGCHI Lifetime Service Award ===
- 2001 - Austin Henderson
- 2002 - Dan R. Olsen, Jr.
- 2003 - Lorraine Borman
- 2004 - Robin Jeffries and Gene Lynch
- 2005 - Gary Perlman, Marilyn Mantei Tremaine, Sara Bly, Don J. Patterson, and John Morris
- 2006 - Susan M. Dray
- 2007 - Richard I. Anderson
- 2008 - John Karat and Marian Williams
- 2009 - Clare-Marie Karat and Steven Pemberton
- 2010 - Mary Czerwinski
- 2011 - Arnie Lund and Jim Miller
- 2012 - Michael Atwood and Kevin Schofield
- 2013 - Joseph A. Konstan
- 2014 - Wendy Mackay and Tom Hewett
- 2015 - Michel Beaudouin-Lafon and Jean Scholtz
- 2016 - Gary M. Olson and Gerrit van der Veer
- 2017 - Scott E. Hudson and Zhengjie Liu
- 2018 - Maria Francesca Constabile and John C. Thomas
- 2019 - Bill Hefley
- 2020 - Gilbert Cockton and Catherine Plaisant
- 2021 - Wendy Kellogg and Philippe Palanque
- 2022 - Geraldine Fitzpatrick
- 2023 - Elizabeth Churchill and Loren Terveen
- 2024 - None
- 2025 - Kristina Höök, Yoshifumi Kitamura, and Aaron Quigley
- 2026 - Cliff Lampe, Helena Mentis

=== SIGCHI Social Impact Award ===
- 2005 - Gregg Vanderheiden
- 2006 - Ted Henter
- 2007 - Gregory Abowd and Gary Marsden
- 2008 - Vicki Hanson
- 2009 - Helen Petrie
- 2010 - Ben Bederson and Allison Druin
- 2011 - Allen Newell and Clayton Lewis
- 2012 - Batya Friedman
- 2013 - Sara J. Czaja
- 2014 - Richard E. Ladner
- 2015 - Leysia Palen
- 2016 - Jonathan Lazar
- 2017 - Jacob O. Wobbrock and Indrani Medhi Thies
- 2018 - Lorrie Faith Cranor
- 2019 - Gillian Hayes
- 2020 - Ronald M. Baecker and Bonnie Nardi
- 2021 - Maria Cecília Calani Baranauskas, Andy Dearden and Juan Gilbert
- 2022 - Liz Gerber, Jennifer Mankoff and Aaditeshwar Seth
- 2023 - Shaowen Bardzell, Munmun de Choudhury and Nicola Dell
- 2024 - Jan Gulliksen, Amy Ogan, Kate Starbird
- 2025 - Tiago Guerreiro, Alexis Hiniker, Kentaro Toyama
- 2026 - Jon E. Froehlich, Jacki O’Neill, Volker Wulf

=== SIGCHI Outstanding Dissertation Award ===
- 2018 - Stefanie Mueller and Blase Ur
- 2019 - Chris Elsden, Anna Maria Feit and Robert Xiao
- 2020 - Katta Spiel and Paul Strohmeier
- 2021 - Josh Andres, Arunesh Mathur and Qian Yang
- 2022 - Aakash Gautam, Fred Hohman and Anna Lisa Martin-Niedecken
- 2023 - Megan Hofmann, Dhruv Jain, Kai Lukoff
- 2024 - Karan Ahuja, Azra Ismail, Courtney N. Reed, Nicholas Vincent, Yixin Zou
- 2025 - Leona Holloway, Katerina Stepanova, Anupriya Tuli, Zijie Jay Wang, Nur Yildirim
- 2026 - Humphrey Curtis, Martin Feick, Eunkyung Jo, Sukran Karaosmanoglu, Ben Zhang

=== SIGCHI Special Recognitions ===
- 2025 - Gregory Abowd, Cecilia Aragon, Nadia Campo Woytuk, Mark Colley, Gustavo Lopez, Jasmine Lu, Jooyoung Park, Nadya Peek, Anicia Peters, Christian Sturm, the Google/academia Android XR interaction team
- 2026 - AVELA, Sonya S. Kwak, Shaimaa Lazem, Maristella Matera, Brenna Schaffner, Phoebe Toups Dugas

== SIGCHI Executive Committee ==
SIGCHI is governed by a set of by-laws and SIGCHI’s Elected Officers are the President, the Executive Vice-President, the Vice-President for Membership and Communications, the Vice-President for Finance, and two Vice-Presidents at large. The Executive Committee (EC) also includes editors of membership publications and appointed officers including the Vice-President for Publications, the Vice-President for Conferences, the Vice-President for Chapters, the Vice-President for Operations, and the immediate past Chair.

=== 2009–2012 ===
President: Gerrit van der Veer

=== 2012–2015 ===
President: Gerrit van der Veer

=== 2015–2018 ===
From July 2015 to July 2018, the SIGCHI President was Loren Terveen of GroupLens Research at the University of Minnesota and the Vice President was Helena Mentis of University of Maryland Baltimore County

=== 2018–2021 ===
From July 2018 to July 2021, the SIGCHI President was Helena Mentis of University of Maryland Baltimore County with Vice President Cliff Lampe of University of Michigan.

=== 2021–2024 ===
The current SIGCHI President is Neha Kumar with Vice President Shaowen Bardzell. The President and VP run as a team and were elected to the positions for a three-year term.

== Sponsored Conferences ==
Apart from CHI, SIGCHI sponsors or co-sponsors over 20 specialized conferences in topics related to HCI.

- ACM Conference on Supporting Groupwork (GROUP)
- International Conference on Tangible, Embedded and Embodied Interaction (TEI)
- International Conference on Intelligent User Interfaces (IUI)
- ACM/IEEE International Conference on Human Robot Interaction (HRI)
- Symposium on Eye Tracking Research and Applications (ETRA)
- ACM International Conference on Interactive Media Experiences (IMX)
- Collective Intelligence (CI)
- Interaction, Design and Children (IDC)
- ACM SIGCHI Symposium on Engineering Interactive Computing Systems (EICS)
- Designing Interactive Systems Conference (DIS)
- International Conference on User Modeling, Adaptation, and Personalization (UMAP)
- ACM International Joint Conference on Pervasive and Ubiquitous Computing (Ubicomp)
- International Conference on Automotive User Interfaces and Interactive Vehicular Applications (AutomotiveUI)
- ACM Conference on Recommender Systems (RecSys)
- International Conference on Human-Computer Interaction with Mobile Devices and Services (MobileHCI)
- Computer-Supported Cooperative Work (CSCW)
- ACM Symposium on User Interface Software and Technology (UIST)
- International Conference on Multimodal Interaction (ICMI)
- Symposium on Spatial User Interaction (SUI)
- ACM Symposium and Virtual Reality Software and Technology
- Symposium on Computer-Human Interaction in Play (CHIPLAY)
- Interactive Surfaces and Spaces (ISS)
- Creativity and Cognition (C&C)

== Grants ==
SIGCHI provides resources for the community to expand, grow and communicate in the form of Grants.

- SIGCHI Development Fund: Intended to support community-led initiatives to spur communication among local communities.
- SIGCHI Early Career Mentoring fund: to support early-career scholars to participate in a meeting for mentorship.
- SIGCHI Student Travel Grants: to provide students the opportunity to attend any of the SIGCHI Conferences.
