= SIGCHI Bulletin =

The SIGCHI Bulletin is one of the two membership publications of ACM SIGCHI, the Special Interest Group on Computer Human Interaction. The other publication is ACM interactions.

The Bulletin was first published in July 1982, though bearing the volume number 14, since it was a result of the renaming of the SIGSOC Bulletin, after SIGSOC (Special Interest Group on Social and Behavioral Computing) renamed itself to SIGCHI. It was published quarterly until 1999 when it became bi-monthly, but returned to quarterly in 2005.

The Bulletin was a paper publication until October 1995, after which it was published simultaneously on paper and on the Web, until July 2003, when it became online-only.

In 2000, SIGCHI made interactions its member publication. Up until then members had had to subscribe to it separately. From that point, the Bulletin was published as a supplement to interactions.

== Editors ==
- July 1982 - Apr. 1985) Ann Janda
- July 1985 Lorraine Borman (acting)
- Oct. 1985 - July 1990 Peter Orbeton
- Oct. 1990 - Oct. 1993 Bill Hefley
- Jan. 1994 - Oct. 1998 Steven Pemberton
- Jan. 1999 - July 1999 Ayman Mukerji
- Oct. 1999 - 2003 Joseph A. Konstan
- July 2003 - Nov. 2004 Jonathan Arnowitz
- Jan. 2005 - 2007 Brian Bailey
- 2008 - Mark Apperley
