= Gary Olson =

Gary Olson may refer to:

- Gary Olson (political scientist) (fl. 1970s–1990s), professor of political science
- Gary A. Olson (born 1954), scholar of rhetoric and culture
- Gary M. Olson (born 1944), professor specializing in the fields of human-computer interaction and computer supported cooperative work

== See also ==
- Gary Olsen (1957–2000), English actor
