= Austin Henderson =

Canadian computer scientist

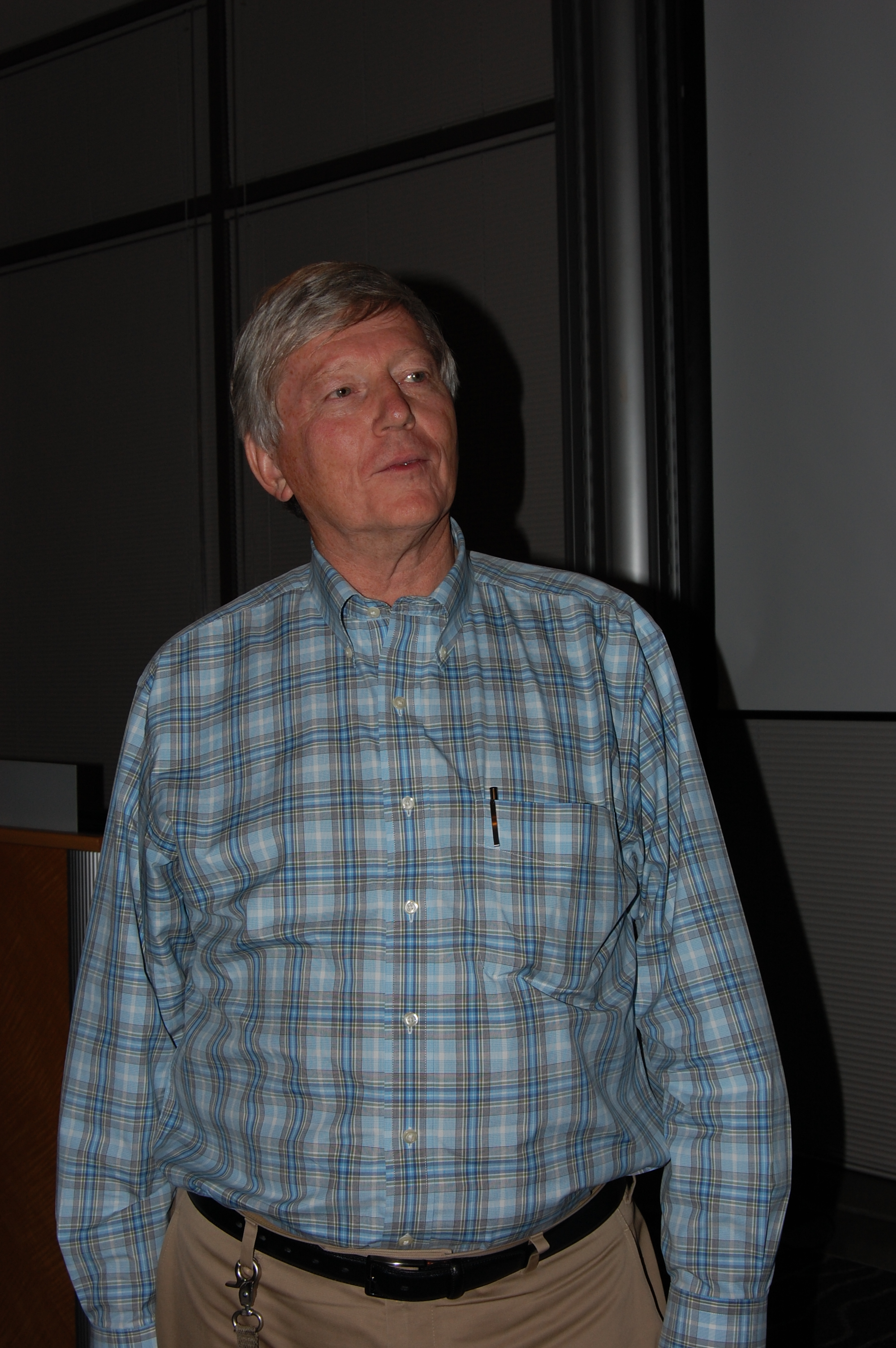

D. Austin Henderson is a Canadian computer scientist who pioneered work in email, virtual desktops, computer-supported collaboration, and human computer interaction.

He chaired one of the first SIGCHI CHI conferences in 1985.

He was chair of ACM SIGCHI, the special interest group in computer-human interaction from 1991 to 1993

He is an inductee of the CHI Academy.
