= Wendy Mackay =

Computer Scientist

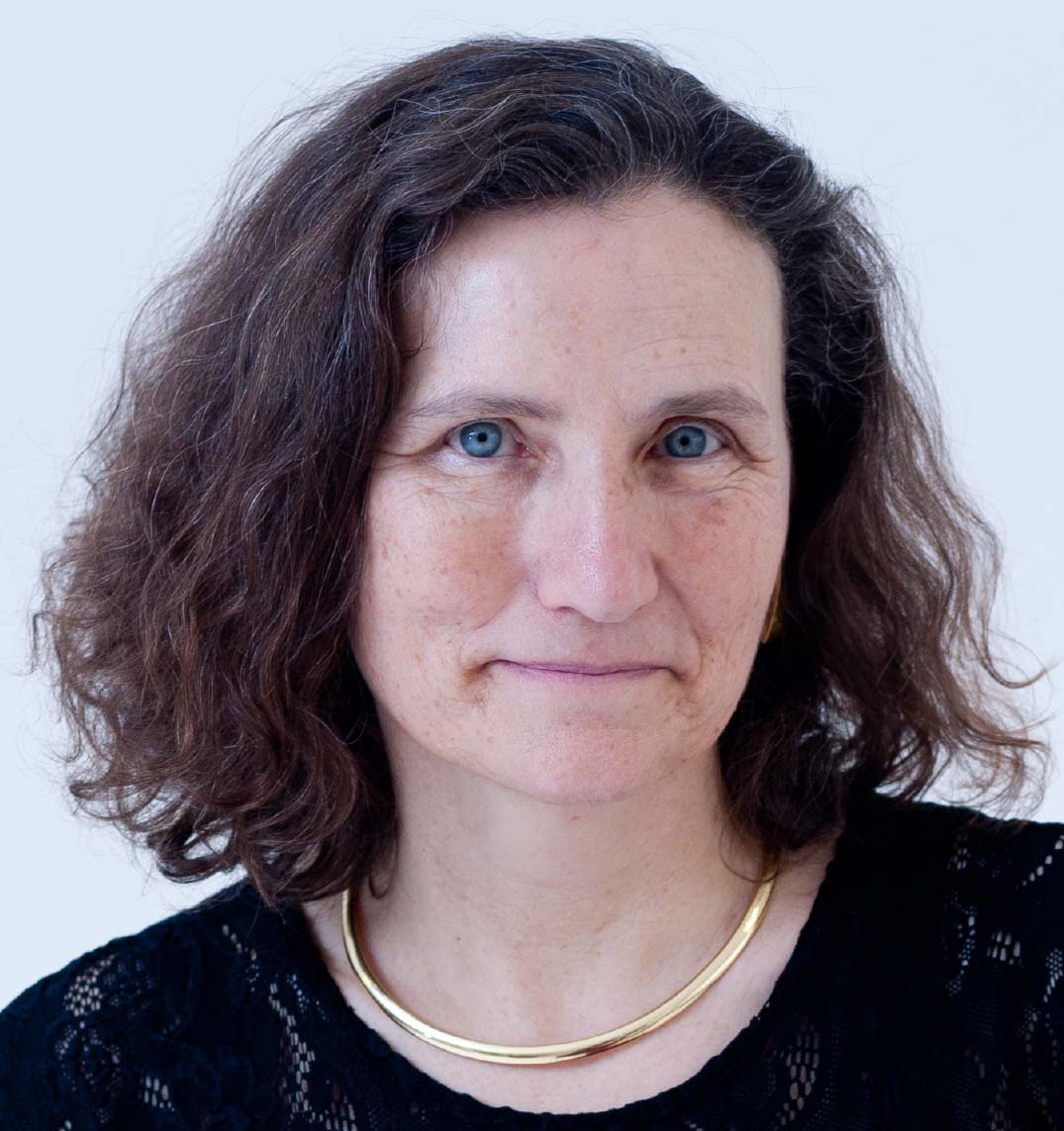
- Wendy Mackay in 2014
- Born: Wendy Elizabeth Mackay; May 25, 1956 (age 70); Montreal, Quebec, Canada
- Citizenship: United States, Canada
- Education: University of California, San Diego (BA); Northeastern University (MA); Massachusetts Institute of Technology (PhD)
- Spouse: Michel Beaudouin-Lafon (m. 1993)
- Awards: CHI Academy (2003); ACM Fellow (2019); Suffrage Science award (2020); ACM SIGCHI Lifetime Research Award (2024)
- Scientific career
- Fields: Human computer interaction
- Workplaces: INRIA; Xerox PARC; Université Paris-Sud; University of Aarhus; Stanford University; Digital Equipment Corporation
- Thesis: Users and customizable software : a co-adaptive phenomenon (1990)
- Doctoral advisor: Wanda Orlikowski
- Website: ex-situ.lri.fr/people/mackay

Wendy Elizabeth Mackay (born on May 25, 1956) is a Canadian researcher specializing in human-computer interaction. She has served in all of the roles on the SIGCHI committee, including Chair. She is a member of the CHI Academy and a recipient of a European Research Council Advanced grant. She has been a visiting professor in Stanford University between 2010 and 2012, and received the ACM SIGCHI Lifetime Service Award in 2014.

She leads research at Exsitu, while serving as research director with INRIA Saclay in France. Her research investigates of human computer interaction (HCI) and aims to develop and to facilitate the interfaces that provide users with the tools needed to accomplish the task at hand.

== Education ==
Mackay received a Bachelor of Arts degree in psychology from University of California, San Diego in 1977. She received a Master of Arts in experimental psychology from Northeastern University in 1979 and a Doctor of Philosophy in Management of Technological Innovation from Massachusetts Institute of Technology in 1990. Her doctoral research was supervised by Wanda Orlikowski.

== Career and research ==
After graduating from Northeastern University, Mackay worked in several roles at Digital Equipment Corporation (DEC). In 1983, she focused formed a multimedia research group there and became a visiting scientist at MIT. At DEC, she created over 30 multimedia projects, including the first interactive video system which was titled IVIS. From 1987 to 1990 she worked on her Ph.D. at MIT and eventually worked as a senior research scientist at Xerox PARC where she published an award-winning special issue of Communications of the ACM on computer augmented environments. She also worked on augmented paper interfaces and explored the integration of paper with the online world. Afterward, she taught at Stanford University for two years as a visiting professor.

Her scientific contributions include writing the original toolkit software for IVIS, the world's first interactive video system. She also conducted the first major study of electronic mail while at MIT. Her design methods are taught in institutions around the world such as Stanford, MIT, Georgia Tech, and University of British Columbia. Mackay has published over two hundred research articles on human-computer interaction and has served as program chair or on the program committees of ACM Conference on Human Factors in Computing Systems (CHI), ACM Symposium on User Interface Software and Technology (UIST), ACM Computer-supported cooperative work (CSCW), ACM DIS and ACM Multimedia.

=== Awards and honors ===
- 2009, Elected a member of the CHI Academy
- 2009, Conference on Human Factors in Computing Systems (CHI) best paper award, top 1% of accepted papers, for Musink: Composing Music through Augmented Drawing
- 2011, SIGCHI Best Paper Award: Mid-air Pan-and-Zoom on Wall-sized Displays
- 2014, SIGCHI Lifetime Service Award
- 2019, ACM Fellow "for contributions to human-computer interaction, mixed reality and participatory design, and leadership in ACM SIGCHI".
- 2020, Suffrage Science award
- 2024, ACM SIGCHI Lifetime Research Award for her contributions to the study of Human-Computer Interaction

== Personal life ==
Wendy married Michel Beaudouin-Lafon on August 11, 1993 in Avalon, California. She has two sons - Alexandre and Matthew Thomas Beaudouin-Mackay.
