= Participatory design =

Active involvement of all stakeholders in the design process

Participatory design (originally co-operative design or design participation, now often co-design and also co-creation) is an approach to design that attempts to involve a variety of stakeholders (e.g. employees, partners, customers, citizens, end users) in the design process to help ensure the result meets their needs and is usable. Participatory design is an approach which is focused on processes and procedures of design and is not a design style. The term is used in a variety of fields, e.g. software design, urban design, architecture, landscape architecture, product design, sustainability, graphic design, industrial design, planning, and health services development, as a way of creating environments that are more satisfactory and appropriate to their inhabitants' and users' practical, cultural, emotional and spiritual needs. It is also one approach to placemaking.

Participatory design has been used in many settings and at various scales. For some, this approach has a political dimension of user empowerment and democratization. This inclusion of external parties in the design process does not excuse designers of their responsibilities. In their article "Participatory Design and Prototyping", Wendy Mackay and Michel Beaudouin-Lafon support this point by stating that "[a] common misconception about participatory design is that designers are expected to abdicate their responsibilities as designers and leave the design to users. This is never the case: designers must always consider what users can and cannot contribute."

== Definition ==
In participatory design, participants (putative, potential or future) are invited to cooperate with designers, researchers and developers during certain parts of a design process. The broader definition of co-design requires the end user's participation not only in evaluating proposals but also in idea generation. Potentially, they participate during several stages of an innovation process: during the initial exploration and problem definition both to help define the problem and to focus ideas for solution, and, during development, they help evaluate proposed solutions.

In the broader discourse on collaborative processes, terminology such as co-design, co-creation, and urban co-creation is often debated and differentiated. For example, In "Co-designing for Society", Deborah Szebeko and Lauren Tan list various precursors of co-design, and differentiate co-design from participatory design because co-design "includes all stakeholders of an issue not just the users, throughout the entire process from research to implementation."

Similarly, Maria Gabriela Sanchez and Lois Frankel proposed that "Co-design may be considered . . . as an interdisciplinary process that involves designers and non-designers in the development of design solutions" and that "the success of the interdisciplinary process depends on the participation of all the stakeholders in the project".

According to Elizabeth Sanders and Pieter Stappers "Co-creation is a very broad term with applications ranging from the physical to the metaphysical and from the material to the spiritual", with co-design being a specific instance of co-creation.

Within urban studies, urban co-creation has been proposed to describe participatory processes that are genuinely inclusive, emphasizing the active, bottom-up involvement of residents, communities, and grassroots organizations in shaping urban environments. Seve et al. (2022) argue that urban co-creation encompasses a wide range of practices—including appropriation of space, self-construction, guerrilla gardening, and tactical urbanism—that challenge traditional top-down models. They contend that the term participation alone is ambiguous and insufficient to describe the diversity of collaborative practices and dynamics in urban transformation.

As described by Sanders and Stappers, one could position co-design as a form of human-centered design across two different dimensions. One dimension is the emphasis on research or design, another dimension is how much people are involved. Therefore, there are many forms of co-design, with different degrees of emphasis on research or design and different degrees of stakeholder involvement. For instance, one of the forms of co-design which involves stakeholders strongly early at the front end design process in the creative activities is generative co-design. Generative co-design is increasingly being used to involve different stakeholders, such as patients, care professionals and designers actively in the creative making process to develop health services.

== History ==
From the 1960s onward there was a growing demand for greater consideration of community opinions in major decision-making. In Australia many people believed that they were not being planned 'for' but planned 'at' (Nichols 2009). A lack of consultation made the planning system seem paternalistic and without proper consideration of how changes to the built environment affected its primary users. In Britain "the idea that the public should participate was first raised in 1965." In 1968 the UK Government set up a Committee to consider Public Participation in Planning, which reported in 1969, recommending little more than that the public should be able to comment on planning proposals. In 1971 the first international conference of the Design Research Society, in Manchester UK, was on 'Design Participation', which took a broad view of emerging practices of participation in design, from radical technology and computer aids in architectural design to inclusive design for disabled users.

The level of participation is an important issue. One of the most influential works on citizen participation is the article "A Ladder of Citizen Participation", published by Sherry Arnstein in 1969. In this paper, Arnstein outlines a model consisting of eight levels of participation, ranging from manipulation to citizen control, the latter representing full and genuine participation. At a minimum public workshops and hearings have now been included in almost every planning endeavour. Yet this level of consultation can simply mean information about change without detailed participation. Involvement that 'recognises an active part in plan making' has not always been straightforward to achieve. Participatory design has attempted to create a platform for active participation in the design process, for end users.

=== History in Scandinavia ===
In several Scandinavian countries, during the 1960s and 1970s, participatory design was rooted in work with trade unions; its ancestry also includes action research and sociotechnical design. Research projects on user participation in systems development date back to the 1970s. The so-called "collective resource approach" developed strategies and techniques for workers to influence the design and use of computer applications at the workplace: The Norwegian Iron and Metal Workers Union (NJMF) project took a first move from traditional research to working with people, directly changing the role of the union clubs in the project.

The Scandinavian projects developed an action research approach, emphasizing active co-operation between researchers and workers of the organization to help improve the latter's work situation. While researchers got their results, the people whom they worked with were equally entitled to get something out of the project. The approach built on people's own experiences, providing for them resources to be able to act in their current situation. The view of organizations as fundamentally harmonious—according to which conflicts in an organization are regarded as pseudo-conflicts or "problems" dissolved by good analysis and increased communication—was rejected in favor of a view of organizations recognizing fundamental "un-dissolvable" conflicts in organizations (Ehn & Sandberg, 1979).

In the Utopia project (Bødker et al., 1987, Ehn, 1988), the major achievements were the experience-based design methods, developed through the focus on hands-on experiences, emphasizing the need for technical and organizational alternatives (Bødker et al., 1987).

The parallel Florence project (Gro Bjerkness & Tone Bratteteig) started a long line of Scandinavian research projects in the health sector. In particular, it worked with nurses and developed approaches for nurses to get a voice in the development of work and IT in hospitals. The Florence project put gender on the agenda with its starting point in a highly gendered work environment.

The 1990s led to a number of projects including the AT project (Bødker et al., 1993) and the EureCoop/EuroCode projects (Grønbæk, Kyng & Mogensen, 1995).

Later, it became a major challenge to participatory design to embrace the fact that much technology development no longer happens as design of isolated systems in well-defined communities of work (Beck, 2002).

== Co-design ==
Co-design refers to designated designers working together with the intended product/system users and other stakeholders throughout the process of designing new or improved products and systems. It is especially focused on including the insights, experiences and input from end-users of a product, system or service, with the aim to develop more appropriate, acceptable and satisfactory outcomes. It is often used by designers who recognize the difficulty in properly understanding the usage, societal or cultural scenarios of those for whom the new design is intended.

Research suggests that designers create more innovative concepts and ideas when working within a co-design environment with others than they do when creating ideas on their own. Companies also increasingly rely on their user communities to generate new product ideas, marketing them as "user-designed" products to the wider consumer market; consumers who are not actively participating but observe this user-driven approach show a preference for products from such firms over those driven by designers. This preference is attributed to an enhanced identification with firms adopting a user-driven outlook, with consumers feeling empowerment even if being only indirectly involved in the design process, leading to a preference for the firm's products.

== Areas of application ==
=== In the built environment ===
Participatory design has many applications in development and changes to the built environment. It has particular currency to planners and architects, in relation to placemaking and community regeneration projects. It potentially offers a more democratic approach to the design process as it involves more than one stakeholder. By incorporating a variety of views there is greater opportunity for successful outcomes.

Many local governments require community consultation in any major changes to the built environment. Community involvement in the planning process is almost a standard requirement in most strategic changes. Community involvement in local decision making creates a sense of empowerment. The City of Melbourne Swanston Street redevelopment project received over 5000 responses from the public allowing them to participate in the design process by commenting on seven different design options. While the City of Yarra recently held a "Stories in the Street" consultation, to record peoples ideas about the future of Smith Street. It offered participants a variety of mediums to explore their opinions such as mapping, photo surveys and storytelling. Although local councils are taking positive steps towards participatory design as opposed to traditional top down approaches to planning, many communities are moving to take design into their own hands.

==== Public interest design ====
Public interest design is a design movement, extending to architecture, with the main aim of structuring design around the needs of the community. At the core of its application is participatory design. Through allowing individuals to have a say in the process of design of their own surrounding built environment, design can become proactive and tailored towards addressing wider social issues facing that community. Public interest design is meant to reshape conventional modern architectural practice. Instead of having each construction project solely meet the needs of the individual, public interest design addresses wider social issues at their core. This shift in architectural practice is a structural and systemic one, allowing design to serve communities responsibly. Solutions to social issues can be addressed in a long-term manner through such design, serving the public, and involving it directly in the process through participatory design. The built environment can become the very reason for social and community issues to arise if not executed properly and responsibly. Conventional architectural practice often does cause such problems since only the paying client has a say in the design process.

Portland, Oregon City Repair Project was a form of participatory design involving the community co-designing problem areas together to make positive changes to their environment. It involved collaborative decision-making and design without traditional involvement from local government or professionals but instead run on volunteers from the community. The process has created successful projects such as intersection repair, which saw a misused intersection develop into a successful community square.

In Malawi, a UNICEF WASH programme trialled participatory design development for latrines in order to ensure that users participate in creating and selecting sanitation technologies that are appropriate and affordable for them. The process provided an opportunity for community members to share their traditional knowledge and skills in partnership with designers and researchers.

=== In software development ===
In the English-speaking world, the term has a particular currency in the world of software development, especially in circles connected to Computer Professionals for Social Responsibility (CPSR), who have put on a series of Participatory Design Conferences. It overlaps with the approach extreme programming takes to user involvement in design, but (possibly because of its European trade union origins) the Participatory Design tradition puts more emphasis on the involvement of a broad population of users rather than a small number of user representatives.

Participatory design can be seen as a move of end-users into the world of researchers and developers, whereas empathic design can be seen as a move of researchers and developers into the world of end-users. There is a very significant differentiation between user-design and user-centered design in that there is an emancipatory theoretical foundation, and a systems theory bedrock (Ivanov, 1972, 1995), on which user-design is founded.

Participatory work in software development has historically tended toward two distinct trajectories, one in Scandinavia and northern Europe, and the other in North America. The Scandinavian and northern European tradition has remained closer to its roots in the labor movement (e.g., Beck, 2002; Bjerknes, Ehn, and Kyng, 1987). The North American and Pacific Rim tradition has tended to be both broader (e.g., including managers and executives as "stakeholders" in design) and more circumscribed (e.g., design of individual features as contrasted with the Scandinavian approach to the design of entire systems and design of the work that the system is supposed to support) (e.g., Beyer and Holtzblatt, 1998; Noro and Imada, 1991). However, some other has tended to combine the two approaches (Bødker et al., 2004; Muller, 2007).

== Research methodology ==
Increasingly researchers are focusing on co-design as a way of doing research, and therefore are developing parts of its research methodology. For instance, in the field of generative co-design Vandekerckhove et al. have proposed a methodology to assemble a group of stakeholders to participate in generative co-design activities in the early innovation process. They propose first to sample a group of potential stakeholders through snowball sampling, afterwards interview these people and assess their knowledge and inference experience, lastly they propose to assemble a diverse group of stakeholders according to their knowledge and inference experience.

Though not completely synonymous, research methods of Participatory Design can be defined under Participatory Research (PR): a term for research designs and frameworks using direct collaboration with those affected by the studied issue. More specifically, Participatory Design has evolved from Community-Based Research and Participatory Action Research (PAR). PAR is a qualitative research methodology involving: "three types of change, including critical consciousness development of researchers and participants, improvement of lives of those participating in research, and transformation of societal 'decolonizing' research methods with the power of healing and social justice". Participatory Action Research (PAR) is a subset of Community-Based Research aimed explicitly at including participants and empowering people to create measurable action. PAR practices across various disciplines, with research in Participatory Design being an application of its different qualitative methodologies. Just as PAR is often used in social sciences, for example, to investigate a person's lived experience concerning systemic structures and social power relations, Participatory Design seeks to deeply understand stakeholders' experiences by directly engaging them in the problem-defining and solving processes. Therefore, in Participatory Design, research methods extend beyond simple qualitative and quantitative data collection. Rather than being concentrated within data collection, research methods of Participatory Design are tools and techniques used throughout co-designing research questions, collecting, analyzing, and interpreting data, knowledge dissemination, and enacting change.

When facilitating research in Participatory Design, decisions are made in all research phases to assess what will produce genuine stakeholder participation. By doing so, one of Participatory Design's goals is to dismantle the power imbalance existing between 'designers' and 'users.' Applying PR and PAR research methods seeks to engage communities and question power hierarchies, which "makes us aware of the always contingent character of our presumptions and truths... truths are logical, contingent and intersubjective... not directed toward some specific and predetermined end goal... committed to denying us the (seeming) firmness of our commonsensical assumptions". Participatory design offers this denial of our "commonsensical assumptions" because it forces designers to consider knowledge beyond their craft and education. Therefore, a designer conducting research for Participatory Design assumes the role of facilitator and co-creator.

Other researchers suggest that participation in urban contexts is not merely a technical procedure initiated by experts or institutions, but rather a multifaceted and dynamic practice embedded in the transformation of cities. It encompasses not only planned participatory processes led by professionals—such as community planning or design workshops—but also grassroots and collective actions including self-building, urban gardening, occupation of vacant lots, street markets, protests, and dissident urban interventions. These practices are often rooted in ecological awareness, care, and a shared claim to the urban commons, as exemplified by initiatives like guerrilla gardening, tactical urbanism, and community-run spaces. Far from being marginal, these actions express citizens' direct engagement in shaping the city and reflect diverse motivations, ranging from ecological justice to cultural identity and social solidarity. Understood in this expanded sense, urban co-creation encompasses the full spectrum of participatory practices—whether formal, informal, or insurgent—that contribute to the collective making of urban space.

== Difficulties of adoption and involvement ==
Participatory Design is a growing practice within the field of design yet has not yet been widely implemented. Some barriers to the adoption of participatory design are listed below.

=== Doubt of universal creativity ===
A belief that creativity is a restricted skill would invalidate the proposal of participatory design to allow a wider reach of affected people to participate in the creative process of designing. However, this belief is based on a limited view of creativity which does not recognize that creativity can manifest in a wide range of activities and experiences. This doubt can be damaging not only to individuals but also to society as a whole. By assuming that only a select few possess creative talent, we may overlook the unique perspectives, ideas, and solutions.

=== Self-serving hierarchies ===
In a profit-motivated system, the commercial field of design may feel fearful of relinquishing some control in order to empower those who are typically not involved in the process of design. Commercial organizational structures often prioritize profit, individual gain, or status over the well-being of the community or other externalities. However, participatory practices are not impossible to implement in commercial settings. It may be difficult for those who have acquired success in a hierarchical structure to imagine alternative systems of open collaboration.

=== Lack of investment ===
Although participatory design has been of interest in design academia, applied uses require funding and dedication from many individuals. The high time and financial costs make research and development of participatory design less appealing for speculative investors. It also may be difficult to find or convince enough shareholders or community members to commit their time and effort to a project. However, widespread and involved participation is critical to the process.

Successful examples of participatory design are critical because they demonstrate the benefits of this approach and inspire others to adopt it. A lack of funding or interest can cause participatory projects to revert to practices where the designer initiates and dominates rather than facilitating design by the community.

=== Differing priorities between designers and participants ===
Participatory design projects which involve a professional designer as a facilitator to a larger group can have difficulty with competing objectives. Designers may prioritize aesthetics while end-users may prioritize functionality and affordability. Addressing these differing priorities may involve finding creative solutions that balance the needs of all stakeholders, such as using low-cost materials that meet functional requirements while also being aesthetically pleasing. Despite any potential predetermined assumptions, "the users' knowledge has to be considered as important as the knowledge of the other professionals in the team, [as this] can be an obstacle to the co-design practice." "[The future of] co-designing will be a close collaboration between all the stakeholders in the design development process together with a variety of professionals having hybrid design/research skills."

== See also ==
- Co-creation
- Computer-supported cooperative work
- Design thinking
- Participatory action research
- Permaculture
- Public participation
- Service design
- User innovation
- User participation in architecture (N.J. Habraken, Giancarlo De Carlo, and Structuralists such as Aldo van Eyck)

== Other sources ==
- Asaro, Peter M. (2000). Transforming society by transforming technology: the science and politics of participatory design. Accounting Management and Information Technology 10: 257–290.
- Button, G. and Sharrock, W. (1996). Project work: the organisation of collaborative design and development in software engineering. CSCW Journal, 5 (4), p. 369–386.
- Bødker, S. and Iversen, O.S. (2002): Staging a professional participatory design practice: moving PD beyond the initial fascination of user involvement. In Proceedings of the Second Nordic Conference on Human-Computer interaction (Aarhus, Denmark, October 19–23, (2002). NordiCHI '02, vol. 31. ACM Press, New York, 11–18
- Carr, A.A. (1997). User-design in the creation of human learning systems. Educational Technology Research and Development, 45 (3), 5–22.
- Carr-Chellman, A.A., Cuyar, C., & Breman, J. (1998). User-design: A case application in health care training. Educational Technology Research and Development, 46 (4), 97–114.
- Divitini, M. & Farshchian, B.A. 1999. Using Email and WWW in a Distributed Participatory Design Project. In SIGGROUP Bulletin 20(1), pp. 10–15.
- Ehn, P. & Kyng, M., 1991. Cardboard Computers: Mocking-it-up or Hands-on the Future. In, Greenbaum, J. & Kyng, M. (Eds.) Design at Work, pp. 169–196. Hillsdale, New Jersey: Laurence Erlbaum Associates.
- Grudin, J. (1993). Obstacles to Participatory Design in Large Product Development Organizations: In Namioka, A. & Schuler, D. (Eds.), Participatory design. Principles and practices (pp. 99–122). Hillsdale NJ: Lawrence Erlbaum Associates.
- Kensing, F. & Blomberg, J. 1998. Participatory Design: Issues and Concerns In Computer Supported Cooperative Work, Vol. 7, pp. 167–185.
- Kensing, F. 2003. Methods and Practices in Participatory Design. ITU Press, Copenhagen, Denmark.
- Kuiper, Gabrielle, June 2007, Participatory planning and design in the downtown eastside: reflections on Global Studio Vancouver, Australian Planner, v. 44, no. 2, pp. 52–53
- Kyng, M. (1989). Designing for a dollar a day. Office, Technology and People, 4(2): 157–170.
- Naghsh, A. M., Ozcan M. B. 2004. Gabbeh - A Tool For Computer Supported Collaboration in Electronic Paper-Prototyping. In *Dearden A & Watts L. (Eds). Proceedings of HCI "04: Design for Life volume 2. British HCI Group pp. 77–80
- Perry, M. & Sanderson, D. 1998. Coordinating Joint Design Work: The Role of Communication and Artefacts. Design Studies, Vol. 19, pp. 273–28.
- Press, Mandy, 2003. "Communities for Everyone: redesigning contested public places in Victoria", Chapter 9 of end Weeks et al. (eds), Community Practices in Australia (French Forests NSW: Pearson Sprint Print), pp. 59–65
- Sarkissian, W, Perglut, D. 1986, Community Participation in Practice, The Community Participation handbook, Second edition, Murdoch University
- Santa Rosa, J.G. & Moraes, A. 2012. Design Participativo: técnicas para inclusão de usuários no processo de ergodesign de interfaces. Rio de Janeiro: RioBooks.
- Schuler, D. & Namioka, A. (1993). Participatory design: Principles and practices. Hillsdale, NJ: Erlbaum.
- Wojahn, P. G., Neuwirth, C. M., Bullock, B. 1998. Effects of Interfaces for Annotation on Communication in a Collaborative Task. In Proceedings of CHI "98, LA, CA, April 18–23, ACM press: 456–463
