= Jonathan Lazar =

Jonathan Lazar is a professor in the College of Information Studies at the University of Maryland, where he is Executive Director of the Maryland Initiative for Digital Accessibility (MIDA), and is a core faculty member in the Human-Computer Interaction Lab (HCIL). He previously had been a professor at Towson University. At Towson University, he served as director of the Information Systems program for 14 years and also founded the Universal Usability Laboratory. He researches Human-Computer-Interaction, web accessibility for people with disabilities, user-centered design, and law and public policy related to HCI and accessibility. He is well-known for his work on accessibility for people who are blind.

== Education ==
He earned his LLM from the University of Pennsylvania Law School, his MS and PhD from University of Maryland Graduate School Baltimore (UMBC) and his BBA from Loyola University Maryland. He completed a Fellowship at the Harvard Radcliffe Institute.

== Career ==
He started his career as an assistant professor at Towson University, where he served as director of the Information Systems program and founded the Universal Usability Laboratory. He was promoted to the rank of Associate Professor and in 2009, the rank of Professor. In 2019, he joined the faculty of the University of Maryland at the Full Professor rank. He has also been an associate researcher at the Harvard Law School Project on Disability since 2013.

He is the author, co-author, or editor of 17 books, including the well-cited Research Methods in Human-Computer Interaction (2nd edition), Accessible Technology and the Developing World, Universal Usability: Designing Computer Interfaces for Diverse User Populations and Ensuring Digital Accessibility through Process and Policy.

== Awards ==
- In 2010, he was awarded the Dr. Jacob Bolotin Award by National Federation of the Blind.
- In 2016, he won the SIGCHI Social Impact Award by the Special Interest Group on Computer–Human Interaction
- In 2019, he won the Inaugural Rachel Olivero Accessibility Innovation Award
