= Ken Hinckley =

American computer scientist

- Born: 1969 (age 56–57)
- Education: Worcester Polytechnic Institute; University of Virginia
- Scientific career
- Fields: Computer science Human-computer interaction
- Workplaces: Worcester Polytechnic Institute; University of Virginia; Microsoft Research
- Doctoral advisor: Randy Pausch

Ken Hinckley (born 1969) is an American computer scientist and inventor. He is a senior principal research manager at Microsoft Research. He is known for his research in human-computer interaction, specifically on sensing techniques, pen computing, and cross-device interaction.

== Background ==
After received his bachelor's degree in computer science from Worcester Polytechnic Institute in 1991, Hinckley completed a master's degree in Computer Science (1993) and a Ph.D. in computer science from University of Virginia (1996), where he studied with advisor Randy Pausch.

Hinckley began working at Microsoft Research in 1997, where his primary research areas include novel input devices, device form-factors, and modalities of interaction. Hinckley has received numerous professional distinctions in the field of human-computer interaction. He has published over 80 academic papers in this field, and claims more than 150 patents. Hinckley is a member of the CHI Academy and has served as associate editor at ACM TOCHI (Transactions on Computer-Human Interaction) since 2003. His work has been cited more than 8000 times.

== Work ==
Hinckley has made notable contribution to the areas of human-computer modalities and their hardware design. His work spans numerous, often-overlapping topics, including bimanual interaction, sensing devices and techniques, pen and touch interaction, and cross-device interaction.

=== Bimanual interaction ===
In the 1990s, Hinckley studied bimanual interaction at the University of Virginia, often in collaboration with doctoral advisor Pausch. His work had applications in the field of neurosurgery, specifically, in neurosurgical medical imaging.

Hinckley's doctoral thesis, Haptic Issues for Virtual Manipulation (1997) investigated two-handed spatial interaction in user interfaces for applications in neurosurgical visualization. The paper presents two-handed virtual manipulation as an alternative interaction technique for the WIMP interface and investigates the role of passive haptic feedback in virtual manipulation. Hinckley's thesis work was conducted in collaboration with the Department of Neurosurgery at the University of Virginia.

Hinckley's research in bimanual interaction suggests that two-handed interfaces can offer cognitive advantages for the user, such as providing a perceptual frame of reference independent of visual feedback that single-handed interfaces lack.

=== Sensing techniques ===
At Microsoft Research, Hinckley has studied sensing techniques in interaction with mobile handheld devices. In Sensing Techniques for Mobile Interaction (2000), Hinckley and co-authors Jeff Pierce, Mike Sinclair, and Eric Horvitz integrated hardware sensors into a mobile device to enable functionalities such as automatically powering up when the user picks up the device and switching between portrait and landscape display modes when the device's physical orientation changes. Implementation of tilt, touch, and proximity sensors produced a context-sensitive interface that responded to the user and the environment. Hinckley's research introduced new modes of interaction for mobile device UI design. Hinckley and his colleagues were awarded the UIST 2000 Best Paper Award for Sensing Techniques for Mobile Interaction.

Sensor Synaesthesia: Touch in Motion, and Motion in Touch was published at CHI 2011. The work investigated multimodal input techniques on mobile handheld devices, specifically, how the combination of touch and motion sensing mutually enhanced, and enabled, synaesthetic techniques such as tilt-to-zoom and differentiating soft taps from hard taps. Hinckley and co-author Hyunyoung Song received the CHI 2011 Honorable Mention Award for their research.

=== Pen computing ===
Some of Hinckley's recent work in sensing includes Sensing Techniques for Stylus + Touch Interaction (2014). A study conducted by researchers at University of Manitoba, Cornell University, and Microsoft Research explored grip and motion sensing in pen and touch interaction. The study employed a number of tools that evaluate user grip and motion behaviors in order to contextualize usage patterns using stylus and tablet devices. For instance, the research demonstrated how tablet grip sensing techniques could be used as heuristics to detect unintentional thumb contact with the touch screen. The project was featured on Gizmodo and FastCo Design.

=== Microsoft Office Keyboard ===
As a member of the Microsoft Corporation Hardware Design Group, Hinckley served as a primary designer of the Microsoft Office Keyboard. The Microsoft Corporation Hardware Design Group was awarded the HFES (Human Factors and Ergonomics Society) User Centered Consumer Product Design Award by the HFES Consumer Product Technical Group.

== Notable honors and awards ==
- UIST (ACM Symposium on User Interface Software and Technology) 2000 Best Paper Award for Sensing Techniques for Mobile Interaction.
- UIST 2011 Lasting Impact Award for Sensing Techniques for Mobile Interaction (published in UIST 2000) for its "scientific exploration of mobile interaction, investigating new interaction techniques for handheld mobile devices supported by hardware sensors, and laying the groundwork for new research and industrial applications."
- UIST 2014 Best Paper Award for Sensing Techniques for Stylus + Touch Interaction.
- Hinckley was elected to the CHI Academy on April 27, 2014, in recognition for his research accomplishments and service to the ACM SIGCHI (Special Interest Group on Computer-Human Interaction) community.
