= ERCIM Cor Baayen Award =

Annual award for young researchers

The Cor Baayen Award is an annual award given to a promising young researcher in computer science and applied mathematics. In 1995, the award was created to honor the first ERCIM (European Research Consortium for Informatics and Mathematics) president.

As a young researcher award, nominees must have obtained their PhD in the three years before the yearly nomination deadline. A researcher can be nominated for the award only once. The award is presented as a check for 5000 Euro and a certificate. The awardee is then invited to ERCIM meetings the following autumn. An article is published in ERCIM news with the name of the winner, and all nominees of the year.

Recipients of Cor Baayen Award
Year	Recipient	Presenting Institution
2024	Nicola Messina	CNR
2023	Rianne de Heide	CWI
2022	Fabio Carrara	CNR
2021	Tomasz Kociumaka	University of Warsaw
2020	Stefano Cresci	CNR
2019	Ninon Burgos	INRIA
2019	András Gilyén	CWI
2018	Martina Lindorfer	SBA
2017	Tim Baarslag	CWI
2016	Michał Pilipczuk	University of Warsaw
2015	Zuzana Kukelova	CRCIM
2014	Juan Reutter	University of Warsaw
2013	Julien Mairal	INRIA
2012	Paweł Parys	PLERCIM
2011	Stratos Idreos	CWI
2011	Luca Mottola	SICS
2010	Andrea Esuli	CNR
2009	Teemu Roos	VTT
2008	Adam Dunkels	SICS
2007	Boris Motik	STFC
2006	Oliver Heckmann	Fraunhofer-Gesellschaft
2005	Milan Vojnovic	CCLRC
2004	Christof Teuscher	SARIT
2003	Ronald de Wolf	CWI
2002	Andreas Rauber	AARIT
2001	Phong Q. Nguyen	INRIA
2000	Philippe Baptiste	INRIA
1999	Mikael Degermark	SICS
1998	Matthias Grossglauser	INRIA
1997	Kristina Höök	SICS
1996	Dimitris Papadias	GMD
1995	Christer Samuelsson	SICS

== See also ==
- List of computer science awards
- List of mathematics awards
