= Feminist HCI =

Subfield of human–computer interaction

Feminist HCI is a subfield of human–computer interaction (HCI) that applies feminist theory, critical theory and philosophy to social topics in HCI, including scientific objectivity, ethical values, data collection, data interpretation, reflexivity, and unintended consequences of HCI software. The term was originally used in 2010 by Shaowen Bardzell, and although the concept and original publication are widely cited, as of 2020 Bardzell's proposed frameworks have been rarely used since.

== History ==
In the early 1980s, there was optimism as to how the field of cognitive psychology could contribute to the development of the field of HCI. As computer systems at the time were widely regarded as difficult to learn and use, mainstream information processing theories and models in psychology were used as a basis from which to develop design principles, methods, analytic tools and prescriptive advice for the design of computer interfaces. This was done generally by three methods: basic research, cognitive modeling and science communication.

One such contribution to the development of HCI in the 90s was by John M. Carroll in 1991, who described in detail how scientific principles were applied to HCI experimental design. Carroll writes that at the time, the 50-year struggle to establish psychology as a science was an important factor in trying to apply the scientific method to HCI studies. Through the 1970s, the typical measures used by empirical studies for HCI were relatively simple; error frequencies and performance times such as by using or testing Fitt's law. However, these scientifically minded studies did not produce insight into improving programming. It was not well understood at the time, how to use structured programming to make higher code quality that is more reliable and maintainable.

The term gender HCI was first described in 2006, and its development is related to feminist HCI. Gender HCI by comparison, examines the functional differences between females and males in using specific computing software such as Excel, whereas feminist HCI applies social principles to the techniques used in HCI design. While it was not disputed there were significant gender gaps in technology participation, there was academic disagreement about the importance or relevance of gender in HCI design in the 2000s. Feminist HCI was also influenced by science and technology studies research.

The term feminist HCI was first used in a 2010 paper by Shaowen Bardzell's article titled Feminist HCI: Taking Stock and Outlining an Agenda for Design. It was one of the first papers at the time to propose adoption of feminist theories into HCI research and practice. It was followed up with a second publication in 2011 detailing the historical interaction between social science and feminism, and how this relates to HCI.

According to a 2020 study of 70 papers using the term and citing Bardzell's original paper, it was found that Bardzell's proposed frameworks have been widely cited but rarely used and in practice only amount to a superficial engagement with feminist theory.

== Original theory ==
Bardzell's original theory first examines the history of feminist standpoint theory, science and technology studies, and Bardzell describes how they want the epistemology of HCI to change to better align with feminist standpoint theory. Bardzell considers principles including equity, diversity, social justice, and the already existing theories on gender HCI. This is followed by a literature review of how feminism has been applied to similar fields, including product design, architecture, urban planning and game design. The main proposal of the theory is using six core qualities in HCI design:

- Pluralism: Building on feminist standpoint theory, this quality argues that human experience and culture is too varied to be captured within the universalism of one single technology or framework. This principle suggests that heterogeneous HCI design is important to not erase cultures. Bardzell gives an example of how a particular Western washing machine brand imported to India was poorly designed to operate with indian clothes and damaged them.
- Participation: Users of technology are typically viewed in HCI as subjects rather than on an equal level with the designers. Bardzell suggests having users be contribute design process (e.g. through participatory design). She argues that this work should occur alongside traditional usability testing.
- Advocacy: Bardzell states there is a conflict between preserving the status quo of existing software in order for it to be familiar to users but with less features, and changing software which may impose developer values onto users. She suggests that users should be able to advocate for desired software through customisability options.
- Ecology: Bardzell suggests examining the reflexive effects of HCI on larger social structures and ecosystems. For example, the way a house is designed has an impact on structuring the lives of people who live in it (see feminism and modern architecture for additional information).
- Embodiment: A significant part of HCI research at the time in experimental design generally involved isolating single ('disembodied') factors and studying them separately within their own model, such as a mental model, or within information processing theory. Bardzell instead suggests a more holistic approach, such as by involving emotion, fun, spirituality, food, sexuality, and whole-body interactions as experimental elements, especially in gender HCI studies.
- Self-disclosure: Bardzell asserts that typical HCI design involves making assumptions about the 'ideal' user for a website for a human–computer interface, and that this necessarily discriminates based on how similar any particular user is to this image of the ideal user. In turn, she states how software imposes this expectation of an intended or correct method on the user, expecting the users to change in order to use the software effectively. For example, she considers that the data collection practices of Amazon are used for targeted advertising, which in turn affects what media a user may see or purchase on the website, and over time this may change how the user behaves when using Amazon or in general. She believes that this effect is harmful and that a way to mitigate this harm is to give the users options to manually change or 'disclose' media recommendation preferences.

== Examples ==
Examples of research utilizing feminist HCI include:

- A 2012 case study by Jill Dimond et al. on how a non-profit activist organisation Hollaback! used use feminist HCI principles in computer-supported cooperative work systems design, and how this affected site use.
- A 2016 paper by Catherine D'Ignazio using consumer participation, advocacy, and ecology to improve breast pump technologies.
- A 2016 case study by Casey Fiesler et al. about how an online fan fiction community, consisting mostly of women, designed an accessible website for Archive of Our Own.

== Related theory ==
For comparison, design theory that does not reference or use the term HCI can also involve feminist perspectives in design, such as:

- Ecological emphasis on human life and prosperity over output and growth
- Following best practices in labor/ international production /trade
- Engaging in non-hierarchical/ interdisciplinary/ collaborative work
- Addressing user needs at multiple levels, including support for pleasure/ fun/ happiness
- Creating thoughtful products for female users

== See also ==
- Topics in human–computer interaction
- Data feminism
- Feminist technoscience
- Interaction design
- Usability
