= ACM Interactions =

Academic magazine

ACM Interactions magazine is a publication covering a number of related worlds, offering content to educate and inspire designers, providing viewpoints related to culture and anthropology, describing innovation and creation in a business environment, and continually investigating the relationship between people, experiences, and technology. Its publisher is the Association for Computing Machinery (ACM), which has its headquarters in New York City.

== Bibliometrics ==
As of December 28, 2016:

- Citation Count: 6,906
- Downloads (cumulative): 1,404,167
- Downloads (12 Months): 98,227
- Downloads (6 Weeks): 12,567

== History ==
First published in 1994, Interactions initially appeared quarterly, and moved to bi-monthly in 1996. Since 2000, SIGCHI – ACM's Special Interest Group on Computer Human Interaction – has included a subscription to Interactions among its benefits of membership.

Interactions is the third largest ACM publication, and receives the second most citations, according to an article by new editors Wakkary and Stolterman in SIGCHI 2011.

== Structure ==
Each issue contains a cover story, regarded as the keynote article. Forums are published three times a year by specific Forum Editors, contributing a perspective such as sustainability or public policy. Blogspots are opinionated personal pieces, The Demo Hour segments represent a glimpse at a specific project, and Day in the Lab articles feature labs across the globe.

Finally, the majority of each issue is contained in (typically) 5-6 feature articles, describing issues of general importance to the HCI community.

== Editors ==
- 1994–1995 John Rheinfrank and Bill Hefley
- 1996 John Rheinfrank
- 1997–1998 Vacant
- 1998–2004 Steven Pemberton
- 2005–2007 Jonathan Arnowitz and Elizabeth Dykstra-Erickson
- 2008–2010 Richard Anderson and Jon Kolko
- 2011–2016 Ron Wakkary and Erik Stolterman
- 2016–2019 Simone Barbosa and Gilbert Cockton
- 2019–2023 Daniela Rosner, Alex Taylor, and Mikael Wiberg
- 2023–2026 Elizabeth Churchill and Mikael Wiberg
