= Steven Pemberton =

British-Dutch computer scientist

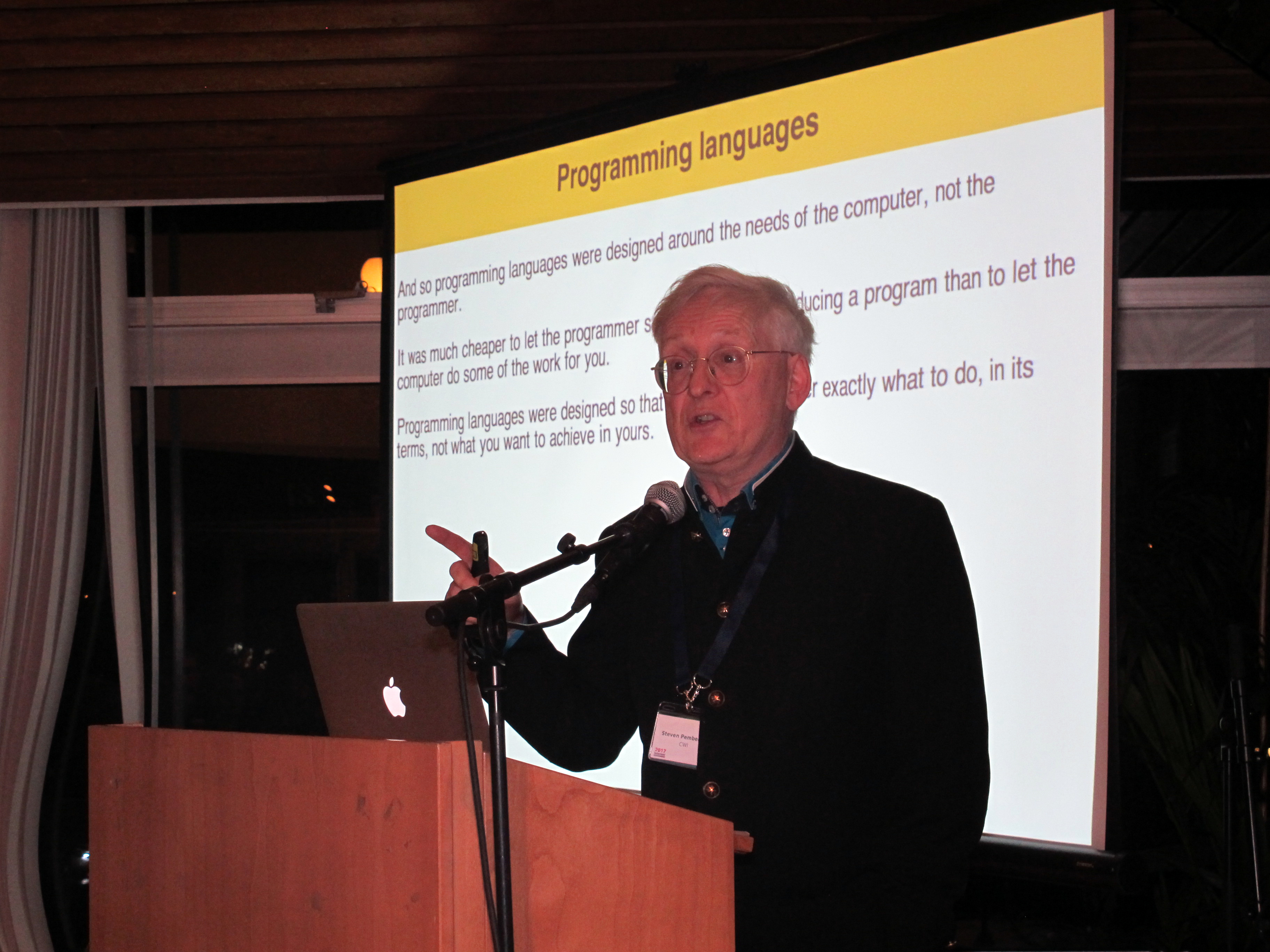
Steven Pemberton

Steven Pemberton is a researcher affiliated with the Distributed and Interactive Systems group at the Centrum Wiskunde & Informatica (CWI), the national research institute for mathematics and computer science in the Netherlands.

He was one of the designers of ABC, a programming language released in 1987, and editor-in-chief of the Special Interest Group on Computer–Human Interaction (SIGCHI)'s Bulletin from 1993-1999 and the Association for Computing Machinery (ACM)'s Interactions from 1998-2004.

== Contributions to web standards ==
Pemberton was a contributing author of HyperText Markup Language (HTML) 4.0 and HTML 4.01, and chair of the World Wide Web Consortium (W3C) HTML Working Group. He was a contributing author of the Extensible HyperText Markup Language (XHTML) specifications 1.0 in 2000 and 1.1 in 2001, and chair of the XHTML 2 Working Group from 2006-9.

He chaired the first W3C workshop on style sheets in 1995, and was a contributing author of the Cascading Style Sheets (CSS) Level 1 specification in 1996, Level 2 in 1998, and CSS Color Module Level 3 in 2002.

Pemberton was co-chair of the W3C XForms Working Group from 2000-2007, and in 2003 co-authored the XForms 1.0 specification. In 2009 he co-authored the XForms 1.1 and XML Events specifications. He was co-chair of the W3C Forms Working Group from 2010-2012.

== Awards ==
- 2009: SIGCHI Lifetime Service Award.
- 2022: SIGCHI Lifetime Practice Award.
