= Kristina Höök =

Swedish computer scientist (born 1964)

Kristina Höök (born 1964) is a Swedish computer scientist specializing in human–computer interaction and known for her work in somaesthetics. She is a professor in interaction design at the KTH Royal Institute of Technology.

== Education and career ==
Höök earned a bachelor's degree in 1987 from Uppsala University, completed a Ph.D. in 1996 at Stockholm University, and earned a habilitation in 2002 from Stockholm University.

She has been a researcher for the Research Institutes of Sweden (RISE) since 1990, and became a professor at Stockholm University in 2003. She moved to KTH in 2012.

She served as the Editor-in-chief of the ACM Transactions on Computer-Human Interaction from 2018 until 2024.

== Books ==
Höök is the author of the book Designing with the Body: Somaesthetic Interaction Design, published in 2018 by the MIT Press.

Her edited volumes include Designing Information Spaces: The Social Navigation Approach (with David Benyon and Alan J. Munro, Springer, 2003) and Social Navigation of Information Space (with Munro and Benyon, Springer, 1999).

== Recognition ==
Höök was the 1997 winner of the ERCIM Cor Baayen Award. In 2005, she was named to the Royal Swedish Academy of Engineering Sciences. In 2020 she was elected to the CHI Academy. In 2022, Höök received an honorary doctorate from the University of Gothenburg's IT Faculty. In 2025, SIGCHI awarded Höök the Lifetime Service Award.
