= Susan M. Dray =

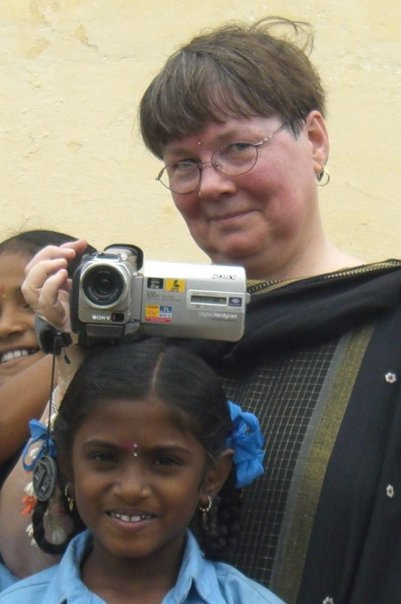
- Susan M. Dray conducting ethnography in India
- Born: New Jersey, US
- Education: Mills College, University of California, Los Angeles
- Known for: Human-Computer Interaction, Ethnography
- Awards: ACM Fellow, Human Factors and Ergonomics Society Fellow, SIGCHI Lifetime Achievement in Practice Award, UXPA Lifetime Achievement Award
- Scientific career
- Fields: Computer Science
- Workplaces: Dray & Associates

Susan M. Dray is an American human-computer interaction (HCI) and user experience (UX) professional who is a member of the CHI academy and the User Experience Professionals Association (UXPA). Dray is known for her work in the field of UX design and is also a founding member of SIGCHI, the Association for Computing Machinery's special interest group for human-computer interaction.

== Education ==
Dray earned a Bachelor of Arts in Psychology from Mills College in Oakland, California in 1972. She then went on to pursue her master's degree and PhD in Psychology from the University of California, Los Angeles.

== Career ==
Dray's career in industrial research began in 1979 at Honeywell, where she became manager of human-technology impacts and also a senior research scientist. Later, she worked at American Express, and became the first to develop a usability lab of corporate systems in the industry.

In 2014, Dray went to Universidad Tecnológica de Panamá (UTP) in Panama City as a Fulbright Scholar to develop and enrich an HCI program for the university.

Dray currently serves as the president emerita of Dray & Associates, which is a small user experience consulting firm where she leads a team that plans and carries out user experience and design research on their clients' main products. She started the company in 1993.

== Awards and recognition ==
Dray has won numerous awards over the course of her career, most notably her Lifetime achievement in practice award in 2015, the highest award given by SIGCHI. Dray also received another Lifetime Service Award from SIGCHI in 2006. She is also recognized by the UXPA who awarded her the Lifetime Achievement Award in 2016.

In 2017, she became an ACM Fellow "for co-founding ACM SIGCHI and disseminating exemplary user experience design and evaluation practices worldwide." In addition, she is a Fellow of the Human Factors and Ergonomics Society.
