= Austin Center for Design =

Design school in Austin, Texas

Coordinates: 30.276129°N 97.716059°W

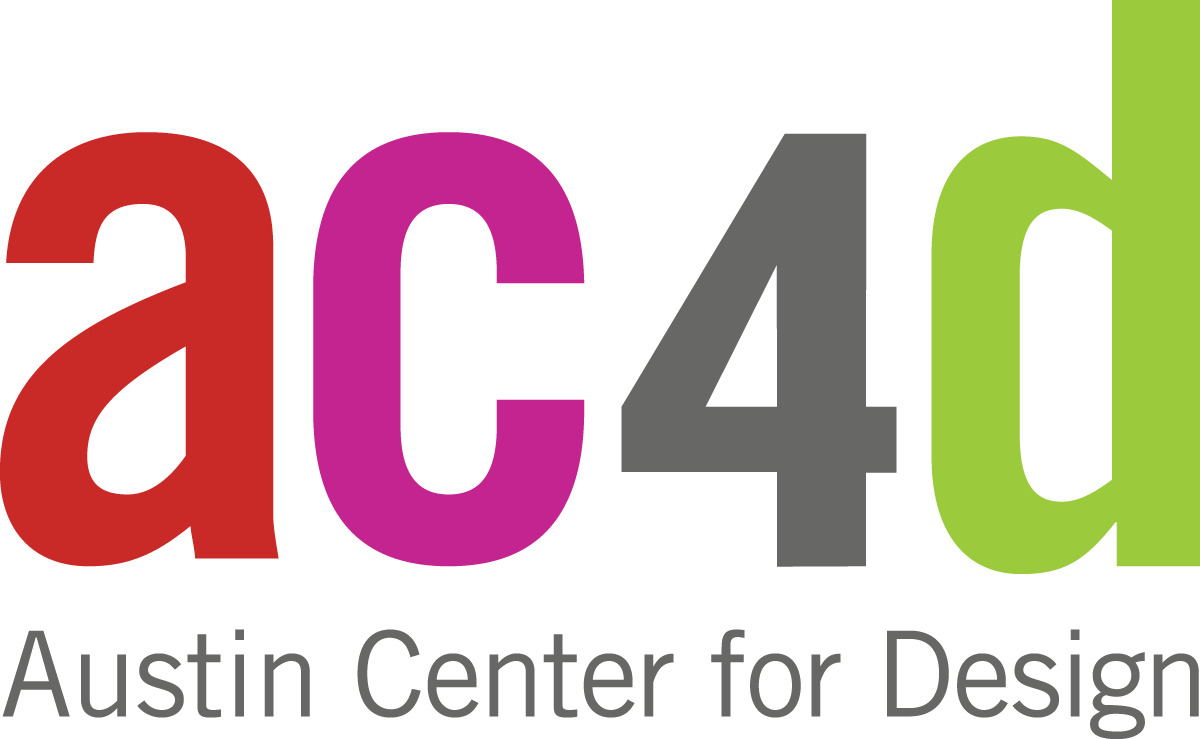
- Type: Private
- Established: 2010
- Director: Maryanne Lee
- Location: Austin, TX, USA
- Website: http://www.austincenterfordesign.com/

Austin Center for Design (abbreviated AC4D) is an educational institution in Austin, Texas that offers a curriculum in interaction design and social entrepreneurship. Started by Jon Kolko, AC4D opened its doors to its first class in August 2010.

The stated mission of AC4D is to "transform society through design and design education. This transformation occurs through the development of design knowledge directed towards all forms of social and humanitarian problems."

AC4D offers a one year program in interaction design and social entrepreneurship, and 10-day programs for executive education.

== Curriculum ==
Interaction Design Research and Synthesis focuses on methods of qualitative design research and design synthesis used to approach complicated problems of technology, behavior and society.

Design Society and the Public Sector emphasizes the theoretical, social and political relationships between design and the culture of society.

Rapid Ideation and Creative Problem Solving teaches methods of creative problem solving and ideation, including sketching, drawing, diagramming, and the underlying approaches of abductive thinking and divergent thinking.

Service Design introduces the advanced design topic of service design, with a focus and emphasis on the service design blueprint.

Evaluation of Interaction Design Solutions teaches methods of evaluation and testing that allow for a thorough analysis of a design in an attempt to positively refine that design.

Theory of Interaction Design and Social Entrepreneurship teaches advanced theory of interaction design, specifically as related to dialogue, discourse, semantics, experience, and communication.

Entrepreneurial Practice describes the financial models and structures of business, as related to launching a particular design product, service or system.

Design for Impact: 32 Week Studio teaches the fundamental methods and processes needed to conceptualize, communicate and sell ideas in today's business environment.

== Director ==
Maryanne Lee is the Director of Austin Center for Design.

== Founder ==
Jon Kolko is the Founder of Austin Center for Design.
