= Loren Terveen =

American computer scientist

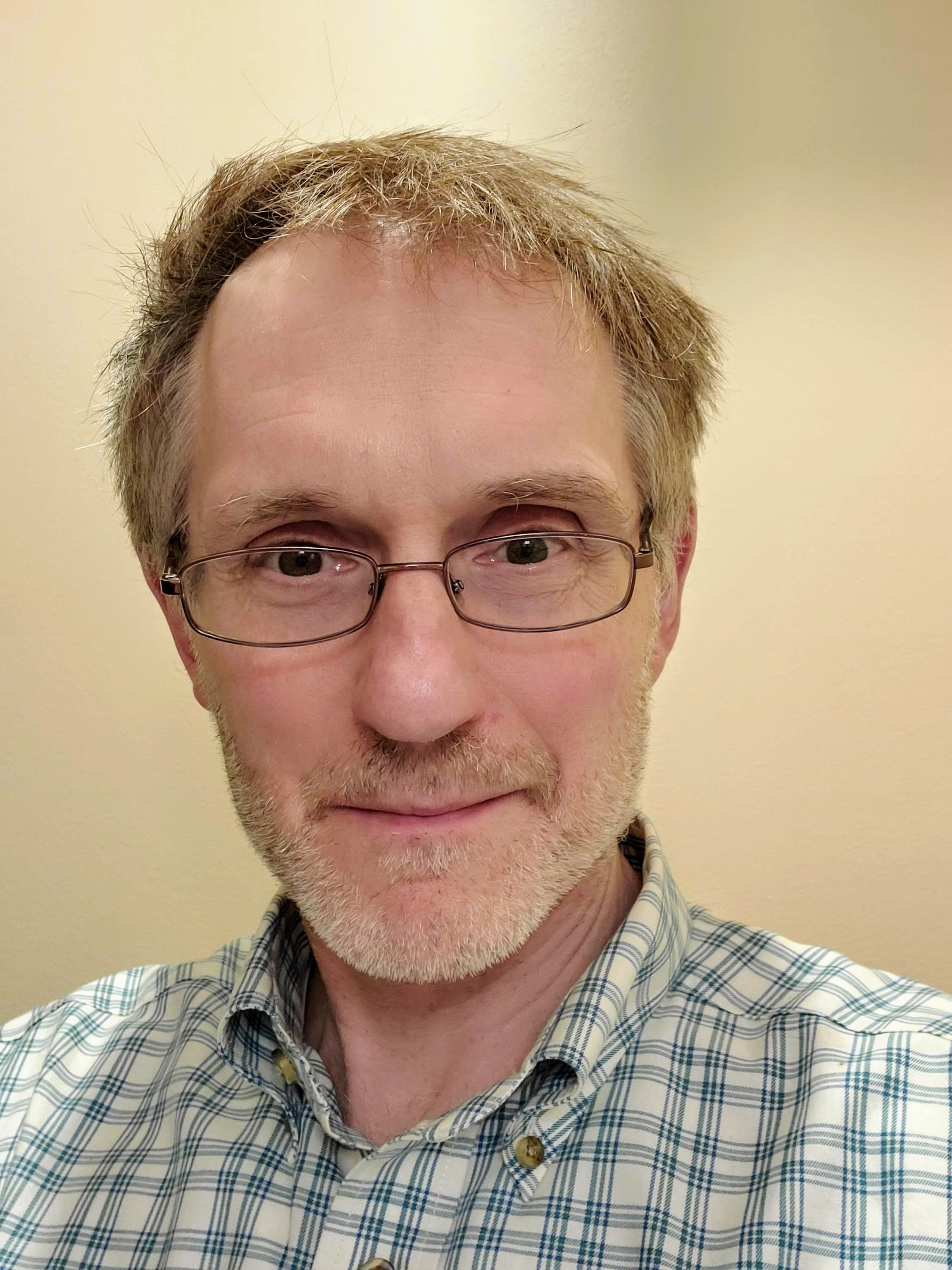
- Loren Terveen in 2019
- Citizenship: United States
- Awards: ACM Distinguished Member
- Scientific career
- Fields: Computer science, human-computer interaction
- Workplaces: University of Minnesota

Loren Terveen is an American computer scientist and was the president of the Association for Computing Machinery's SIGCHI professional group from 2015 to 2018. Terveen is a professor of computer science and engineering and studies human-computer interaction at GroupLens Research at the University of Minnesota. Since 2025, he has served as the head of the Computer Science department.

In 2008, Terveen and colleagues created Cyclopath, a path recommender system for cyclists in Minneapolis-Saint Paul, Minnesota. Terveen co-authored the article "Evaluating collaborative filtering recommender systems", which has been cited over eight thousand times in scientific research.

In 2009, he was elected an ACM Distinguished Member.

In 2023, Terveen received SIGCHI's Lifetime Service Award.

Terveen's family is from Emery, South Dakota. He now lives in Minneapolis, Minnesota.
