= Jon Kolko =

American interaction designer (born 1978)

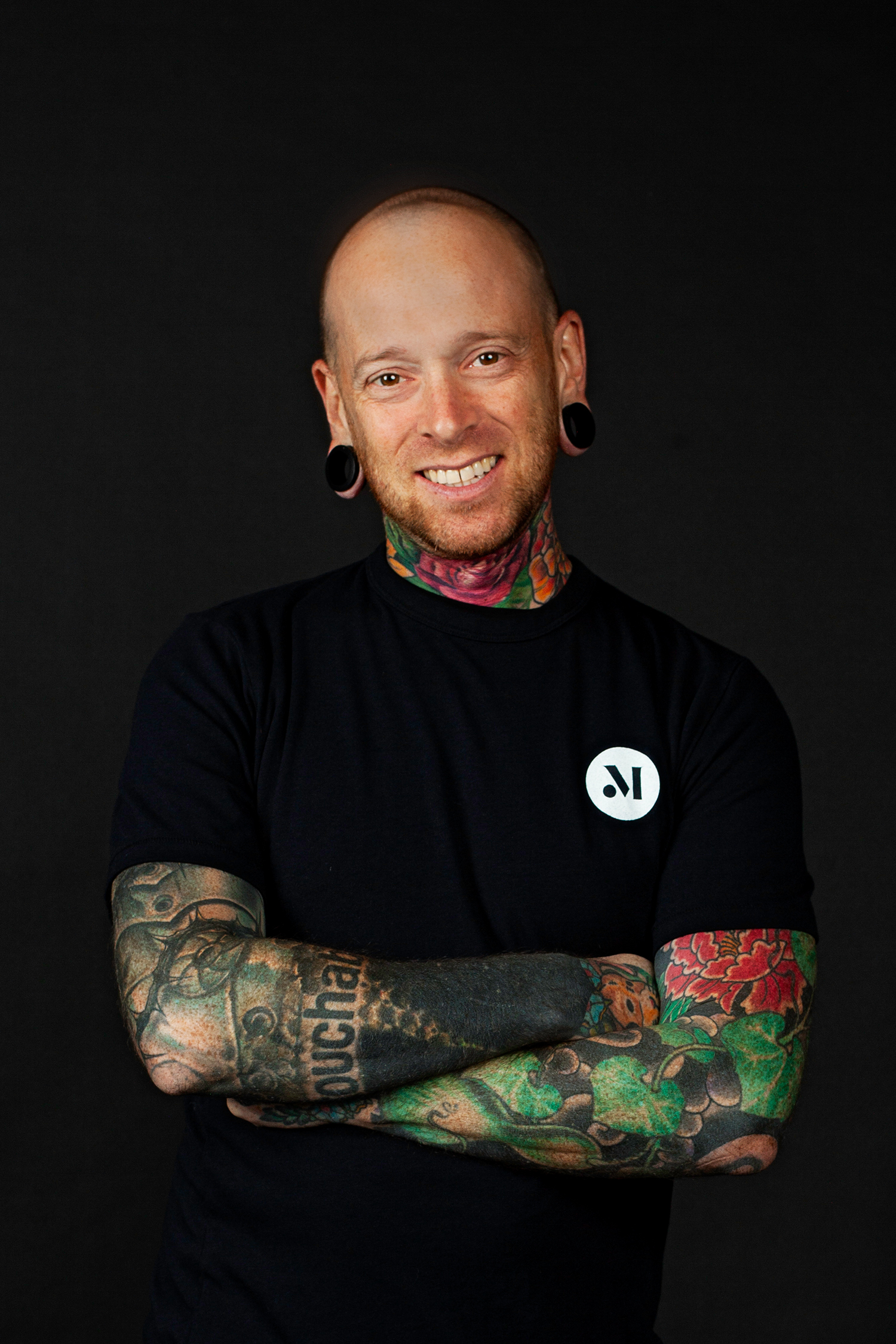
- Jon Kolko
- Born: 1978 (age 47–48); Rochester, NY
- Citizenship: United States
- Education: Carnegie Mellon University
- Occupations: Designer and Author
- Spouse: Jess Kolko
- Writing career
- Language: English
- Genre: Non-fiction
- Subject: Design
- Notable works: Creative Clarity; How I Teach; Well-Designed; Exposing the Magic of Design; Wicked Problems; Thoughts on Interaction Design;
- Website: Official website

Jon Kolko is the founder of Austin Center for Design, a progressive educational institution teaching interaction design and social entrepreneurship. He was also a partner at Modernist Studio, and is now a partner at Narrative.

Kolko has held the positions of Vice President of Design at Blackboard and at MyEdu; Executive Director of Design Strategy at Thinktiv, a startup accelerator in Austin, Texas; and both Principal Designer and Associate Creative Director roles at frog design, a global innovation firm. He was also a professor of interaction and industrial design at the Savannah College of Art and Design. Kolko has also held the role of Director for the Interaction Design Association (IxDA), and Editor-in-Chief of Interactions magazine, published by the ACM.

Kolko is the author of the following books:

- Thoughts on Interaction Design (Brown Bear Press, 2007; Morgan Kaufmann, 2011)
- Exposing the Magic of Design: A Practitioner's Guide to the Methods and Theory of Synthesis (Oxford University Press, 2011)
- Wicked Problems: Problems Worth Solving (Austin Center for Design, 2012)
- Well Designed: How to Use Empathy to Create Products People Love (Harvard Business Review Press, 2014)
- How I Teach (Brown Bear Press, 2017)
- Creative Clarity: A Practical Guide For Bringing Creative Thinking Into Your Company (Brown Bear Press, 2017)
- This Chainsaw Cannot Fly: The power of storytelling to shape and drive product roadmaps (Brown Bear Press, 2022)
- Cashing Out: A handbook for selling your creative services company, and a million reasons not to do it (Narrative, 2023)
