= Shaowen Bardzell =

Taiwanese-American computer scientist

Shaowen Bardzell is a Taiwanese-American computer scientist who is a professor at the Georgia Institute of Technology College of Computing, where she is the chair of the School of Interactive Computing. Her research focuses on humanistic informatics, feminist approaches to human–computer interaction, and sustainable design.

== Education and career ==
Bardzell earned a bachelor's degree in foreign languages and literatures at Tunghai University in Taiwan in 1991, and then went to Indiana University Bloomington for graduate study in comparative literature. She received a master's degree in 1994 and completed her Ph.D. in 2004, with the dissertation Hospitality and Gift Exchange: Reciprocity and Its Roles in Two Medieval Narratives.

After continuing at Indiana University Bloomington as a visiting assistant professor in the School of Public Health, she took a position as an assistant professor in the School of Informatics and Computing of Indiana University–Purdue University Indianapolis in 2007. She returned to Indiana University Bloomington as an assistant professor in the School of Informatics and Computing in 2008, and was promoted to associate professor in 2013.

She moved to the Pennsylvania State University College of Information Sciences and Technology in 2020. In 2023 she moved again to her present position at Georgia Tech. She took over the department chair previously held by Ayanna Howard, who became dean of engineering at Ohio State University.

Along with her appointment as the new chair of Georgia Tech's School of Interactive Computing Bardzell brought her Cultural Research in Technology (CRIT) Lab to Georgia Tech from her previous position at Penn State. Citing her interests in diversity and interdisciplinary studies, Bardzell brought this lab to Georgia Tech to encourage students and colleagues to integrate a humanistic approach into technological developments. This lab is grounded in HCI methodologies and analyzes how interactive technologies impact sociocultural and political issues important to today. This is achieved by blending qualitative methodologies from critical studies such as ethnography and social critique theories (EX: Feminism or Marxism) and applying quantitative methodologies, such as procedural lab experiments. The CRIT Lab's work has been funded by major foundations, including the Intel Corporation, the National Science Foundation, and the Chiang Ching-Kuo Foundation.

== Notable work ==
In 2010, Bardzell introduced the term Feminist HCI in her paper “Feminist HCI: Taking Stock and Outlining an Agenda for Design” by combining ideas from feminist theory with Human-Computer Interactions (HCI) principles. Bardzell’s paper proposed six key qualities of Feminist HCI: pluralism, self-disclosure, participation, embodiment, advocacy, and ecology. While the original “Feminist HCI” paper has been widely cited, according to a 2020 study, the citations have rarely resulted in the practical use of Bardzell’s Feminist HCI principles.

== Recognition ==
Bardzell received the SIGCHI Societal Impact Award in 2023. The following year, she was named to the CHI Academy and in 2025, was recognized as an ACM Distinguished Member. Her writing has been widely acclaimed, receiving more than 14 best paper awards and honorable mentions at conferences hosted by the Special Interest Group on Computer-Human Interactions (SIGCHI) and iSchools Inc.

In addition to the above recognition of her research, Bardzell has been the recipient of several awards highlighting her dedication to teaching. Indiana University awarded Bardzell with the Women in Computing Graduate Faculty of the Year Award in 2010, and Trustees Teaching Award in 2014. She was nominated for the Inspirational Teacher Award in 2011 and 2013.

== Books ==
Bardzell is the coauthor of books including:

- Mastering Macromedia Contribute (with Jeffrey Bardzell, 2003)
- Macromedia Studio 8 (with Jeffrey Bardzell, Adobe Systems 2006)
- Humanistic HCI (with Jeffrey Bardzell, Morgan and Claypool, 2015)

Her edited volumes include:

- Critical Theory and Interaction Design (with Jeffrey Bardzell and Mark Blythe, MIT Press, 2018).
