= Nicola Dell =

Zimbabwe-born computer scientist

- Born: 1981 or 1982; Zimbabwe
- Education: University of East Anglia (BSc); University of Washington (MS, PhD)
- Awards: MacArthur Fellowship
- Scientific career
- Fields: Computer science
- Institutions: Cornell Tech
- Thesis: Mobile Camera-Based Systems for Low-Resource Environments

Nicola Dell (born 1981 or 1982) is a Zimbabwe-born computer scientist. She is an associate professor at Cornell Tech and in the information sciences department at Cornell University. Dell researches human–computer interaction with reference to survivors of intimate partner violence. In 2024, she was named a MacArthur Fellow.

== Biography ==
Dell was born in Zimbabwe. In 2004, she graduated from the University of East Anglia with a B.Sc. in computer science. She later studied computer science and engineering at the University of Washington, receiving an MS in 2011 and a PhD in 2015. She joined the faculty of Cornell Tech in 2016.

== Selected publications ==
- Freed, D., Palmer, J., Minchala, D., Levy, K., Ristenpart, T., & Dell, N. (2018). “A Stalker’s Paradise”: How Intimate Partner Abusers Exploit Technology. Proceedings of the 2018 CHI Conference on Human Factors in Computing Systems, 1–13. https://doi.org/10.1145/3173574.3174241
- Sterling, M. R., Tseng, E., Poon, A., Cho, J., Avgar, A. C., Kern, L. M., Ankuda, C. K., & Dell, N. (2020). Experiences of Home Health Care Workers in New York City During the Coronavirus Disease 2019 Pandemic: A Qualitative Analysis. JAMA Internal Medicine, 180(11), 1453. https://doi.org/10.1001/jamainternmed.2020.3930
