= Lorraine Borman =

American computer scientist

- Citizenship: American
- Education: M.A. History, Northwestern University 1971; Ph.B. Northwestern University 1969
- Known for: Human-Computer Interaction
- Awards: SIGCHI Lifetime Service Award; Outstanding Contribution to ACM Award
- Scientific career
- Fields: computer science
- Workplaces: Northwestern University

Lorraine Borman is an American computer scientist associated with Northwestern University who specializes in information retrieval, computational social science, and human–computer interaction. She was one of the founders of SIGCHI, the Special Interest Group on Computer–Human Interaction of the Association for Computing Machinery, and became its first chair.

== Background ==
In the late 1960s and early 1970s, Borman worked at the Vogelback Computing Center of Northwestern University, where she published several works in information retrieval and computational social science. By 1977, she was editor of the Bulletin of the ACM Special Interest Group on the Social and Behavioral Science of Computing (SIGSOC), and in that role traveled to China with a group of Northwestern faculty and toured the computing facilities there.

== Founding SIGCHI ==
Beginning in 1978, she and SIGSOC chair Greg Marks began talking about refocusing SIGSOC, because by then the use of computers in the social sciences had become more mainstream, making it possible for SIGSOC's core constituency of social scientists to interact through social science societies instead of through the ACM. Borman and Marks found their new focus in human–computer interaction; Borman chaired a panel on this topic at an ACM Conference in 1978, and was the proceedings editor of a SIGSOC conference in 1981 centered on the topic. By 1982, they had persuaded the ACM to rename SIGSOC to SIGCHI. Borman became the first chair of the new SIG, and remained chair for six years.

== Awards and honors ==
In 1992, the ACM gave Borman their Outstanding Contribution to ACM Award and in 1994 they elected her as an ACM Fellow "for her diligent work and commitment to the development and growth of SIGCHI and for her creative spark and skilled workmanship which guided the research and publication of the DataPlan Committee reports." In 2003 she was given the SIGCHI Lifetime Service Award.
