= Gary Olson (political scientist) =

American political scientist

Gary L. Olson is professor emeritus of political science at Moravian College in Bethlehem, Pennsylvania, United States. He is the author of: Empathy Imperiled: Capitalism, Culture, and the Brain; How the World Works; U.S. Foreign Policy and the Third World Peasant; and The Other Europe. He has written over 75 published articles and op-eds, many for ZNet. His research areas include international political economy, identity politics and global labor issues. During the 1980s, he sponsored several trips to the Soviet Union with his students from Moravian College.

He was also very active during the late 1990s with the Labor Party, nationally and in the Lehigh Valley, Pennsylvania.

Gary Olson is the father of award-winning spoken word/folk poet Alix Olson.

== Education ==
- B.A., Concordia College, Moorhead
- M.A., University of South Dakota
- Ph.D., University of Colorado

== Awards and fellowships ==
Fulbright and Malone Fellowships: Finland, Egypt, Syria, [Palestine] Kuwait, Jordan, Israel, and Mexico

Lindback Award for Distinguished Teaching (1979) NIH Fellow (UNC - Chapel Hill) NEH Summer Fellowships (1979, 1982, 1989, 1991, 1995)
