= Gary M. Olson =

- Born: December 24, 1944 (age 81); Los Angeles, California
- Education: Stanford University
- Known for: Human-computer interaction Computer supported cooperative work

Gary M. Olson (born 24 December 1944) is an American professor and researcher, specializing in the fields of human-computer interaction and computer supported cooperative work. He has published over 120 research articles and book chapters, and is one of the authors of Working Together Apart: Collaboration over the Internet (Morgan & Claypool, 2014).

== Education ==
Olson received his B.A. in psychology from the University of Minnesota in 1967. He received his M.A. in 1968 and Ph.D. in 1970, both in psychology from Stanford University.

== Career and research ==
Olson became an assistant professor of psychology at the University of Michigan in 1975, was promoted to associate professor in 1977, and professor in 1984. He first became interested in human-computer interaction in the early 1980s, and played a large part in developing the human-computer interaction program at the University of Michigan. He joined the School of Information as a professor and associate dean for research in 1995, and was named the Paul M. Fitts Collegiate Professor of Human-Computer Interaction in 2001, which was his position until 2008, when he became the Donald Bren Professor of Information and Computer Sciences at the University of California, Irvine.

Olson has placed a focus on collaborative technologies and long-distance work throughout his career. In 2000, Olson and his wife Judith S. Olson published the notable and highly cited paper "Distance Matters", that reviews over a decade of research on collaborative technologies for remote work, details some of the challenges of long-distance collaborative work through the technologies found in these studies, and provides potential ways to maximize the chance of succeeding at remote work. Olson has also published several edited books, most notably Scientific collaboration on the Internet (MIT Press, 2008) which includes chapters from several experts in the field of internet collaboration, as well as several case studies of large-scale collaborative projects. In 2014, Olson and his wife Judith S. Olson published their coauthored book Working Together Apart: Collaboration over the Internet (Morgan & Claypool, 2014), which is a review of their research on technology used for long distance collaboration.

In 2015, Olson was a member of a team that published a research paper on a tool called DocuViz, which visualizes the revision history of Google Docs, Sheets, and Slides documents. The team analyzed over 100 documents using the tool, finding patterns in collaborative writing and potential use cases for the tool. In several recent articles that Olson has had a part in writing, such as "How People Write Together Now: Beginning the Investigation with Advanced Undergraduates in a Project Course" in March 2017 and "Now that we can write simultaneously, how do we use that to our advantage?" in July 2017, Olson has continued to investigate and discuss collaborative word processors and the ways that they can potentially be used most effectively.

Olson retired in December 2016, but is still active in research. He is currently an Emeritus Professor at both University of California, Irvine and the University of Michigan.

== Achievements ==
In 2003, Olson was elected to the CHI Academy.

In 2006, Olson, along with his wife Judith S. Olson, received the SIGCHI Lifetime Achievement Award.

In 2007, he was elected to ACM Fellows for his contributions to computer-supported collaborative work.

In 2009, he was named an APS Fellow for his work in the cognitive field.

In 2010, he was named an APA Fellow.

In 2016, he received the SIGCHI Lifetime Service Award.
