= University of Maryland Graduate School, Baltimore =

Educational institution in the United States

- Type: Public
- Established: 1985
- Dean: Dr. Kenneth H. Wong (UMB)
- Location: Baltimore, Maryland, United States
- Campus: Urban
- Website: http://graduate.umaryland.edu

Created in 1985, the University of Maryland Graduate School, Baltimore (UMGSB) represents the combined graduate and research programs at the University of Maryland, Baltimore County and the University of Maryland, Baltimore (UMB), the university system's doctoral research campuses in the Baltimore area.

The Graduate School offers graduate education and training in biomedical, health, and human service sciences. It offers 23 Master of Science (MS) and Doctor of Philosophy (PhD) degree programs, and three post-baccalaureate certificate programs in these areas of study. They also offer dual degrees with the University's professional schools including PhD/MD, PhD/PharmD and PhD/DDS degree programs, and we participate in inter-institutional studies in biochemistry, gerontology, and toxicology with other University System of Maryland campuses. The Graduate School at the University of Maryland, Baltimore has been offering master’s and doctoral studies on the UMB campus since 1917.

Research efforts, supported by research grants and contracts, are undertaken collaboratively with the National Institutes of Health, the National Science Foundation, the University of Maryland Medical Center, the Veterans Affairs Medical center, the Institutes for Human Virology, the University of Maryland Biotechnology Institute, and others.

== University of Maryland, Baltimore graduate programs ==
The following are programs offered at the University of Maryland, Baltimore campus.

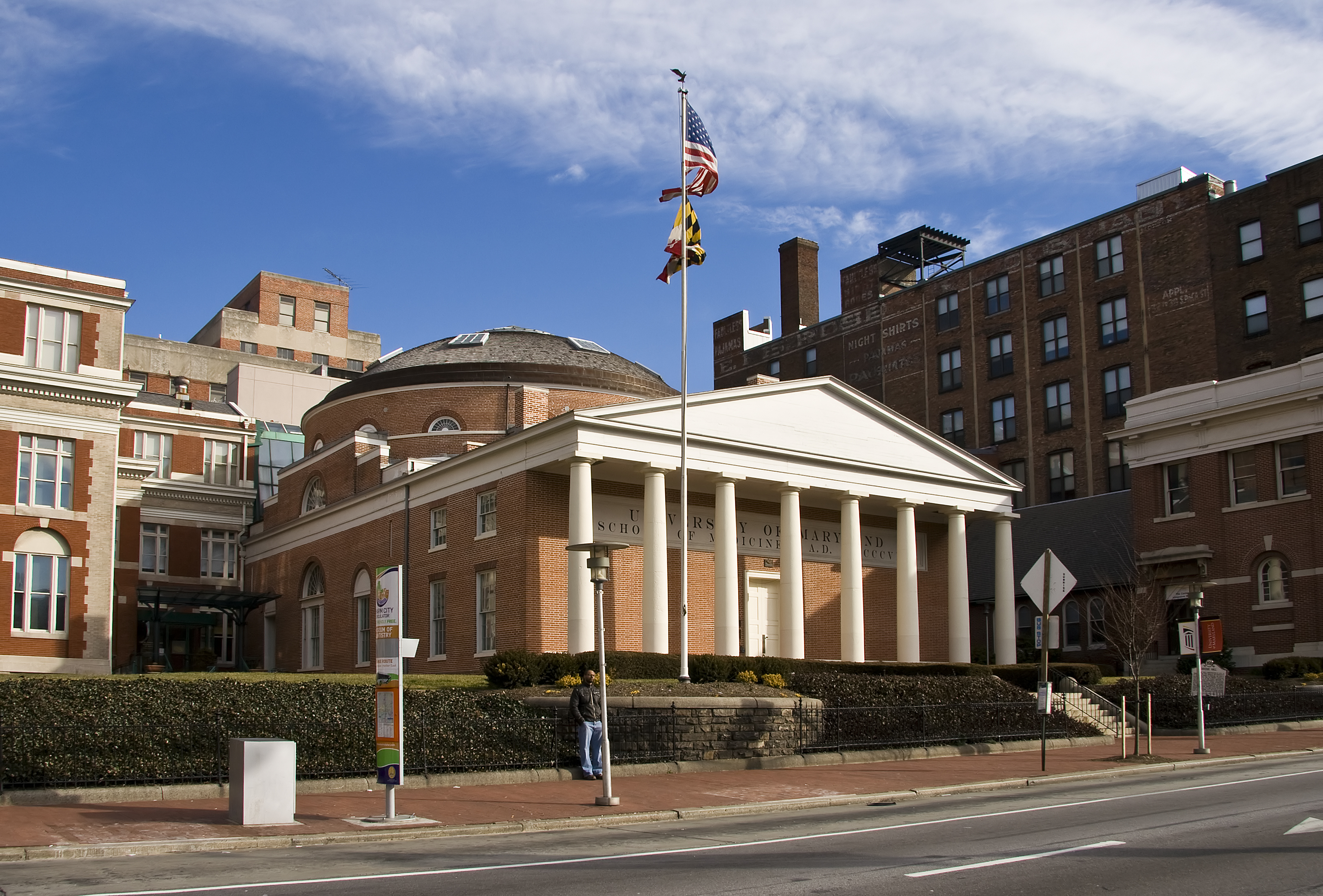
Davidge Hall at the University of Maryland, Baltimore

- Life Sciences
- Clinical Research
- Epidemiology and Human Genetics
- Forensic Medicine
- Gerontology
- Biochemistry and Molecular Biology
- Molecular Medicine
- Microbiology and Molecular Immunology
- Neuroscience
- Physical Rehabilitation Science
- Marine-Estuarine-Environmental Science
- Medical and Research Technology
- Nursing
- Oral and Experimental Pathology
- Pathology
- Pharmaceutical Health Services Research
- Pharmaceutical Sciences
- Pharmacometrics
- Regulatory Science
- Research Ethics
- Social Work

== See also ==
- University of Maryland, Baltimore
- University System of Maryland
