= Matthias Grossglauser =

Swiss communication engineer

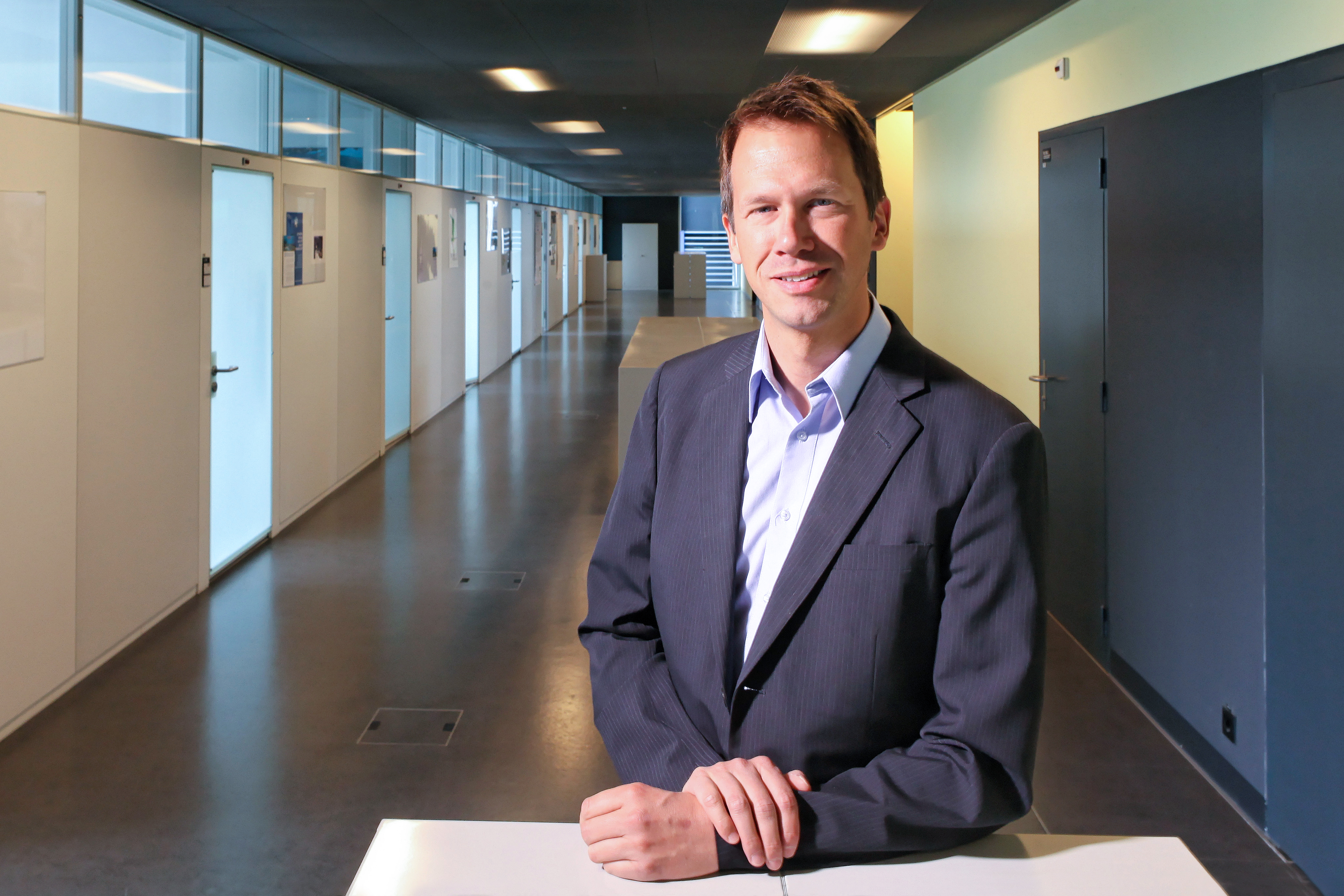
- Grossglauser in 2012
- Born: 1969 (age 56–57); Niederbipp, Switzerland
- Education: EPFL; Georgia Tech; Pierre and Marie Curie University
- Scientific career
- Fields: Machine learning, data analytics, network science, computational social science, discrete choice theory
- Workplaces: EPFL (École Polytechnique Fédérale de Lausanne)
- Thesis: Control of Network Resources over Multiple Time-Scales (Contrôle des Ressources de Réseaux sur des Échelles Temporelles Multiples) (1998)
- Doctoral advisor: Jean-Chrysostome Bolot
- Website: indy.epfl.ch

Matthias Grossglauser (born 1969 in Niederbipp, Switzerland) is a Swiss communication engineer. He is a professor of computer science at EPFL (École Polytechnique Fédérale de Lausanne) and co-director of the Information and Network Dynamics Laboratory (INDY) at EPFL's School of Computer and Communication Sciences School of Basic Sciences.

== Career ==
Grossglauser studied communication systems and electrical engineering at EPFL and at Georgia Institute of Technology, respectively, and graduated from both with Master's degrees in 1994. He received a PhD with highest honors in computer science from the Pierre and Marie Curie University (UPMC) in Paris in 1998. His PhD thesis on "Control of Network Resources over Multiple Time-Scales" (in the French original: Contrôle des ressources de réseaux sur des échelles temporelles multiples) was supervised by Jean-Chrysostome Bolot. He then joined AT&T's Networking and Distributed Systems Laboratory (Shannon Labs) at Florham Park, New Jersey as a principal research scientist. In 2003, he moved as an assistant professor to EPFL's School of Computer and Communication Sciences. In 2007, he joined the Nokia Research Center (NRC) in Helsinki first as director of the Internet Laboratory, before becoming head of Data Insight program and member of the CEO Technology Council in 2009. In 2011, he became associate professor at EPFL's School of Computer and Communication Sciences where he was promoted to a full professor position in 2021.

== Research ==
Grossglauser's research focuses on machine learning and data analytics, and on their applications in network science, computational social sciences, and recommender systems. His fields of interest encompass among others graph mining, mobility mining, epidemics, discrete-choice models, active learning, and network traffic measurement.

Graph Mining: Graph-structured datasets encompass online social networks (OSNs; e.g., Facebook, LinkedIn, and Twitter) and biological networks (e.g., proteins-protein interaction (PPI) and gene regulatory networks) that can be investigated by data analytics techniques to extract knowledge and make predictions. He employs stochastic models for large graphs and analyses them through the application of algorithms to gain a fundamental understanding about the properties of the components.

Mobility Mining: Grossglauser investigates the application of machine learning to harvest the rich structure of mobility date generated by millions of users on the move through their smartphones. He is interested in applications such as location-based advertisement, navigation and transportation, and augmented reality.

Epidemics: Epidemic models enables the study of dynamics and long-term asymptotics of epidemic processes, such as infectious diseases or the dissemination of ideas in social networks. It also explores measure such as vaccination to slow the process, or deliberate infections to optimize the spread of an opinion. In this field Grossglauser is interested in estimation problems on epidemics under monitoring budget constraints.

Discrete-choice models: He examines new implementation and stochastic models for choices, comparisons, and rankings in online contexts, as well as their issues of large-scale inference and active learning.

Active Learning: He investigates and implements earning methods that balance the competing goal of gaining more knowledge by exploring new data on the fly. Goal is an ad hoc optimisation of the learning process based on the current state of knowledge.

Network traffic measurement: Grossglauser jointly with Nick Duffield is the developer of the trajectory sampling (TS) method. It aims at making traffic measurement for network operators more efficient and less error-prone, while being compatible with existing IP protocols and packet formats. Its development led to the formation of the PSAMP working group at the IETF that standardized TS, and has since become an official IETF standard.

== Distinctions ==
Grossglauser is a fellow of the IEEE (2021), for contributions to the modeling and analysis of network traffic and data, a member of the Association for Computing Machinery (ACM), commissioner of the Swiss Federal Communications Commission (ComCom; the independent regulatory authority of the Swiss telecommunications market), and a board member of the Swiss Informatics Research Association (SIRA).

He is the recipient of the 2014 Best Paper Award at ACM Conference of Online Social Networks for his paper on “Mining Democracy”, the 2012 Winning Algorithm Award at the "Nokia Mobile Data Challenge: Next Place Prediction," the 2006 ACM SIGCOMM/CoNEXT Rising Star Award, the 2001 Best Paper Award at the IEEE INFOCOM for his paper on “Mobility Increases the Capacity of Ad-hoc Wireless Networks”, and the 1998 Cor Baayen Award from the European Research Consortium for Informatics and Mathematics (ERCIM).

== Selected works ==
- Chumbalov, Daniyar; Maystre, Lucas; Grossglauser, Matthias (2020-11-21). "Scalable and Efficient Comparison-based Search without Features". International Conference on Machine Learning. PMLR: 1995–2005. arXiv:1905.05049.
- Salehi, Farnood; Trouleau, William; Grossglauser, Matthias; Thiran, Patrick (2019-11-01). "Learning Hawkes Processes from a Handful of Events". arXiv:1911.00292 [cs.LG].
- Maystre, Lucas; Grossglauser, Matthias (2017-07-17). "Just Sort It! A Simple and Effective Approach to Active Preference Learning". International Conference on Machine Learning. PMLR: 2344–2353.
- Kazemi, Ehsan; Hassani, Hamed; Grossglauser, Matthias; Pezeshgi Modarres, Hassan (2016). "PROPER: Global protein interaction network alignment through percolation matching". BMC Bioinformatics. 17 (1): 527. doi:10.1186/s12859-016-1395-9. PMC 5153870. PMID 27955623.
- "Login - Infoscience".
- Kazemi, Ehsan; Hassani, S. Hamed; Grossglauser, Matthias (2015). "Growing a graph matching from a handful of seeds" (PDF). Proceedings of the VLDB Endowment. 8 (10): 1010–1021. doi:10.14778/2794367.2794371.
- Yartseva, Lyudmila; Grossglauser, Matthias (2013). "On the performance of percolation graph matching". Proceedings of the first ACM conference on Online social networks - COSN '13. pp. 119–130. doi:10.1145/2512938.2512952. ISBN 9781450320849. S2CID 6352205.
- Kafsi, Mohamed; Grossglauser, Matthias; Thiran, Patrick (2013). "The Entropy of Conditional Markov Trajectories". IEEE Transactions on Information Theory. 59 (9): 5577–5583. arXiv:1212.2831. Bibcode:2013ITIT...59.5577K. doi:10.1109/TIT.2013.2262497. S2CID 8359957.
- Pedarsani, Pedram; Grossglauser, Matthias (2011). "On the privacy of anonymized networks". Proceedings of the 17th ACM SIGKDD international conference on Knowledge discovery and data mining - KDD '11. p. 1235. doi:10.1145/2020408.2020596. ISBN 9781450308137. S2CID 15970415.
