= Dan Olsen =

American computer scientist

Dan R. Olsen Jr.
- Born: June 22, 1953 (age 72)
- Scientific career
- Fields: Computer science

Dan R. Olsen Jr. (born June 22, 1953) is an American computer scientist who specialized in the fields of human–computer interaction and information science. He worked in the computer science department of Brigham Young University from 1984 until his retirement in 2015, serving as chair of the department (1992–96), and also directed the Human-Computer Interaction Institute at Carnegie Mellon University (1996–98).

== Education ==
Dan R. Olsen gained his Bachelor of Science (1976) and Master of Science (1978) in computer science from Brigham Young University and his PhD in computer and information science from University of Pennsylvania (1981).

== Career and research ==
In 1981, Olsen became an assistant professor at Arizona State University. In 1984, he moved to Brigham Young University as an assistant professor, rising to associate professor (1986) and professor (1990). He served as Department Chair of Computer Science in 1992–96, and was the director of the Interactive Computing Everywhere) (ICE) Laboratory. During his career at Brigham Young, he also served as a professor and the inaugural director of the Human-Computer Interaction Institute at Carnegie Mellon University (1996–98). He retired in 2015.

His research was in the fields of human–computer interaction and information science.

== Awards, honours and societies ==
Olsen was elected as fellow of the Association for Computing Machinery (ACM) in 2006 for his work on user interface technology. He was the inaugural editor of the society's journal, ACM Transactions on Computer-Human Interaction (TOCHI). He is a CHI Academy member and gained the CHI Lifetime Research Award in 2012.

== Selected published works ==
=== Books ===
- Building Interactive Systems: Principles for Human-Computer Interaction (2009)
- Developing user interfaces: ensuring usability through product & process (1993)
- User Interface Management Systems: Models and Algorithms (1992)

=== Research articles ===
- Laser pointer interaction (CHI, 2001)
- Interactive machine learning (IUI, 2003)
- Evaluating user interface systems research (UIST, 2007)
- SYNGRAPH: A graphical user interface generator (ACM SIGGRAPH Computer Graphics, 1983)
- Cross-modal interaction using XWeb (UIST, 2000)
- MIKE: the menu interaction kontrol environment (ACM Transactions on Graphics, 1986)
