= ACM Transactions on Computer-Human Interaction =

- Discipline: Human–computer interaction
- Language: English
- Edited by: Kristina Höök

Publication details
- History: 1994–present
- Publisher: Association for Computing Machinery
- Frequency: Quarterly

Standard abbreviations
- ISO 4: ACM Trans. Comput.-Hum. Interact.

Indexing
- CODEN: ATCIF4
- ISSN: 1073-0516 (print); 1557-7325 (web)
- LCCN: 94644508
- OCLC no.: 712803302

Links
- Journal homepage; Online access; Online archive

ACM Transactions on Computer-Human Interaction is a peer-reviewed scientific journal covering research on human–computer interaction. It was established in 1994 and is published by the Association for Computing Machinery.

== Editors-in-chief ==
The following persons have been editors-in-chief of the journal:

- Kasper Hornbæk, University of Copenhagen (2023–present)
- Kristina Höök, KTH Royal Institute of Technology (2018–2024)
- Ken Hinckley, Microsoft Research (2016–present)
- Shumin Zhai, IBM Almaden Research Center (2009–2015)
- John M. Carroll (2003–2009)
- Jonathan Grudin (1997–2003)
- Dan R. Olsen Jr. (1994–1997)
