= Judith S. Olson =

Computer scientist

Judith S. Olson is an American researcher best known for her work in the field of human-computer interaction and the effect of distance on teamwork.

Olson began her career at the University of Michigan before later moving to the University of California, Irvine. She first retired in 2008 from the University of Michigan, joined University of California, Irvine and then retired again in 2017, with over 110 research articles to her name.

== Education ==
In 1965, Judith Olson received her B.A. in Mathematics and Psychology from Northwestern University. In 1969, she received her Ph.D. in Mathematical Psychology at the University of Michigan. Following the completion of her Ph.D., she attended Stanford University in 1970 as a Postdoctoral Fellow in Cognitive Psychology.

== Life and career ==
From 1970 to 2008, Olson taught at the University of Michigan as a professor in both the Department of Psychology and in the Computer and Information Systems Group. She retired in 2008 from the University of Michigan, where she was made a Professor Emerita for her contributions to the field of Human Computer Interaction. Currently, Olson serves as a Bren Professor of Information and Computer Sciences at the University of California, Irvine. Her husband, Gary M. Olson, was also a Bren Professor of Information and Computer Sciences at UCI before retiring in 2016 and is a frequent co-author of her research works.

== Research and publications ==
Olson has published over 110 research articles, primarily focusing on the field of Human Computer Interaction and Computer-Supported Cooperative Work. She has also contributed to several textbooks on collaboration and distance, the most recent of which include Scientific Collaboration on the Internet (2008), Working Together Apart (2014), and Enhancing the Effectiveness of Team Science (2015).

Her most cited paper, “Distance Matters” (Olson & Olson, 2000), studied the effects of geographic distance on teamwork and communication. Analyzing more than a decade's worth of remote and in-person group collaboration, they found that remotely-located team members had difficulty establishing the same context, or what the researchers dubbed “common ground,” when posing questions to one another. Furthermore, collaborative efforts were hindered by a lack of willingness to learn the technology and a lack of incentive to share personal discoveries with remote coworkers. Her involvement in the study of Virtual Teams builds upon the findings in “Distance Matters,” and aims to provide remote work teams with the “tools, methods, and processes” to successfully collaborate regardless of physical distance.

Olson's interests also span the field of education, where she is researching the role that telepresence robots play in reducing the social and educational barrier chronically ill or disabled children face when they are kept from school and classmates for extended periods of time. To this end, Olson is currently working on learning the effectiveness of iPads as a videoconferencing bridge between a child at home and his or her school so that they can remotely attend class discussions, lectures, and socialize with friends. She works with students (e.g., Dakuo Wang) and faculty from UCI to build and maintain AuthorViz and DocuViz, tools for visualizing author and revision histories in Google Docs, respectively.

== Awards and honors ==
- 2001 - Inducted into the CHI Academy
- 2006 - Received the CHI Lifetime Achievement Award
- 2008 - Received ACM Fellow Award
  - For contributions to human-computer interaction and computer-supported cooperative work.
- 2011 - Winner of the ACM Athena Lecturer Award
- 2018 - Elected to the National Academy of Engineering
