= FX Palo Alto Laboratory =

FX Palo Alto Laboratory, Inc.
- Company type: Private
- Industry: Information Technology
- Founded: California, USA (1995)
- Fate: Shut down
- Headquarters: 3174 Porter Dr. Palo Alto, California, 94304
- Key people: Haruhiko Yoshida, Deputy President, Fuji Xerox Co., Ltd. (Chairman); Yasuaki Onishi, President & CEO; Lynn Wilcox, CTO; Chikako Konohana, CFO; Tsutomu Abe, Corporate Secretary
- Products: Intellectual Property
- Number of employees: ~40 (2006)

FX Palo Alto Laboratory, Inc. (FXPAL) was a research lab for Fuji Xerox Co. Ltd. FXPAL employed roughly 40 people, including 25 Ph.D. research scientists. In addition, FXPAL had a strong intern program with 10 summer interns each year from universities worldwide and as well as visiting researchers from Fuji Xerox Japan. There were three primary research areas: Internet of Things (IoT), Artificial Intelligence (AI) and Human Computer Interaction (HCI). Focus in IoT was on augmented reality and localization, in AI on text and image analysis and in HCI on visualization and interaction. A particular strength of FXPAL was the collaboration among researchers in these different areas, as well as with artists, designers and other non-academic employees.

FXPAL's mission was to provide Fuji Xerox with new technology and business ideas to augment its existing printer/copier business. Lab goals were to:

- Invent new technology to address issues of customers and society.
- Translate successful technologies into Fuji Xerox products.
- Find licensing opportunities for FXPAL intellectual property.

FXPAL was shut down in 2020, prior to the termination of the FujiFilm agreement with Xerox and its subsequent renaming as FujiFilm Business Innovation [1].

== Patents and Publications ==
FXPAL was known for its technology inventions, which resulted in over 100 patents, filed mainly in the US [2] and Japan. Patents were originally assigned to Xerox and later to Fuji Xerox. FXPAL’s primary monetary success was through patent licensing.

FXPAL also gained recognition in the academic community, with hundreds of papers published in academic journals and conferences. These included the ACM Multimedia Conference, the IEEE International Conference on Multimedia and Expo, and the ACM Conference on Human Factors in Computing (CHI).

== Videos ==
To demonstrate technology to a wider audience outside the lab, FXPAL produced a number of videos. These included:

- Polly, a wearable telepresence system that allows a remote viewer to control a camera worn by a person in a physical environment. This video demonstrates the use of Polly in a tour of the Stanford campus for a bedridden quadriplegic.
- DOTS, a multi-camera surveillance system that is used to monitor views of interest. This video shows the use of DOTS in following a person moving through an office building.
- RMO, an application designed to facilitate organization of photos using time-based event detection and face identification along with an intuitive user interface. This video shows the process of organizing photos along these various dimensions.
- Tabletop Telepresence, a system for remote collaboration through teleconferencing combined with a digital desk. This video shows the evolution of this technology through collaboration with artists and research scientists.

== See also ==
- FujiFilm Business Innovation
- Xerox
