= Michel Beaudouin-Lafon =

French computer scientist

- Born: 20 July 1961 (age 65)
- Citizenship: French
- Education: Paris-Sud 11 University (PhD)
- Awards: CHI Academy
- Scientific career
- Fields: Computer Science (Human-Computer Interaction)
- Workplaces: Paris-Saclay University

Michel Beaudouin-Lafon (born 20 July 1961) is a French computer scientist working in the field of human–computer interaction. He received his PhD from the Paris-Sud 11 University (which is now Paris-Saclay University) in 1985. He is currently professor of computer science at Paris-Sud 11 University since 1992 (in the in Situ group) and was director of LRI, the laboratory for computer science, from 2002 to 2009.

He has been working in Human-Computer Interaction for over 20 years and was elected to the ACM SIGCHI Academy in 2006. His research interests include fundamental aspects of interaction, engineering of interactive systems, computer-supported cooperative work and novel interaction techniques. In 2004, his paper "Designing interaction, not interfaces" has been one of the most heavily downloaded papers in the ACM Digital Library. He has been featured in Ben Shneiderman's HCI Pioneers.

Michel Beaudouin-Lafon was one of the founders, and first president, of AFIHM, the French national equivalent of Association for Computing Machinery SIGCHI. In recent years he has played major roles in CHI and UIST conferences, serving as program chair or program committee member. From 2002 to 2008, he was a member-at-large of the ACM Council and member of the ACM Publications Board. He was named to the 2022 class of ACM Fellows, "for contributions to human-computer interaction, instrumental interaction and generative theory, and community leadership".
