= Conference on Human Factors in Computing Systems =

Annual academic conference

- Abbreviation: CHI
- Discipline: Human–computer interaction

Publication details
- Publisher: ACM SIGCHI
- History: 1982–present
- Frequency: annual

The ACM Conference on Human Factors in Computing Systems (CHI) series of academic conferences is generally considered the most prestigious in the field of human–computer interaction. It is hosted by ACM SIGCHI, the Special Interest Group on computer–human interaction. CHI has been held annually since 1982 and attracts thousands of international attendees.

== History ==
The CHI conference series started with the Human Factors in Computer Systems conference in Gaithersburg, Maryland, US in 1982, organized by Bill Curtis and Ben Shneiderman. During this meeting the formation of the ACM Special Interest Group on Computer–Human Interaction (SIGCHI) was first publicly announced. ACM SIGCHI became the sponsor of the Conference on Human Factors in Computing Systems. The first CHI conference was held in Boston, Massachusetts, US, in 1983. The second conference took place in San Francisco, in 1985. Since then, CHI conferences have been held annually in spring each year. Until 1992 the conference was held in Canada or the US. In 1993 CHI moved to Europe for the first time and was held in Amsterdam, the Netherlands.

Over the years, CHI has grown in popularity. The 1982 meeting drew 907 attendees. CHI 90 attracted 2,314. Attendance has been fairly stable since then. After the early years CHI became highly selective. Since 1993 the acceptance rate for full papers was consistently below 30 percent. After 1992 the average acceptance rate was around 20 percent. The number of accepted full papers is slowly increasing and reached 157 accepted papers with an acceptance rate of 22 percent in 2008. CHI reached over 3,300 attendees in 2013 and 3,855 in 2019.

CHI 2020, which was originally planned to take place on April, was cancelled due to COVID-19, and CHI 2021 was held online as a virtual conference chaired by Yoshifumi Kitamura and Aaron Quigley. CHI 2021 “making waves, combining strengths” was originally scheduled to take place in Yokohama.

== Tracks ==
The CHI conference consists of multiple tracks, including:

- Academic papers and notes (short papers) on a variety of topics, such as (ubiquitous computing, visualization, usability and user experience design)
- Posters and demonstrations
- Workshops and courses hosted by domain experts
- Invited panels on relevant topics
- Case studies from industry practitioners

== Past and upcoming CHI conferences ==
Past and future CHI conferences include:

Year	City	Country	Link	Total attendance	Completed Paper Submissions	Accepted papers (Note: Submission and acceptance figures follow the categories reported by the cited sources. Some historical figures cover full papers only, while others combine papers and notes; they exclude separately reviewed tracks such as posters, workshops and extended abstracts.)	Acceptance rate (Note: Accepted papers divided by submissions, rounded to one decimal place.)
1982	Gaithersburg	(United States) USA		906	165	75	45.5%
1983	Boston	(United States) USA		1,000	176	59	33.5%
1985	San Francisco	(United States) USA		1,250	170	35	20.6%
1986	Boston	(United States) USA		1,275	122	47	38.5%
1987	Toronto	Canada		1,300	166	46	27.7%
1988	Washington D.C.	(United States) USA		1,450	187	39	20.9%
1989	Austin	(United States) US		1,611	199	54	27.1%
1990	Seattle	(United States) USA		2,263	260	47	18.1%
1991	New Orleans	(United States) USA		1,762	240	56	23.3%
1992	Monterey	(United States) USA		2,350	216	67	31.0%
1993	Amsterdam	Netherlands		1,608	330	62	18.8%
1994	Boston	(United States) USA		2,618	263	70	26.6%
1995	Denver	(United States) US	https://chi1995.acm.org/	2,254	228	66	28.9%
1996	Vancouver	Canada	https://chi1996.acm.org/	2,344	256	55	21.5%
1997	Atlanta	(United States) USA	https://chi1997.acm.org/	2,081	234	55	23.5%
1998	Los Angeles	(United States) USA	https://chi1998.acm.org/	2,310	351	81	23.1%
1999	Pittsburgh	(United States) USA	https://chi1999.acm.org/	2,264	312	78	25.0%
2000	The Hague	Netherlands	https://chi2000.acm.org/	2,628	336	72	21.4%
2001	Seattle	(United States) USA	https://chi2001.acm.org/	2,832	352	69	19.6%
2002	Minneapolis	(United States) USA	https://chi2002.acm.org/	1,726	414	61	14.7%
2003	Fort Lauderdale	(United States) USA	https://chi2003.acm.org/	1,435	468	75	16.0%
2004	Vienna	Austria	https://chi2004.acm.org/	1,815	592	93	15.7%
2005	Portland	(United States) USA	https://chi2005.acm.org/	1,947	372	93	25.0%
2006	Montreal	Canada	https://chi2006.acm.org/	2,250	508	118 (Note: Full papers only; the cited historical dataset reports 508 submissions and 118 acceptances.)	23.2%
2007	San Jose	(United States) USA	https://chi2007.acm.org/	2,620	840	182	21.7%
2008	Florence	Italy	https://chi2008.acm.org/	2,361	714	157	22.0%
2009	Boston	(United States) USA	https://chi2009.acm.org/	2,358	1,130	277	24.5%
2010	Atlanta	(United States) USA	http://chi2010.acm.org/	2,384	1,346	302	22.4%
2011	Vancouver	Canada	http://chi2011.acm.org/	2,822	1,532	410	26.8%
2012	Austin, Texas	(United States) USA	http://chi2012.acm.org	2,616	1,577	370	23.5%
2013	Paris	France	http://chi2013.acm.org	3,443	1,963	392	20.0%
2014	Toronto	Canada	http://chi2014.acm.org	3,001	2,043	465	22.8%
2015	Seoul	South Korea	http://chi2015.acm.org	2,896	2,120	486	22.9%
2016	San Jose	(United States) USA	http://chi2016.acm.org/	3,624	2,435	565	23.2%
2017	Denver	(United States) USA	https://chi2017.acm.org	2,939	2,400	600	25.0%
2018	Montreal	Canada	https://chi2018.acm.org/	3,372	2,590	666	25.7%
2019	Glasgow	(United Kingdom) UK	https://chi2019.acm.org/	3,855	2,958	703	23.8%
2020	Cancelled (Note: Originally scheduled to take place in Honolulu, Hawaii.)		https://chi2020.acm.org/	Canceled due to Covid-19	3,126	760	24.3%
2021	Virtual (Note: Originally scheduled to take place in Yokohama, Japan.)		https://chi2021.acm.org/	5,145	2,845	747	26.3%
2022	New Orleans, LA	(United States) USA	https://chi2022.acm.org/	3,806	2,579	637	24.7%
2023	Hamburg	Germany	https://chi2023.acm.org/	4,721	3,182	879	27.6%
2024	Honolulu	(United States) USA	https://chi2024.acm.org/	4,120	4,028	1,058	26.3%
2025	Yokohama	Japan	https://chi2025.acm.org/	5,675	5,020	1,249	24.9%
2026	Barcelona	Spain	https://chi2026.acm.org/	5,254 (Note: Reported on-site attendance.)	6,731	1,702	25.3%
2027	Pittsburgh	(United States) USA	https://chi2027.acm.org/		7,743	—	—
40-year historical acceptance rate (1987–2027) (Note: Arithmetic mean of the 40 annual acceptance rates displayed for 1987–2027, giving each year equal weight.):							23.37%
