= ACM Symposium on User Interface Software and Technology =

Annual academic conference in computer science

The ACM Symposium on User Interface Software and Technology (UIST) is an annual academic conference on the software and hardware of human–computer interaction. It is sponsored by ACM SIGCHI and ACM SIGGRAPH. Its scope includes input and output devices, tangible and ubiquitous computing, smart environments, virtual and augmented reality, computer-supported cooperative work, and human-centered artificial intelligence.

== Overview ==
UIST emphasizes technical contributions to interactive computing, including new interaction techniques, devices, software tools and systems. The program includes peer-reviewed research papers, demonstrations, posters, workshops, a doctoral symposium, and a student innovation contest. Demonstrations provide opportunities to experience research prototypes alongside the presentation of papers. Paper selection is competitive: over the past decade, UIST's annual paper acceptance rate averaged around 23%.

UIST research has also been studied for its influence beyond academic publishing. A 2023 CHI paper, Breaking Out of the Ivory Tower: A Large-scale Analysis of Patent Citations to HCI Research, analyzed approximately 70,000 patent citations to research from major HCI venues. It found that 60–80% of UIST papers over a twenty-year period were cited in United States patents, compared with 20.1% of papers across the four principal HCI venues in the study (CHI, CSCW, UIST and UbiComp), 5% at selected leading artificial intelligence conferences, 11% at natural language processing conferences, and 25% at computer vision conferences. The authors interpreted this as evidence of substantial connections between HCI research and industrial invention, while stressing that patent citations measure only one route of influence and do not by themselves demonstrate adoption in products or commercial impact.

== History ==
UIST grew out of three invitation-only workshops on user-interface software held during the early 1980s, two supported by SIGGRAPH. The first conference took place in Banff, Alberta in 1988. Organizers expected about 100 participants but attracted more than 200. The conference was established as a forum for the engineering and technological aspects of HCI, complementing the social and behavioral emphasis of CHI.

The early program included interface toolkits, user-interface management systems, programming languages, graphical interaction and rapid prototyping. By 2004, the conference's stated scope also encompassed web interfaces, tangible and ubiquitous computing, virtual and augmented reality, multimedia and collaborative systems. Subsequent programs included digital fabrication and programmable materials, alongside new input and sensing techniques. In the 2020s, human-centered AI became an explicit part of the conference's scope; the 2023 student innovation contest, for example, focused on interaction with large language models.

The conference has expanded substantially in the number of submissions and accepted papers over the years. ACM's statistics record 116 submissions and 25 accepted papers in 2003, and 288 submissions and 62 accepted papers in 2012. Submissions increased to 483 in 2023, 608 in 2024, 947 in 2025 and 1,259 in 2026. Attendance increased from 483 in 2022 to 682 in 2023, 741 in 2024 and 849 in 2025. In 2026, attendance reached 870.

UIST used a single-track format through 2013. In 2014, it introduced two parallel technical tracks; the organizers attributed the change to community growth and the difficulty of fitting more papers into a single track without shortening presentations further. The 2024 conference was organized primarily around two tracks; in 2026, the paper program comprised five tracks and 40 sessions.

== Past conferences ==
Locations and chairs are listed in the conference archive and the individual conference websites. Paper statistics refer to the main research-paper selection process, excluding separately selected posters, demonstrations and other adjunct contributions. Acceptance rates below are accepted papers divided by submissions, rounded to one decimal place. An em dash (—) indicates that a figure is unavailable or unknown, not zero. Attendance includes online participants for the two virtual editions, which are not directly comparable with in-person meetings.

Year	City	Country	Program chair(s)	General chair(s)	Submitted papers	Accepted papers	Acceptance rate	Attendees	Website
2026	Detroit	USA	Amy Pavel, Anhong Guo, Clemens Klokmose, Jean Song, Juho Kim, Valkyrie Savage	Michael Nebeling, Steve Oney	1,259 (Note: The submission total includes desk-rejected papers; 1,175 proceeded to full review.)	253	20.1%	870 (Note: Registration-chair figures supplied for this revision give 253 accepted papers and 870 attendees. The published 2026 plenary slides instead report 251 accepted papers (19.9%) and 885 attendees.)	Official website
2025	Busan	South Korea	Andrea Bianchi, Wendy Mackay, Shengdong Zhao, Elena Glassman	Ian Oakley, Jeeeun Kim	947	210	22.2%	849	Official website
2024	Pittsburgh, PA	USA	Alexandra Ion, Pedro Lopes	Lining Yao, Mayank Goel	608	146	24.0%	741	Official website
2023	San Francisco, CA	USA	Jürgen Steimle, Nathalie Henry Riche	Jeff Han, Sean Follmer	483	121	25.1%	682	Official website
2022	Bend, OR	USA	Eytan Adar, Vidya Setlur	Jacob O. Wobbrock, Maneesh Agrawala	372	98	26.3%	483	Official website
2021	Virtual Event	N/A	Ranjitha Kumar, Michael Nebeling	Jeff Nichols	367	95	25.9%	565 (online)	Official website
2020	Virtual Event	N/A	Fanny Chevalier, Stefanie Mueller	Shamsi Iqbal, Karon MacLean	450	97	21.6%	710 (online)	Official website
2019	New Orleans, LA	USA	Michael Bernstein, Katharina Reinecke	François Guimbretière	381	93	24.4%	512 (Note: The registration-chair figures and the 2026 retrospective chart give 512 attendees; the 2020 organizers’ report gives 510. The registration-chair figures give 381 submissions, while the previously consulted acceptance-rate database lists 382.)	Official website
2018	Berlin	Germany	Andrew D. Wilson	Patrick Baudisch, Albrecht Schmidt	375	80	21.3%	560	Official website
2017	Quebec City	Canada	Chris Harrison, Jennifer Mankoff	Krzysztof Gajos	324	73	22.5%	387	Official website
2016	Tokyo	Japan	Jacob O. Wobbrock, Daniel Avrahami	Jun Rekimoto, Takeo Igarashi	384	79	20.6%	648	Official website
2015	Charlotte, NC	USA	Björn Hartmann, Tovi Grossman	Celine Latulipe	297	70	23.6%	347	Official website
2014	Honolulu, HI	USA	Mira Dontcheva, Daniel Wigdor	Hrvoje Benko	333	74	22.2%	461	Official website
2013	St. Andrews	Scotland, UK	Ivan Poupyrev, Takeo Igarashi	Shahram Izadi, Aaron Quigley	317	62	19.6%	411 (Note: The registration-chair figures and the 2026 retrospective chart give 411 attendees; the 2015 SIGCHI viability report lists 335.)	Official website
2012	Cambridge, MA	USA	Hrvoje Benko, Celine Latulipe	Rob Miller	288	62	21.5%	410	Official website
2011	Santa Barbara, CA	USA	Maneesh Agrawala, Scott Klemmer	Jeff Pierce	262	67	25.6%	284 (Note: The registration-chair figures and the 2026 retrospective chart give 284 attendees; the 2015 SIGCHI viability report lists 348.)	Official website
2010	New York, NY	USA	Mary Czerwinski, Rob Miller	Ken Perlin	207	38	18.4%	—	Official website
2009	Victoria, BC	Canada	François Guimbretière	Andrew D. Wilson	183	33	18.0%	279	Official website
2008	Monterey, CA	USA	Michel Beaudouin-Lafon	Steve Cousins	115	25	21.7%	227	Official website
2007	Newport, RI	USA	Ravin Balakrishnan	Chia Shen / Rob Jacob	129	24	18.6%	195	Official website
2006	Montreux	Switzerland	Ken Hinckley	Pierre Wellner	177	40	22.6%	—	Official website
2005	Seattle, WA	USA	Dan Olsen	Patrick Baudisch, Mary Czerwinski	159	31	19.5%	—	Official website
2004	Santa Fe, NM	USA	James Landay	Steve Feiner	170	36	21.2%	—	Official website
2003	Vancouver, BC	Canada	Gregory Abowd, Blair MacIntyre	Joseph A. Konstan	116	25	21.6%	—	Official website
2002	Paris	France	W. Keith Edwards	Michel Beaudouin-Lafon	—	—	—	—	Official website
2001	Orlando, FL	USA	Beth Mynatt	Joe Marks	—	—	—	—	Official website
2000	San Diego, CA	USA	Scott Hudson	Mark Ackerman, W. Keith Edwards	—	—	—	—	Official website
1999	Asheville, NC	USA	Joe Marks	Brad Vander Zanden	—	—	—	—	Official website
1998	San Francisco, CA	USA	Rob Jacob	Elizabeth Mynatt	—	—	—	—	Official website
1997	Banff, Alberta	Canada	Chris Schmandt	George Robertson	—	—	—	—	Official website
1996	Seattle, WA	USA	Marc Brown	David Kurlander	—	—	—	—	Official website
1995	Pittsburgh, PA	USA	George Robertson	Brad A. Myers	—	—	—	—	Official website
1994	Marina del Rey, CA	USA	Steve Feiner	Pedro Szekely	—	—	—	—	Official website
1993	Atlanta, GA	USA	Randy Pausch	Scott Hudson	—	—	—	—	—
1992	Monterey, CA	USA	Mark Green	Jock Mackinlay, Mark Green	—	—	—	—	—
1991	Hilton Head, SC	USA	Jock Mackinlay	James R. Rhyne	—	—	—	—	—
1990	Snowbird, UT	USA	Scott Hudson	Dan Olsen	—	—	—	—	—
1989	Williamsburg, VA	USA	Dan Olsen	John Sibert	—	—	—	—	—
1988	Banff, Alberta	Canada	John Sibert	Mark Green	—	—	—	>200	—
