= Mama (software) =

Programming language

- Mama development environment
- Original author(s): Eytam Computer Science
- Stable release: 1.5.2 / February 22, 2010
- Operating system: Windows
- Type: Educational programming language
- License: Freeware
- Website: eytam.com/mama

Mama is an object-oriented educational programming language designed to help young students start programming by providing all language elements in the student mother tongue. Mama programming language is available in several languages, with both left-to-right (LTR) and right-to-left (RTL) language direction support.

A new variant of Mama was built on top of Carnegie Mellon's Alice development environment, supporting scripting of the 3D stage objects. This new variant of Mama was designed to help young students start programming by building 3D animations and games.

== History ==
The first versions of Mama - 1.0, 1.1 and 1.2 - provided simple integrated development environment (IDE) which contained support to standard elements such as text editor with syntax highlighting, compiler, debugger, output window, etc. Starting at version 1.5, Mama was integrated with the open source Alice IDE to support drag and drop programming and 3D animating. Mama versions are implemented in Java.

The current release of Mama, version 1.5.4, is available both in English and in Hebrew, and it runs on Microsoft Windows.

== Design ==
Mama was designed to address the following problems in educational programming:

1. Industrial programming languages are designed to be usable for production code, thus introducing additional complexity. Mama is designed solely to teach programming concepts, providing simple and quick development of programs.
2. Syntax errors frustrate students when start learning programming - Mama's variant over Alice uses a drag and drop environment to create computer animations using 3D models.

Mama language is a pure object-oriented language, while the Alice IDE is object based. That implies that while writing textual scripts with Mama language supports all object oriented elements (inheritance, polymorphism, generic programming, Observer pattern style event handling), creating objects and methods with the drag and drop interface is object based - there is no inheritance (and thus no polymorphism). The last observation may confuse beginners - thus it is suggested to use Mama scripts only as advance topics in CS courses.

Mama 1.5 main improvements over Alice version 2.2:

- added Mama programming language as a (rich) scripting language - 3D scene objects can be manipulated using this scripting mechanism
- full Unicode support
- creation and editing of 3D objects
- support uploading movies to YouTube and publishing in Facebook
- support for scenery and characters
- tutorial editor tool for instructors
- movie export with audio
- user standalone executables
- better menu logic
- many bug fixes

== IDE Basics ==
There are several parts in IDE window: at the top you'll find the main menu and the toolbar, which let you execute commands such as create/open a worlds, import 3D objects into the world, create a standalone application, export the animation to YouTube, etc.

The five windows contained in the main window are:

- object tree - contains the object list in the current world.
- 3D window - this is where objects are positioned, moved, turned, etc.
- events area - lets you edit what happens upon occur of certain event.
- details area - contains information about the currently selected object in 3 tabs: properties, methods and functions.
- editor area (at the bottom) - that's where the program code is written, using drag and drop of instructions.

When in scene editing mode, two of the above parts are replaced:

- control panel - replaces the events area, and displays various controls that help manipulating objects in the 3D window.
- object gallery - replaces the editor area, and displays objects in hierarchic folders to be selected and embedded in the 3D window.

Following are the basic types available in Alice IDE:

- Number - a numeric type, represents both integers and reals
- Boolean - a boolean value, accepting either true or false
- Object - a general Mama object
- String - a string, a collection of characters
- Color - an RGB color
- TextureMap - a texture map
- Sound - a sound
- Pose - a captured pose of an object
- Position - a 3D array defining a position in the 3D space
- Orientation - a 3D array defining the orientation in the 3D space
- PointOfView - a combination of a Position and Orientation

The control instructions available in the bottom of the editor area are:

- doInOrder - execute a sequence of instructions sequentially
- doTogether - execute a sequence of instructions simultaneously
- if - execute a sequence of instructions sequentially only under a given condition
- while - execute a sequence of instructions sequentially while a given condition holds
- for - execute a sequence of instructions sequentially a given number of times
- forAllInOrder - execute a sequence of instructions sequentially iterating over the given collection
- forAllTogether - execute a sequence of instructions simultaneously iterating over the given collection
- wait - wait a given number of seconds
- print - print the given data to the output console
- assert - assert that a condition is true, display a message if the condition is false (new in Mama 1.5)
- Script - add a free Mama script to the program
- # - add a comment to the program

== See also ==
- Visual programming language
- Very high-level programming language
