= DiamondTouch =

Multiple person interface device

DiamondTouch Table

- Developers: Circle Twelve Inc, MERL
- Operating system: Microsoft Windows
- Website: http://www.circletwelve.com

The DiamondTouch table is a multi-touch, interactive PC interface product from Circle Twelve Inc. It is a human interface device that has the capability of allowing multiple people to interact simultaneously while identifying which person is touching where. The technology was originally developed at Mitsubishi Electric Research Laboratories (MERL) in 2001 and later licensed to Circle Twelve Inc in 2008. The DiamondTouch table is used to facilitate face-to-face collaboration, brainstorming, and decision-making, and users include construction management company Parsons Brinckerhoff, the Methodist Hospital, and the US National Geospatial-Intelligence Agency (NGA).

== Overview ==
The DiamondTouch table is a front-projected interactive display that allows up to four users to sit face to face and work together on the same screen. The DiamondTouch hardware enables a class of software known as "single-display groupware" where collaborative work is supported by computer interfaces that allow participants to be physically close. While product literature mentions consumer uses such as gaming, customers of the DiamondTouch are using it for business and office applications.

The principal feature that distinguishes the DiamondTouch table from other multi-touch interfaces, such as the Apple iPhone, HP TouchSmart, Microsoft Surface or do-it-yourself systems inspired by the work of Jeff Han, is that the DiamondTouch table can identify who is touching where. DiamondTouch achieves this feature through capacitive coupling between a transmitter array located in the touch surface and separate receivers located in the chair of each user.

The physical set-up of the system consists of the DiamondTouch device connected to a PC via USB cable, and a video projector suspended above the table and aimed down onto the touch surface. Cables connect chairs or receivers to the DiamondTouch unit. The current products have four receivers, thereby supporting one to four users.

A software development kit (SDK) allows developers to build custom software applications using standard programming languages including C, C++, Java, ActiveX (for C#, DHTML, VB.NET) and Adobe Flash. A mouse emulator enables the operation of common software applications using multi-touch gestures for mouse functions (left button, middle button, right button and scroll wheel). A multi-user annotation software tool allows users to make mark-ups, selecting pen types from a pallet.

In September 2008, Circle Twelve introduced a software extension for the geospatial information systems (GIS) software ArcView from ESRI. The software extension allows multi-user and multi-touch interactions in ArcView when used in conjunction with the DiamondTouch table.

== History ==
DiamondTouch technology was developed by Paul Dietz and Darren Leigh at MERL, and presented at the ACM Symposium on User Interface Software and Technology (UIST) in 2001. The hardware complimented other Human-Computer Interaction (HCI) research, including the Personal Digital Historian developed by Chia Shen and others at MERL, and led to developments in tabletop computing, shared display groupware, and touch-based interaction. While the traditional computer interfaces (consisting of a mouse, keyboard and monitor) were originally designed to support individuals, the focus was to create a new type of computer interface to support face-to-face collaboration among small groups of people.

In 2003, MERL started a university loan program in which DiamondTouch tables were provided to universities for research purposes, and tabletop computing research built around DiamondTouch began at research groups including Stanford University, Carnegie Mellon University, Georgia Institute of Technology, and University of Tokyo, leading to research papers presented at academic conferences including UIST, ACM Conference on Human Factors in Computing Systems (CHI), ACM Conference on Computer Supported Cooperative Work, and International Conference on Human-Computer Interaction (HCII). Research in the field led to the formation of the annual academic conference beginning in 2006 called Tabletop (initially, the IEEE International Workshop on Horizontal Interactive Human-Computer Systems or TableTop 2006, and most recently the ACM International Conference on Interactive Tabletops and Surfaces or Tabletop 2010).

DiamondTouch first appeared publicly at a cocktail reception at the 2004 Technology Entertainment Design (TED) conference and soon after that at the first NextFest sponsored by Wired Magazine. In 2006, MERL began selling the DiamondTouch table product commercially. In 2008, MERL licensed the DiamondTouch technology to Circle Twelve Inc, a company founded by MERL’s former VP of Business Development, Adam Bogue.

== Notable Research ==
- Researchers from Fondazione Bruno Kessler (FBK) developed a Collaborative Puzzle Game with the aim of fostering social interaction skills among children with Autism Spectrum Disorders. The work was presented at the 8th Annual International Meeting for Autism Research (IMFAR).
- A system for conflict negotiation and resolution between Palestinian and Israeli youths was designed in which face-to-face interaction was mediated by the DiamondTouch table. Research took place at University of Haifa and was presented at CHI 2008.
- A Shared Speech Interface was designed by researchers at UCSD to facilitate conversations between deaf and non-signing, hearing people. The work was presented at CSCW 2008.
- The use of multi-user tabletop interfaces in conjunction with vertical displays in operations centers like the New York City Police Department’s Real Time Crime Center was explored by researchers at University of Toronto and MERL.
- A study at University of Sussex focused on comparing multi-user interaction around vertical displays versus horizontal displays and found that horizontal displays were better for collaboration, concluding that users of horizontal displays "switched more between roles, explored more ideas and had a greater awareness of what each other was doing," while users of vertical displays "found it more difficult to collaborate."
- Recognizing that image orientation poses an interface issue with multi-user horizontal displays, researchers from MERL developed DiamondSpin, a java-based applications development framework." The DiamondSpin toolkit is available for download. http://diamondspin.free.fr/
- Researchers from University of South Australia developed a system for mapping the multi-user capabilities of DiamondTouch into the multi-window device support of the X Window System. The system, named Multi-Pointer X (MPX), works with operating systems such as Linux that support multiple pointing devices.
- Multi-modal interfaces that combine speech recognition and direct touch interactions were explored by researchers at University of Calgary and MERL, leading to applications that included an adaptation of WarCraft III on the DiamondTouch table.
- Issues of social protocol in multi-user tabletop computer systems were explored by researchers from Stanford, MERL and University of Paris, proposing paradigms for user interface design in shared display groupware.
- Researchers from MERL and University of Toronto developed user interface design principles for multi-touch screens, including the use of various hand postures in one and two-handed touch interaction concepts.
- Students from the University of Cambridge developed a multi-touch design application for Lego models.

== See also ==
- Microsoft PixelSense
- Perceptive Pixel
