= Really Achieving Your Childhood Dreams =

Viral video of a 2007 lecture by Randy Pausch

Poster advertising Pausch's lecture

"Really Achieving Your Childhood Dreams" (also called "The Last Lecture") was a lecture given by Carnegie Mellon University computer science professor Randy Pausch on September 18, 2007, that received widespread media coverage, and was the basis for The Last Lecture, a New York Times best-selling book co-authored with Wall Street Journal reporter Jeffrey Zaslow. Pausch had been diagnosed with pancreatic cancer in September 2006. On September 19, 2006, Pausch underwent a pancreaticoduodenectomy to remove the malignant tumor from his pancreas. In August 2007, doctors discovered that the cancer had recurred. Pausch was given a terminal diagnosis and told to expect that three to six months of good health remained.

The lecture was upbeat and humorous, alternating between wisecracks, insights on computer science and engineering education, advice on building multi-disciplinary collaborations, working together with other people, offering inspirational life lessons, and performing push-ups on stage. Pausch commented on the irony that the "Last Lecture" series had recently been renamed "Journeys": "I thought, damn, I finally nailed the venue and they renamed it." After Pausch finished his lecture, Steve Seabolt, on behalf of Electronic Arts, which was collaborating with CMU in the development of Alice 3.0, pledged to honor Pausch by creating a memorial scholarship for women in computer science, in recognition of Pausch's support and mentoring of women in CS and engineering.

Professor Pausch's "Last Lecture" has received attention and recognition both from American media and news sources worldwide. The video of the speech became an internet sensation, viewed over a million times within its first month on social networking sites such as YouTube, Google video, MySpace, and Facebook. Randy Pausch gave an abridged version of his speech on The Oprah Winfrey Show in October 2007. On April 9, 2008, the ABC network aired an hour-long Diane Sawyer feature on Pausch entitled "The Last Lecture: A Love Story For Your Life". Four days after his death from pancreatic cancer on July 25, 2008, ABC aired a tribute to Pausch, remembering his life and his famous lecture.

== Background ==
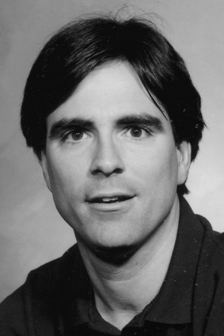
Randy Pausch

=== Previous lectures ===
Pausch was known for some previous lectures. He had been associate professor in the Department of Computer Science at the University of Virginia's School of Engineering and Applied Science in 1997 and 1998, and also worked for The Walt Disney Company as an imagineer and for Electronic Arts. At the University of Virginia, he gave a lecture on the importance of making technology more user friendly, in which he made his point by showing a VCR (video cassette recorder) that was hard to program and then smashing it with a sledgehammer. He was also known for a lecture on time management which he delivered in 1998 at the University of Virginia, and again in 2007.

"Really Achieving Your Childhood Dreams" was the first lecture of the nine part "Journeys" series presented by Carnegie Mellon, which included speakers Raj Reddy, Jay Apt, and Jared Cohon, the university president at the time. The lecture series focused on university staff members' professional journeys and the decisions and challenges they faced.

=== Terminal cancer ===
Pausch was a pancreatic cancer patient when he gave the lecture. In an interview, Pausch stated that he had felt bloated, and discovered that he had a cancerous tumor when doctors performed a CT Scan to check for gallstones. He underwent pancreaticoduodenectomy surgery (the "Whipple procedure") to remove the cancerous tumor, which later proved unsuccessful. The doctors removed his gall bladder, parts of his small intestine, a third of his pancreas, and part of his stomach, and then initiated experimental radiation treatment that could possibly increase his chance of surviving 5 years, to 45 percent. Pausch had radiation treatments from November 2006 to May 2007, and felt healthy after finishing. In July and August, tests at Johns Hopkins University found no cancer. However, in late August, Pausch informed readers of his website that his cancer had returned, saying: "A recent CT scan showed that there are 10 tumors in my liver, and my spleen is also peppered with small tumors. The doctors say that it is one of the most aggressive recurrences they have ever seen." The doctors estimated Pausch had three to six months of good health left.

Pausch based the lecture on the generic "Last Lecture" given by some professors, imagining what one would say and what one would want their legacy to be if they could have one last chance to share their knowledge with the world. Carnegie Mellon had previously had a lecture series titled the "Last Lecture", but had renamed it to "Journeys", and asked staff to talk about their professional experiences. Pausch was offered the lecture around the time when he was diagnosed with pancreatic cancer, and had received news that he only had months left to live. Pausch nearly cancelled the lecture due to his disease, but discussed the offer with his wife and decided to accept the opportunity to share his thoughts with the world. Pausch compared it to the final scene of The Natural, in which the character Roy Hobbs overcomes injury and old age to hit one final home run.

=== Speech inspiration ===
Before Pausch was diagnosed with pancreatic cancer, he had planned to base his lecture on the generic academic "Last Lecture", but he could not think of a subject. He was constantly being e-mailed by speech and event organizers at Carnegie Mellon. Pausch was told in August, a month before the lecture, that a poster must be printed and he needed to choose a subject immediately. The same week, he was told that the prognosis for his pancreatic cancer was terminal. Pausch nearly canceled the lecture. He had to decide whether to make the speech, or to stay home to prepare his family for life without him. His wife Jai requested that Pausch stay at home. She wanted Pausch to be spending more time with their three children, instead of giving a speech at his workplace. Pausch decided on the speech, explaining that his children would remember him through seeing his lecture.

== Speech ==
"Really Achieving Your Childhood Dreams" was delivered on September 18, 2007, at Carnegie Mellon University's McConomy Auditorium. Over 450 Carnegie Mellon students, staff members, and friends of Pausch attended the lecture, leaving standing room only. Pausch later commented in an interview, "A couple of hundred people in a room, looking and listening and laughing and applauding – hopefully at the appropriate times – that gives a lot of validation to my kids that a lot of people believe in this, and a lot of people who knew me believe that I did my best to try to live this way." The introduction to the lecture series was given by Indira Nair, the Vice Provost for Education at Carnegie Mellon. Nair explained the series was called "Journeys", in which eight more professors from Carnegie Mellon would share their insights over the years.

Pausch was introduced by Steve Seabolt, the Vice President of Worldwide Publishing and Marketing at Electronic Arts, as well as Pausch's close friend and former co-worker. Seabolt began with a joke about Electronic Arts, and another joke about a bet he and Pausch had made about how many people would attend the lecture, saying that "...depending upon whose version of the story you hear, he either owes me 20 dollars or his new Volkswagen." Seabolt next talked about Pausch's academic achievements and previous career with the University of Virginia and Electronic Arts. Seabolt concluded his introduction by describing Pausch, saying that "Randy's dedication to making the world a better place is self evident to anyone who has crossed paths with him." He described how his accomplishments had affected others, as well as his wife and three children. Seabolt then turned the speech over to Pausch, who was greeted with a standing ovation.

As Pausch walked on, he tried to stop the applause and get the audience to sit down, and begin the speech by commenting "make me earn it", to which one member of the audience responded "you did". He then commented on the irony of his "last lecture" in a series that used to be the "Last Lecture" series, but was renamed "Journeys": "It's wonderful to be here. What Indira didn’t tell you is that this lecture series used to be called the 'Last Lecture'. If you had one last lecture to give before you died, what would it be? I thought, damn, I finally nailed the venue and they renamed it."

Pausch explained having pancreatic cancer and only having 3 to 6 months to live, but joked that he was in the best shape of his life (and "better than most of you [the audience]"), proceeding to do a series of push-ups on stage while speaking. Pausch said what he would not cover in the lecture, which included his family and children, religion, spirituality, and his terminal cancer or any other cancer.

=== Pausch's childhood dreams ===
Pausch went on to explain his childhood dreams and how he accomplished (or tried to accomplish) them. Pausch described his childhood and family life in the 1960s. Pausch said that he had a "really good childhood", and, when going back through his family photographs, had not found a picture of him not smiling. Some of the pictures were projected as slides, including one of him dreaming. He explained how he was inspired by the Apollo 11 lunar landing in 1969. Pausch then transitioned to a slide which contained a list of his childhood dreams. They were: being in zero gravity, playing in the National Football League, being the author of a World Book Encyclopedia article, being Captain Kirk, being "one of the guys who won the big stuffed animals in the amusement park", and becoming a Disney Imagineer.

Pausch explained his dream of being in zero gravity. As a child, this had been inspired by Apollo 11, and had stayed with him as an adult. When he was the computer science professor at Carnegie Mellon, he learned of a NASA program that allows college students to fly in NASA's vomit comet, which uses parabolic arcs to experience near-weightlessness. Faculty members were not allowed to go (Pausch called this a "brick wall" he faced), so he presented himself as a web journalist, because local media were allowed. Pausch proceeded to talk about his second childhood dream, playing in the National Football League. Although Pausch was never a player in the National Football League, he spoke about his childhood experiences with Pop Warner Football and how they had affected his life and taught him lessons. Pausch then moved on to his dream of publishing an article in the World Book Encyclopedia. As a child, Pausch always kept and read a World Book Encyclopedia at home. As he progressed in his career, he became a leading expert in the field of virtual reality. World Book contacted Pausch, interested in him writing for the encyclopedia. As of 2008, the article "virtual reality" in the World Book Encyclopedia is the one authored by Pausch.

Next, Pausch explained his dream of being like Captain Kirk from the Star Trek series, with the slide showing "~~Being like~~ Meeting Captain Kirk". Pausch explained that he realized that there were some things he just could not do, and that was one of them. He eventually changed the goal into meeting William Shatner, the actor who played Captain Kirk. Shatner had written a book on the science of Star Trek, and had gone to Pausch for help with the virtual reality section of the book. Pausch met and worked with Shatner for this purpose. Pausch concluded the section with the story of his becoming an Imagineer at Disney, as well as his achieving the goal of "being one of those guys who wins stuffed animals", at a carnival with his wife and children.

=== Enabling the dreams of others ===
After relating his childhood dreams, Pausch began the second part of his speech, about how he enabled the dreams of others. He decided to become a professor, and reflected that there was no better job to enable the childhood dreams of others. He mentioned that working for Electronic Arts was "probably a close second". Pausch told the audience that he realized he could enable the dreams of others from Tommy Burnett, one of his students at the University of Virginia. Burnett was interested in joining Pausch's research group. Pausch asked Burnett what his childhood dream was, and he responded that his dream was to work on the next Star Wars film. Burnett worked on Pausch's virtual reality team while at the University of Virginia, and Pausch helped Burnett to achieve his dream. When Pausch moved to Carnegie Mellon, his entire team moved with him except Burnett, who had been offered a job by Lucasfilm (the creator of Star Wars). He eventually worked with Lucasfilm on three Star Wars films: The Phantom Menace, Attack of the Clones, and Revenge of the Sith.

This led Pausch to teach a virtual reality class at Carnegie Mellon, to help them realize their childhood dreams. In the course, 50 students from the university were separated into random teams of four which were each assigned a project to build a virtual world. Each group had two weeks to work on the project, and then presented it to the group. The teams were then reshuffled and a new project began. The project evolved to draw an audience, and helped his students realize their potential. Finally, Pausch gave a few words of advice on how others could achieve their childhood dreams, and who his role models were.

=== Conclusion ===
After Pausch finished his lecture, Steve Seabolt, on behalf of Electronic Arts, which collaborated with Carnegie Mellon in the development of Alice 3.0, pledged to honor Pausch by creating a memorial scholarship for women in computer science in recognition of Pausch's support and mentoring of women in CS and engineering. University president Jared Cohon called his contributions to the university and to education "remarkable and stunning". He then announced that Carnegie Mellon would build a pedestrian bridge named for Pausch in honor of his contributions to the university and to the world. The bridge connected Carnegie Mellon's new Computer Science building and the Center for the Arts, a symbol of the way Pausch linked those two areas. Finally, Brown University professor Andries van Dam followed Pausch's last lecture with a tearful and impassioned speech praising him for his courage and leadership, calling him a role model.

== Post-speech media coverage ==
Pausch was named "Person of the Week" on ABC's World News with Charles Gibson on September 21. His "Last Lecture" attracted wide attention on international media, became an internet hit, and was viewed over a million times within its first month. On October 22, 2007, Pausch appeared on The Oprah Winfrey Show, where he discussed his diagnosis and recapped his "Last Lecture" for millions of TV viewers.

On October 6, 2007, Pausch joined the Pittsburgh Steelers for their regular practice, after the organization learned that one of his childhood dreams mentioned in his "Last Lecture" was to play in the National Football League. A devoted Star Trek fan, Pausch was invited by film director J. J. Abrams to film a scene in the latest Star Trek movie. Abrams heard of Pausch's disease and sent a personal e-mail inviting Pausch to the set. Pausch happily accepted and traveled to Los Angeles, California to shoot the scene. In his appearance he was given a line of dialogue and donated his $217.06 paycheck to charity. On April 9, 2008, the ABC network aired an hour-long Diane Sawyer feature on Pausch entitled "The Last Lecture: A Love Story For Your Life". On July 29, 2008, ABC aired a follow-up to the Last Lecture special, memorializing Pausch.

== Book ==
The Last Lecture, a book that Pausch and Jeff Zaslow, a Wall Street Journal reporter, wrote about the lecture.

The Disney-owned publisher Hyperion paid $6.7 million for the rights to publish a book about Pausch called The Last Lecture, co-authored by Pausch and Wall Street Journal reporter Jeffrey Zaslow. The Last Lecture explained Pausch's speech, and the events that led up to it. According to Robert Miller, a publisher for Hyperion Books, the book would "flesh out his speech" and show others "how to deal with mortality" and how to live well while death is imminent. The book was well-received, eventually earning the number one spot on the New York Times bestseller list in the "Advice" category during the week of June 22, 2008. The book remained on the New York Times bestseller list for 80 straight weeks.
