= Multi-Pointer X =

Multi-pointer X (MPX) is a part of X input extension and previously a modification to the existing X.Org implementation of the X Window System. MPX provides multiple independent pointers at the windowing system level. These pointers are all connected to one computer. Unlike many other multi-pointer applications and toolkits, MPX allows many existing X11 applications to run unmodified, whilst still providing additional input features. For instance, multiple users can simultaneously operate different applications at the same time. Some applications do not work as expected due to limitations in the toolkits they use. The limitations are caused by the assumption that only one pointer exists.

== Window manager ==
Combined with the proof of concept window manager MPWM, MPX provides extended features such as simultaneous movement or resizing of application windows, per pointer annotation over top of an application and restricted input support (floor control). Applications that are aware of the extra pointers are also able to make use of them, such as two handed drawing.

== History ==
MPX was created by Peter Hutterer in 2005–2008, as part of his PhD in the Wearable Computer Lab under the supervision of Prof. Bruce H. Thomas at the University of South Australia.

MPX was merged into the current development version of X.Org on 26 May 2008.

Xinput2 (XI2), which is the second official stable API release of the X input extension, contains MPX and was merged into the current development version of X.Org on 3 June 2009, and released as part of the XServer 1.7 on 2 October 2009.

== See also ==
- DiamondTouch
- Multi-touch
- Multiseat
