= Desney Tan =

Singaporean computer scientist (born 1976)

Desney S Tan
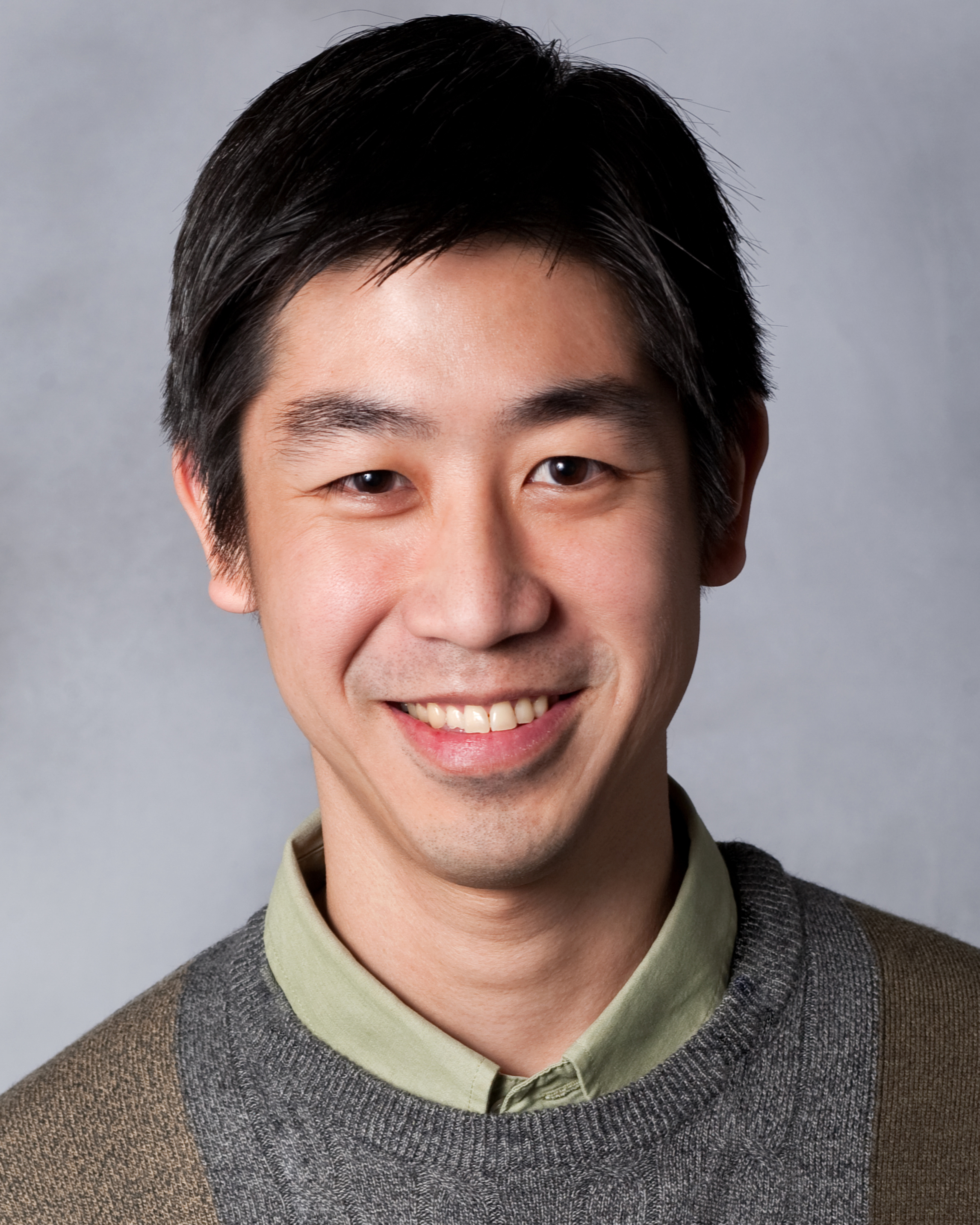
- Born: 1976 (age 49–50); Singapore
- Education: Carnegie Mellon University; University of Notre Dame
- Awards: TR35 (2007)
- Scientific career
- Fields: Computer science Human-Computer Interaction; Healthcare; Life Sciences
- Workplaces: Microsoft Research
- Doctoral advisor: Randy Pausch

Desney Tan is corporate vice president and managing director of Microsoft Research Redmond, a multidisciplinary global organization working to create scientific knowledge and deliver innovation that leads to positive human impact at scale. He was previously Vice President and Managing Director of Microsoft Health Futures, a cross-organizational incubation group that serves as Microsoft’s Health and Life Science “moonshot factory.” He also holds an affiliate faculty appointment in the Department of Computer Science and Engineering at the University of Washington, serves on the Board of Directors for ResMed (NYSE: RMD, ASX: RMD), is senior advisor and chief technologist for Seattle-based life science incubator IntuitiveX, advises multiple startup companies (e.g. Proprio Vision), and is an active startup and real estate investor.

Tan was recipient of a National Science and Technology Board (NTSB) Fellowship in 2001, an Agency for Science, Technology, and Research (formerly NTSB) Fellowship in 2002, and a Microsoft Research Fellowship in 2003. He was honored as one of MIT Technology Review's 2007 Young Innovators Under 35 (TR35) in 2007 for his work on Brain Computer Interfaces. He was also named one of SciFi Channel's Young Visionaries at TED 2009, as well as Forbes' Revolutionaries: Radical Thinkers and their World-Changing Ideas for his work on Whole Body Computing. He was the Technical Program Chair of the prestigious ACM SIGCHI Conference in 2008 and General Chair in 2011. His research interests primarily focus on Human-Computer Interaction, Physiological Computing, and Healthcare.

== Biography ==
Tan was born and grew up in Singapore. He moved to the United States for high school and received his Bachelor of Science in Computer Engineering from the University of Notre Dame in 1996. He later attended Carnegie Mellon University, where he earned his PhD in Computer Science in 2004 under the supervision of Randy Pausch, popularly known for delivering "The Last Lecture: Really Achieving Your Childhood Dreams" after being diagnosed with terminal pancreatic cancer.

== Work ==
Tan began his academic career working on robotic path planning, and eventually moved into augmented and virtual reality as well as large display and multiple device user experiences. His PhD dissertation demonstrated the cognitive and social effects of display size, irrespective of the field of view. He is perhaps most well known for his work utilizing bio-sensing to create novel forms of human-computer interfaces. This includes work on: brain-computer interfaces, muscle-computer interfaces, tongue-computer interfaces, bio-acoustic sensing (e.g. in the Skinput project), using the body as an antenna (e.g. in the Humantenna project), as well as work on bionic contact lenses.

He has led partnerships with enterprises like Adaptive Biotechnologies (seeking to develop a universal blood-based diagnostic) as well as Verily Life Sciences and the Broad Institute (to develop and deploy the Terra.bio platform).

Tan has published over 100 technical papers in various domains, and holds more than 100 associated patents.
