= Src:Card =

Card game

Src:Card is a 1–2 player card game where players attempt to defeat the robotic core of an opponent's battle robot by writing code. The game is designed around a rudimentary Src:Card programming language which encapsulates much of imperative procedural programming based on academic research developed at the University of Auckland and Otago. The game's language replicates conditional flow, loops, and other control structures as well as basic algorithmic logic. While it contains many of the hallmarks of a Turing complete language (such as conditional branching) the game would require a larger function set to qualify as a Turing complete imperative language.

Launched in 2015, the card game was one of Malaysia's first successful Kickstarter project. The game has received press coverage from most board gaming news outlets. The game is currently being extensively used by Malaysian Coder Dojos to teach basic programming. Src:Card is currently a free and open download. Players can print and play Src:Card and use open assets to modify the game.
