= Chris Harrison (computer scientist) =

American computer scientist

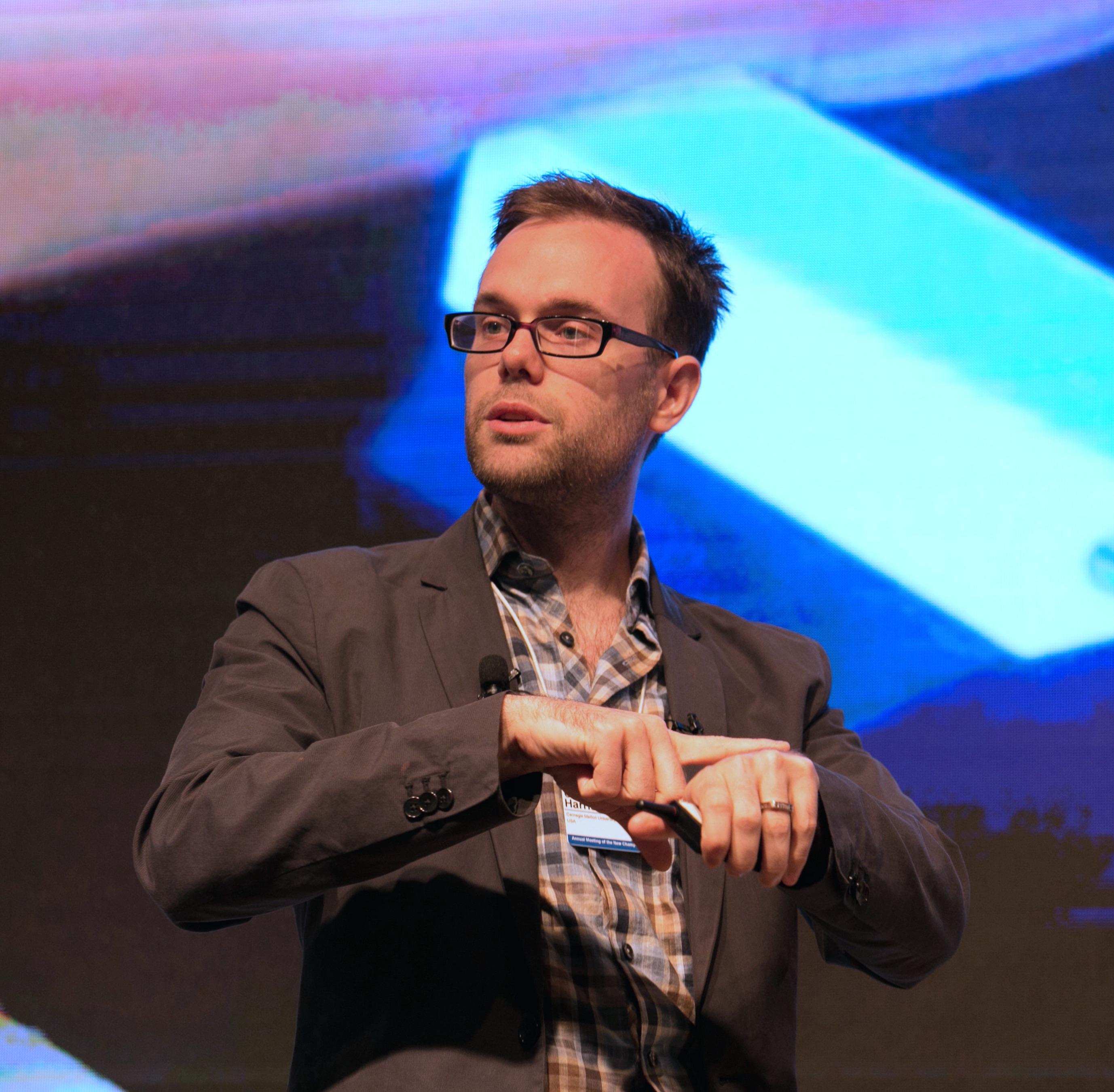
- Born: May 21, 1984 (age 42); London, United Kingdom
- Citizenship: United States; United Kingdom
- Education: New York University (B.A., M.S.), Carnegie Mellon University (Ph.D.)
- Known for: Omnitouch, Skinput
- Awards: Packard Fellow, Sloan Fellow, World Economic Forum Young Scientist, Forbes 30 Under 30 Scientist, TR35 Award, Qualcomm Innovation Fellowship
- Scientific career
- Fields: Human–computer interaction, Wearable computing
- Workplaces: Carnegie Mellon University
- Thesis: The Human Body as an Interactive Computing Platform (2013)
- Doctoral advisor: Scott Hudson
- Website: chrisharrison.net

Chris Harrison is a British-born, American computer scientist and entrepreneur, working in the fields of human–computer interaction, machine learning and sensor-driven interactive systems. He is a professor at Carnegie Mellon University and director of the Future Interfaces Group within the Human–Computer Interaction Institute. He has previously conducted research at AT&T Labs, Microsoft Research, IBM Research and Disney Research. He is also the CTO and co-founder of Qeexo, a machine learning and interaction technology startup.

Harrison has authored more than 80 peer-reviewed papers and his work appears in more than 40 books. For his contributions in human–computer interaction, Harrison was named a top 35 innovator under 35 by MIT Technology Review (2012), a top 30 scientist under 30 by Forbes (2012), one of six innovators to watch by Smithsonian (2013), and a top Young Scientist by the World Economic Forum (2014). Over the course of his career, Harrison has been awarded fellowships by the Packard Foundation, Sloan Foundation, Google, Qualcomm and Microsoft Research. He currently holds the A. Nico Habermann Chair in Computer Science. More recently, NYU, Harrison's undergraduate alma mater named him as their 2014 Distinguished Young Alumnus, and the lab also won a Fast Company Innovation by Design Award for their work on EM-Sense.

== Biography ==
Harrison was born in 1984 in London, United Kingdom, but emigrated with his family to New York City in the United States as a child. Harrison participated in the ACM programming competitions and engaged in crafts. He also displayed an interest in Slinging and was contacted for this hobby by BBC for an ancient weapons documentary. Consequently, Harrison created and launched slinging.org on March 20, 2003 as an online forum for sling enthusiasts, as is currently the largest website on the subject, with over 200,000 forum posts. Harrison obtained his citizenship in the United States on May 13, 2002.

Harrison obtained both a B.A. (2002–2005) and M.S. (2006) in Computer Science from the Courant Institute of Mathematical Sciences at New York University. His Master's thesis was advised by Dr. Dennis Shasha, with whom he worked on a relational file system built around the concept of temporal context. New York University honored Harrison as its 2014 Distinguished Young Alumnus.

During his master's studies, Harrison worked at IBM Research - Almaden on an early personal assistant application called Enki under Mark Dean, then the director of the lab. After completing his master's degree, Harrison worked at AT&T Labs, developing among the first asynchronous social video platforms, dubbed CollaboraTV, with features now common in modern systems. Encouraged by colleagues, Harrison joined the Ph.D. program in Human–Computer Interaction at Carnegie Mellon University in 2007, completing his dissertation on "The Human Body as an Interactive Computing Platform" in 2013 under the supervision of Dr. Scott Hudson.

From 2009 to 2012, Harrison was the Editor-in-Chief of ACM's Crossroads magazine, which he relaunched as XRDS, the flagship magazine for the over 30,000 student members of the ACM. Harrison has spun-out several technologies from CMU and cofounded the machine learning startup Qeexo in 2012, which provides specialized machine-learning engines for mobile and embedded platforms, with a focus on interactive technologies. In 2019, the company won a CES Innovation Award for their EarSense solution, which was used in the bezel-less Oppo Find X, replacing the need for a physical proximity sensor with a virtual machine-learning-powered solution. In total, the company software is used on more than 100 million devices as of 2017.

In 2013, Harrison became faculty at Carnegie Mellon University, founding the Future Interfaces Group within the Human–Computer Interaction Institute.

== Research ==
Harrison broadly investigates novel sensing and interface technologies, especially those "that empower people to interact with small devices in big ways". He is best known for his research into ubiquitous and wearable computing, where computation escapes the confines of today's small, rectangular screens, and spills interactivity out onto everyday surfaces, such as walls, countertops and furniture. This research thread dates back to 2008, starting with Scratch Input appropriating walls and tables as ad hoc input surfaces. Insights from this work, especially the vibroacoustic propagation of touch inputs, led to Skinput being developed while Harrison was interning at Microsoft Research. Skinput was the first on-body system to demonstrate touch input and coordinated projected graphics without the need to instrument the hands. This research was followed shortly after by OmniTouch, also at Microsoft Research.

More recently, Harrison has been conducting research at the Future Interfaces Group in the Human Computer Interaction department of CMU. In 2016, Harrison presented 3 topics at the ACM Symposium on User Interface Software and Technology (UIST) through Future Interfaces Group. These topics were: using a high speed mode of a smartwatch's accelerometer to acquire and interpret acoustic samples at 4000 samples per second, using electrical impedance sensing to create a real-time hand gesture sensor, and using infrared sensors on a smartwatch to recognize and utilize hand gestures made on the skin directly around the smartwatch. In 2017, Robert Xiao, an HCII PhD student, along with Harrison and Scott Hudson, his advisors, created Desktopography, an interactive multi-touch interface that is projected onto a desktop surface. Inspired by the Xerox PARC DigitalDesk, one of the first digitally augmented desks of its time, Desktopography explores the possibilities of virtual-physical interactions and deals with how to best create a user-friendly interface which has to navigate around various, constantly moved objects, as commonly found on one's desktop surface.

== Other activities ==
Harrison co-developed and co-wrote Crash Course Computer Science, a PBS Digital Studios-funded educational series hosted on YouTube, with his partner, Amy Ogan. This project was initiated following a discussion between Harrison and John Green at the World Economic Forum in 2016, where both were guest speakers.

Along with Robert Xiao and Scott Hudson, colleagues at CMU, he developed Lumitrack, a motion tracking technology which is currently used in video game controllers and in the film industry.

Harrison was also one of the Program Committee Chairs for the 2017 ACM Symposium on User Interface Software and Technology (UIST).

Chris is also an amateur digital artist and sculptor. His artworks have appeared in over 40 books and more than a dozen international galleries. Notable among these appearances were showings at the Triennale di Milano in Milan, Italy (2014), and the Biennale Internationale Design in Saint-Étienne, France (2010).
