= Ariel Shamir =

Israeli professor of Computer Science

- אריאל שמיר
- Born: 1966 (age 59–60); Jerusalem
- Education: Hebrew University of Jerusalem
- Occupation: Academic
- Title: Dean of the Efi Arazi School of Computer Science
- Website: faculty.idc.ac.il/arik/

Ariel Shamir (Hebrew: אריאל שמיר) is an Israeli professor of Computer Science.

He serves as dean of the Efi Arazi School of Computer Science at the IDC Herzliya. and one of the developers of Seam carving.

== Biography ==
Shamir received a bachelor's and master's degree in mathematics and computer science from the Hebrew University of Jerusalem and a doctorate in computer science in 2000. He specialized mainly in computerized image and video processing, imaging and machine learning.

He did his postdoctoral fellowship at the Center for Computational Imaging at the University of Texas at Austin and then researched at Mitsubishi Electric's research laboratories at Cambridge, Disney Research and MIT.

In 2017, he started serving as a dean of the Efi Arazi School of Computer Science at the IDC Herzliya.

Shamir has published dozens of publications on his research topics, and in 2014 he was mentioned as one of the most cited and influential researchers in the field of computer science. Since 2017, Shamir has been an associate editor of several journals like IEEE Transactions on Visualization and Computer Graphics and ACM Transactions on Graphics.

As of 2021, Shamir's research has been cited over 11,000 times in academic papers worldwide.
