= Randy Pausch =

American computer science professor (1960–2008)

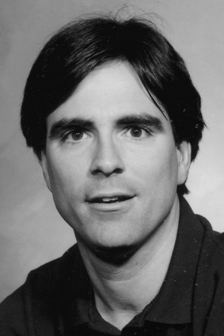
- Born: Randolph Frederick Pausch; October 23, 1960; Baltimore, Maryland, US
- Died: July 25, 2008 (aged 47); Chesapeake, Virginia, US
- Cause of death: Pancreatic cancer
- Alma mater: Brown University (BS); Carnegie Mellon University (PhD)
- Known for: Creator of Alice software project Cofounder of the Entertainment Technology Center; Virtual reality The Last Lecture
- Spouse: Jai Glasgow
- Children: 3
- Awards: Karl V. Karlstrom Outstanding Educator Award; ACM Special Interest Group on Computer Science Education; Award for Outstanding Contributions to Computer Science Education; Fellow of the ACM; Time's Time 100
- Scientific career
- Fields: Computer science Human–computer interaction
- Workplaces: Carnegie Mellon University; University of Virginia
- Doctoral advisor: Alfred Spector
- Doctoral students: Ken Hinckley, Desney Tan

Randolph Frederick Pausch (/paʊʃ/) (October 23, 1960 – July 25, 2008) was an American educator, a professor of computer science, human–computer interaction, and design at Carnegie Mellon University (CMU) in Pittsburgh, Pennsylvania.

Pausch learned he had pancreatic cancer in September 2006. In August 2007, he was given a terminal diagnosis: "three to six months of good health left". He gave an upbeat lecture titled, "The Last Lecture: Really Achieving Your Childhood Dreams" on September 18, 2007 at Carnegie Mellon, which became a popular YouTube video and led to other media appearances. He co-authored a book of the same name, The Last Lecture, which became a New York Times best-seller.

Pausch's academic lectures reached a global audience after his diagnosis with a terminal illness in 2006. Pausch died of complications from pancreatic cancer on July 25, 2008, aged 47.

== Early life ==
Randolph Frederick Pausch was born in Baltimore, Maryland, and grew up in Columbia, Maryland. After graduating from Oakland Mills High School in Columbia, Pausch earned his bachelor's degree in computer science from Brown University in May 1982 and his PhD in computer science from Carnegie Mellon University in August 1988. While completing his doctoral studies, Pausch was briefly employed at Xerox Palo Alto Research Center and Adobe Systems.

== Computer science career ==
Pausch was an assistant and associate professor in the Department of Computer Science at the University of Virginia's School of Engineering and Applied Science from 1988 until 1997. While there, in 1995, he completed sabbaticals at Walt Disney Imagineering and Electronic Arts (EA). In 1997, Pausch became Associate Professor of Computer Science, Human-Computer Interaction, and Design at Carnegie Mellon University. In 1998, he was a co-founder, along with Donald Marinelli, of CMU's Entertainment Technology Center (ETC), and he began the Building Virtual Worlds course at CMU, which he taught for 10 years. He consulted with Google on user interface design and also consulted with PARC, Imagineering, and Media Metrix. Pausch is also the founder of the Alice software project. He received the National Science Foundation Presidential Young Investigator Award and was a Lilly Foundation Teaching Fellow. Pausch was the author or co-author of five books and over 70 articles. Pausch received two awards from ACM in 2007 for his achievements in computing education: the Karl V. Karlstrom Outstanding Educator Award and the ACM Special Interest Group on Computer Science Education Award for Outstanding Contributions to Computer Science Education.

== "Really Achieving Your Childhood Dreams" ==
Pausch delivered his "Last Lecture", titled "Really Achieving Your Childhood Dreams", at CMU on September 18, 2007. He gave an abridged version of his speech on The Oprah Winfrey Show in October 2007. The talk was modeled after an ongoing series of lectures where top academics are asked to think deeply about what matters to them, and then give a hypothetical "final talk", with a topic such as "what wisdom would you try to impart to the world if you knew it was your last chance?" Before speaking, Pausch received a long standing ovation from a large crowd of over 400 colleagues and students. When he motioned them to sit down, saying, "Make me earn it", someone in the audience shouted back, "You did!"

During the lecture, Pausch offered inspirational life lessons, and performed push-ups on stage. He also commented on the irony that the "Last Lecture" series had recently been renamed as "Journeys", saying, "I thought, damn, I finally nailed the venue and they renamed it." After Pausch finished his lecture, Steve Seabolt, on behalf of Electronic Arts—which now collaborates with CMU in the development of Alice 3.0—pledged to honor Pausch by creating a memorial scholarship for women in computer science, in recognition of Pausch's support and mentoring of women in CS and engineering.

CMU president Jared Cohon spoke emotionally of Pausch's humanity and called his contributions to the university and to education "remarkable and stunning". He then announced that CMU will celebrate Pausch's impact on the world by building and naming after Pausch a raised pedestrian bridge to connect CMU's new Computer Science building and the Center for the Arts, symbolizing the way Pausch linked those two disciplines. Brown University professor Andries van Dam followed Pausch's last lecture with a tearful and impassioned speech praising him for his courage and leadership, calling him a role model.

=== The Last Lecture ===
Then-Disney-owned publisher Hyperion paid $6.7 million for the rights to publish a book about Pausch called The Last Lecture, co-authored by Pausch and Wall Street Journal reporter Jeffrey Zaslow. The book became a New York Times best-seller on April 28, 2008. The Last Lecture expands on Pausch's speech. The book's first printing had 400,000 copies, and it has been translated into 46 languages. It has spent more than 85 weeks on the New York Times bestseller list, and there are now more than 4.5 million copies in print in the U.S. alone. Despite speculation that the book would be made into a movie, Pausch denied these rumors, stating that "there's a reason to do the book, but if it's telling the story of the lecture in the medium of film, we already have that."

=== Media coverage ===
Pausch was named "Person of the Week" on ABC's World News with Charles Gibson on September 21, 2007. His "Last Lecture" attracted wide attention from the international media, became an Internet hit, and was viewed over a million times in the first month after its delivery. On October 22, 2007, Pausch appeared on The Oprah Winfrey Show where he discussed his situation and summarized his "Last Lecture". On October 6, 2007, Pausch joined the Pittsburgh Steelers for the day during their regular practice, after the organization learned that one of his childhood dreams mentioned in his "Last Lecture" was to play in the NFL. On April 9, 2008, the ABC network aired an hour-long Diane Sawyer feature on Pausch titled "The Last Lecture: A Love Story For Your Life". On July 29, 2008, ABC aired a follow-up to the Last Lecture special, remembering Pausch and his famous lecture.

=== Other lectures and appearances ===
Pausch gave a lecture about time management on November 27, 2007, at the University of Virginia, to an audience of over 850 people. In March 2008, Pausch appeared in a public service announcement video and testified before Congress in support of cancer research. On May 18, 2008, Pausch made a surprise return appearance at Carnegie Mellon, giving a speech at the commencement ceremony, as well as attending the School of Computer Science's diploma ceremony, and on May 19 Pausch appeared on the show Good Morning America. His lecture, "Really Achieving Your Childhood Dreams", was nominated at the 2007 YouTube Video Awards.

A devoted Star Trek fan, Pausch was invited by film director J. J. Abrams to film a role in Star Trek. Abrams heard of Pausch's condition and sent a personal e-mail inviting Pausch to the set. Pausch accepted and traveled to Los Angeles, California, to shoot his scene. In addition to appearing in the film, he also has a line of dialogue at the beginning of the film ("Captain, we have visual.") and donated the $217.06 paycheck to charity.

== Cancer and death ==
Pausch was diagnosed with pancreatic cancer and underwent a Whipple procedure (pancreaticoduodenectomy) on September 19, 2006, in an attempt to halt the disease. He was told in August 2007 to expect three to six months of good health remaining. He moved his family to Chesapeake, Virginia, to be close to his wife's family. On March 13, 2008, Pausch advocated for more federal funding for pancreatic cancer before the United States Senate Appropriations Subcommittee on Labor, Health and Human Services, Education, and Related Agencies. In the week prior to his testimony, he had been hospitalized for needle aspiration of pleural effusion in his right lung.

On May 2, 2008, a positron emission tomography (PET) scan showed that he had tiny (5 millimetres (0.20 in) or less) metastases in his lungs and in some of the lymph nodes in his chest. He also had metastases in his peritoneal and retroperitoneal cavities. On June 26, 2008, Pausch announced that he was considering halting chemotherapy due to its potential adverse side effects. He was, however, considering some immuno-therapy-based approaches. On July 24, on behalf of Pausch, a friend anonymously posted a message on Pausch's webpage stating that a biopsy had revealed that the cancer had progressed farther than recent PET scans showed, and that Pausch had "taken a step down" and was "much sicker than he had been". The friend also stated that Pausch had enrolled in a hospice program for end of life palliative care.

Pausch died from pancreatic cancer at his family's home in Chesapeake, Virginia, on July 25, 2008, at the age of 47.

On October 30, 2009, The Randy Pausch Memorial Footbridge was dedicated in a ribbon-cutting ceremony led by Pausch's wife Jai and their three children Dylan, Logan, and Chloe.

Jai Pausch published a memoir in 2012, Dream New Dreams: Reimagining My Life After Loss, where she recounted Randy's life and her time as his caretaker in his last years.

== Honors ==
- The Pittsburgh City Council declared November 19, 2007 to be "Dr. Randy Pausch Day".
- In May 2008, Pausch was listed by Time as one of the World's Top-100 Most Influential People.
- Randy was named Pittsburgher of the Year 2008.
- On May 30, 2008, Randy received a letter from then-President George W. Bush thanking him for his commitment to the Nation's youth.
- On February 4, 2009, The Walt Disney Company dedicated a tribute plaque at Walt Disney World near the "Mad Tea Party" attraction with a quote by Randy that reads "Be good at something; it makes you valuable ... Have something to bring to the table, because that will make you more welcome."
- The Walt Disney Company also created the Disney Memorial Pausch Fellowship at Carnegie Mellon University, which will support two graduate students.
- Per Jared Cohon's announcement on the day of the Last Lecture, a raised pedestrian bridge at CMU that connects the Gates Computer Science building and the Purnell Center for the Arts is named after Pausch, symbolizing the way he linked the two disciplines.

== Other publications ==
- Adding input and output to the transactional model (Research paper, CMU), 1988
- Dann, Wanda P.; Cooper, Stephen; Pausch, Randy (July 25, 2005). Learning to Program with Alice. Prentice Hall. ISBN 0-13-187289-3.
