= Robert Mehrabian =

American academic administrator

Robert Mehrabian (Armenian: Ռոբերտ Մեհրաբյան) is an Armenian-American materials scientist and the executive chairman of Teledyne Technologies Incorporated. He assumed this position on January 1, 2019. He was chairman, president, and chief executive officer of the company from 2000 to December 31, 2018, and president and a chief executive officer from 1999 to 2000. Mehrabian held various senior executive positions at Allegheny Teledyne Incorporated (ATI) starting in July 1997 before the spin-off of Teledyne Technologies Incorporated in November 1999. Previously he was president of Carnegie Mellon University from 1990 to 1997. He has served on the board of directors of several public companies, including Mellon Financial Corporation and its successor, Bank of New York Mellon (1994–2011) and PPG Industries (1992–2014).

Mehrabian graduated from Phillips Exeter Academy in 1960 and holds bachelor's and Doctor of Science degrees from the Massachusetts Institute of Technology. His academic career spanned almost thirty years, starting at MIT in 1968 and concluding as president of Carnegie Mellon University. He left MIT in 1975, where he was an associate professor. From 1975 to 1979, he was a professor of metallurgy and professor of mechanical engineering at the University of Illinois in Champaign-Urbana. From 1983 to 1990, he served as the 4th dean of engineering at the University of California, Santa Barbara.

Mehrabian also spent four years in the Senior Executive Service of the U.S. Government. As director of the Center for Materials Science of the Department of Commerce's National Institute of Standards and Technology, he initiated numerous government/industry programs that became models for such cooperative efforts. He spun off several high-technology companies during his U.C. Santa Barbara and Carnegie Mellon University tenures. An internationally recognized authority on advanced technologies, Mehrabian also served as a senior advisor in manufacturing and high-technology processes to many Fortune 500 companies.

Mehrabian holds eight U.S. and more than 40 foreign patents. He has authored 139 technical papers and edited six materials science and engineering books. His awards include Fellow and Distinguished Life Member of the American Society of Metals International (ASM), the Henry Marion Howe Medal of the ASM, and a Fellow and Leadership Award recipient of the Minerals, Metals, and Materials Society (TMS). His honorary degrees include Sc.D. from Carnegie Mellon and L.H.D. from Chatham College. He was also elected a member of the National Academy of Engineering 1984 for significant and timely advances in the rapid solidification of alloy systems and the novel casting of liquid-solid mixtures.

Academic offices
Preceded by Richard Cyert	Carnegie Mellon University President; 1990 – 1997	Succeeded by Jared Cohon
