= XRDS (magazine) =

Academic magazine for ACM student members

XRDS: Crossroads, The ACM Magazine for Students
- Editor: Julia Gersey
- Categories: Computer science
- Frequency: Quarterly
- Circulation: ~50,000 (online access); ~10,000 (printed version)
- Publisher: Association for Computing Machinery
- First issue: Fall 1994
- Country: USA
- Based in: New York City
- Language: English
- Website: http://xrds.acm.org/
- ISSN: 1528-4972

XRDS, formerly Crossroads, is the flagship academic magazine for student members of the Association for Computing Machinery (ACM). Issues focus on computer science topics and are published quarterly in both print and electronic forms. The magazine is distributed to tens of thousands of students worldwide. The full text of every issue is available online to ACM members through the ACM Digital Library, with many articles selected by the editorial staff open to the general public. The first edition was published in 1994^{(ACM 2010)} and was ACM's first electronically produced publication, originally being distributed in HTML. It is run by a group of volunteer students and supported by staff at ACM headquarters in New York City. XRDS employs a mixed invited and unsolicited submissions model, which are refereed by a staff of permanent editors.^{(ACM 2010b)} Issues exist for every quarter since Fall 1994, with a few extra, mid-Summer, issues.^{(ACM 2010c)}

== List of editors-in-chief ==
#	Editor-in-chief	Start of term	End of term
1	Saveen Reddy	1994	1994
2	Lorrie Faith Cranor	1994	1996
3	John Cavanos	1996	1998
4	Lynellen D. S. Perry	1998	2001
5	Bill Stevenson	2001	2005
6	Jerry Guo	2006	2009
7	Chris Harrison	2009	2012
8	Peter Kinnaird and Inbal Talgam	2012	2013
9	Inbal Talgam and Sean Follmer	2013	2015
10	Jennifer Jacobs and Okke Schrijvers	2015	2017
11	Gierad Laput and Diane Golay	2017	2019
12	Diane Golay	2019	2021
13	Karan Ahuja	2021	2023
14	Karan Ahuja and Jiayi Li	2022	2023
15	Jiayi Li	2022	2025
16	Julia Gersey	2025	Present

== Current Editorial Board ==
1	Feature Editors
#	Murtaza Ali, Sejal Bhalla, Poojita Garg, Srijan Pandey, Prena Ravi, Jack Thoene, Jessica Yauney
2	Department Editors
#	Sai Varun Chandrashekar (Updates), Fiona Herzog (Events), Pavithra Sripathanallur Murali (Hello World), Lynette Hui Xian Ng (Pointers), Frank Schotanus (Milestones)
3	Senior Editor
#	Denise Doig

== Relaunch ==
The magazine was originally titled Crossroads, but in May 2010, it was given a makeover led by then editor-in-chief Chris Harrison and the title was replaced by the pseudo-acronym "XRDS". Prior to the relaunch, the format of the magazine was similar to that of its cousin for ACM professional members, the Communications of the ACM, where articles are summaries of research papers. With the Summer 2010 issue of XRDS, ACM inaugurated a completely revamped edition of the magazine. Targeted to both graduate and undergraduate students contemplating computing careers, the newly redesigned XRDS offers breaking news and information, practical career advice, and first-hand stories and profiles of people in the computing field.
