= Scott Hudson (computer scientist) =

American computer scientist

Scott E. Hudson
- Citizenship: United States
- Education: University of Colorado (PhD)
- Awards: CHI Academy; SIGCHI Lifetime Research Award
- Scientific career
- Fields: Human-Computer Interaction
- Workplaces: Carnegie Mellon University

Scott E. Hudson is a professor in the Human-Computer Interaction Institute at Carnegie Mellon University.

== Career ==
Hudson was previously an associate professor in the College of Computing at the Georgia Institute of Technology, and prior to that, an assistant professor of computer science at the University of Arizona. He earned his Ph.D. in computer science at the University of Colorado in 1986.

He regularly serves on the ACM SIGCHI and UIST conference program committees. He is also a founding associate editor for ACM Transactions on Computer-Human Interaction. Hudson was the first and founding director of the PhD program in Human-Computer Interaction at Carnegie Mellon University.

== Research ==
Hudson has published over 150 papers and is the 17th most prolific author in the field. He is the most published author at the ACM UIST conference.

Along with Robert Xiao and Chris Harrison, colleagues at CMU, he developed Lumitrack, a motion tracking technology which is currently used in video game controllers and in the film industry.

== Recognition ==
Hudson was elected to the CHI Academy in 2006. He was named as an ACM Fellow, in the 2024 class of fellows, "for contributions in user interface software, interactive devices, and computational fabrication applied to HCI".
