= The Last Lecture =

Book by Jeffrey Zaslow and Randy Pausch

- Author: Jeffrey Zaslow, Randy Pausch
- Language: English
- Genre: Non-fiction
- Publisher: Hyperion
- Publication date: April 8, 2008
- Publication place: United States
- Media type: Print (hardcover and paperback)
- Pages: 224
- ISBN: 1-4013-2325-1
- OCLC: 183266069
- LC Class: QA76.2.P38 A3 2008b

The Last Lecture is a 2008 New York Times best-selling book co-authored by Randy Pausch—a professor of computer science, human-computer interaction, and design at Carnegie Mellon University in Pittsburgh, Pennsylvania—and Jeffrey Zaslow of the Wall Street Journal. The book extends the September 2007 lecture by Pausch entitled "Really Achieving Your Childhood Dreams". The Last Lecture is renowned for its witty humor, despite encompassing Pausch's farewell to his loved ones due to his terminal pancreatic cancer. In the book, through his past experiences, Pausch attempts to lend advice to his children that they may need once he has passed. He recounts memories growing up and important people who have been vital in "achieving his childhood dreams."

== Background ==
Randy Pausch was a professor of computer science at Carnegie Mellon University in Pittsburgh, Pennsylvania, for ten years. He received numerous honors while teaching at the university including being named "Person of the Year" by ABC News, as well as being named to the "One Hundred Most Influential People in the World". In 2006 Pausch's doctors informed him that he had developed pancreatic cancer. Pausch had a resection done to try and eliminate the cancer, although a year after his procedure his doctors indicated that his cancer had returned. The cancer had metastasized to his liver and he was informed he had three to six months left to live. His first task was saying goodbye to the job he loved by participating in Carnegie Mellon's last lecture circuit. When a professor is leaving or retiring from the university, they are encouraged to give a "last lecture" where top academics are asked to think deeply about what matters to them, and then give a hypothetical "final talk", i.e., "what wisdom would you try to impart to the world if you knew it was your last chance?" Pausch delivered his "Last Lecture", titled "Really Achieving Your Childhood Dreams", at Carnegie Mellon on September 18, 2007. According to The Los Angeles Times, Pausch paired up with a co-author, Jeffrey Zaslow, to put his lecture into words, creating The Last Lecture. After publishing the book and recording his lecture, Pausch dedicated the rest of his time to enjoying his family and advocating for pancreatic cancer patients. He felt responsible for people suffering from the cancer, explaining, "We don't have advocates for this disease because they don't live long enough. We don't have a Michael J. Fox because people die too fast." Pausch died on July 25, 2008.

== Synopsis ==
The Last Lecture is organized similarly throughout each of the nine chapters. Pausch depicts an important event in his life in the first half of each chapter. Then, he describes how this event either brought him closer to achieving his childhood dreams or taught him valuable lessons he refers to throughout his life.

Chapter 1 “An Injured Lion Still Wants to Roar”: Pausch has a dilemma in deciding to give his last lecture or not. His desire to leave a tangible memory of himself for his three young children leads him to the decision to deliver his lecture despite having months left to live.

Chapter 2 “My Life in a Laptop”: His objective is to collect over 300 images for the presentation that will help direct him throughout his speech. Pausch comments on an interaction he had with a pregnant woman, who was less than delighted about her unplanned pregnancy. This leads him to think about the “accidental elements” that bring people in or take people out of this world, much like his pancreatic cancer.

Chapter 3 “The Elephant in the Room”: Pausch describes the beginning of his lecture, dressed in his Disney Imagineer uniform to represent achieving one's childhood dreams. He presents slides with images of the tumors on his liver, thus addressing “the elephant in the room”.

Chapter 4 “The Parent Lottery”: Pausch credits his parents for his success in achieving his childhood dreams. He recounts how his mother valued compassion for others compared to mundane accomplishments for himself, while his father, a storyteller with a desire to make a moral point. His sister comments that hearing Pausch deliver his final speech was like hearing her father's voice come out of her brother's mouth.

Chapter 5 “The Elevator in the Ranch House”: Pausch, his siblings, and his friends win over their parents and are allowed to craft their own mural on his bedroom walls. The painting included an elevator door, a rocket ship, chess pieces, etc. His advice is for parents to let their kids express their creativity and allow them to paint their rooms if they ask.

Chapter 6 “Getting to Zero-G”: Pausch fulfills his childhood dream of experiencing zero gravity. He gathers a team of students to enter competition for a ride aboard NASA's “Vomit Comet”. When his team wins, he is so excited that he'll achieve his childhood dream. However, NASA made it very clear that, under no circumstances, were faculty members or advisors allowed to fly with the teams. After careful review of the program literature, Pausch withdrew his application as team faculty advisor and replaced it with an application as 'Randy Pausch, web journalist.' NASA accepted the change and Pausch was able to take part in the experience. Pausch ends the chapter with a lesson stating that someone should always bring something to the table when seeking to achieve their dreams.

Chapter 7 “I Never Made It to the NFL”: Pausch imparts one of the most important things his football coach taught him was that “when you're screwing up and nobody says anything to you anymore, they've given up on you.” Pausch is reminded of his coach when he feels like giving up and works harder because of him. He discusses the idea of “head fake” which is teaching real-life skills embedded into other skills.

Chapter 8 “You'll Find Me Under ‘V’”: One of Pausch’s many childhood dreams is to contribute to the encyclopedia. His career in computer science allows him to achieve this dream. He was asked to write the section on virtual reality as he was one of the founders of Carnegie Mellon’s virtual reality program.

Chapter 9 “A Skill Set Called Leadership”: Growing up Pausch dreamed to be Captain James T. Kirk from the 1960s TV series Star Trek. Pausch details how William Shatner, the actor who played Captain Kirk, came to his virtual reality lab at Carnegie Mellon. Pausch recites a line from the Star Trek movie, in which Kirk reprograms a simulation that kills the whole crew because "he didn't believe in the no-win scenario." Pausch found this line within his own story when, in the face of his diagnosis, Shatner sent him an autographed picture, signing it with that same line from the movie.

== Reception ==
The Last Lecture received numerous positive reviews. After giving his last lecture, people were eager to know more about Pausch's life experiences. After the book was released in 2008, 2.3 million copies were printed and it has been published in 29 languages. The popularity of the book has made it almost impossible to find in stores. Before the book's publishing, in a miscalculation, the book's publisher, Walt Disney Co.'s Hyperion, did not print enough copies to meet the initial demand. They planned to print 400,000, but as the release date of the book neared, Hyperion knew they were going to need thousands of more copies to keep up with orders. On April 8, 2008, the day of the book's release, The Last Lecture immediately soared to the No. 1 slot on multiple different sales charts. In particular, The Wall Street Journal’s nonfiction list, the advice section of the New York Times’ list, and Amazon.

Many critics note Pausch’s ability to represent his endearing and witty personality throughout the story despite writing it knowing his cancer diagnosis. Editorial Director for Hyperion, Will Balliett, remarks: “Randy is clearly a remarkable person, with a great capacity for giving, and doing it with an unusual degree of honesty, humor, and passion”. These qualities translate when composing The Last Lecture as critics often refer to the story as heartbreaking, yet witty. Mike Gruss, a columnist from the Virginian Pilot, notes the story's uniqueness: "...Unlike others in the genre, The Last Lecture includes specific advice. Overall, Pausch's story is as heartbreaking as it is inspiring." Comparing it to the lecture given, Karen R. Long, from the Houston Chronicle, recounts: "The text focuses more cleanly on the nitty-gritty of making a good life". As well, Sonja Barisic, from the Record, expresses: "The book goes beyond the lecture, giving Pausch more room to tell his kids what he would have tried to teach them over the next twenty years. He counsels them to have fun, tell the truth, dare to take risks, look for the best in everyone, make time for what matters, and always be prepared".
