= Lumitrack =

Lumitrack is a motion capture technology developed by Robert Xiao, Chris Harrison and Scott Hudson at Carnegie Mellon University. It combines projectors and sensors to provide high-fidelity motion-tracking. These types of sensors are used in video game controllers, such as Microsoft's Kinect, and in motion capture for movie and television production.

Although the research prototype of Lumitrack currently uses visible light, it could be adapted to utilize invisible infrared light. According to the university, the sensors require little power and should be cheap to mass-produce. They could even be built into smartphones.

== Technology ==
The projectors cover the tracked area with structured patterns called a binary m-sequence that resemble barcodes. The series of bars encodes a series of an assortment of vertical lines of varying thicknesses, without repeating any combination of seven adjacent line types anywhere in the projected image. The sensors read the bars to assess motion. The initial implementation offers sub-millimeter accuracy. When two m-sequences are projected at right angles to each other, the sensor can determine its position in two dimensions; while additional sensors enable 3D tracking.

The sensors are simple to manufacture and require little power and features response times in the range of 2.5 milliseconds, making them candidates for incorporation into other devices, such as phones. The sensors can be attached to tracked objects or to fixed objects such as walls.

== Applications ==
The developers target video games as an initial application. Other possibilities include including CGI for movies and television and human–robot interaction.
