= Mary Czerwinski =

American cognitive scientist

- Education: Indiana University; Ball State University
- Awards: ACM SIGCHI Lifetime Service Award; ACM Fellow (2016); Fellow of the American Psychological Science Association (2018); Distinguished Alumni Award from Indiana University's Brain and Psychological Sciences department (2014)
- Scientific career
- Fields: Cognitive science, human-Computer Interaction
- Workplaces: Microsoft Research
- Website: web.archive.org/web/20240908195624/https://www.microsoft.com/en-us/research/people/marycz/

Mary Czerwinski is an American cognitive scientist and computer-human interaction expert who used to work for Microsoft Research as the manager of the Human Understanding and Empathy (HUE) group researching and developing systems that recognize, interpret, process and respond to human emotions for social good. Czerwinski resides in Redmond, WA.

== Education ==
Czerwinski's education included 1978-1982—M.A; B.A, Experimental Psychology; Psychology at Ball State University She earned her doctorate in cognitive science from Indiana University Bloomington 1982-1988.

== Career and research ==
She worked in computer-human interaction for Bellcore, the Johnson Space Center, and Compaq, and also held an adjunct position at Rice University while at Compaq. She moved to Microsoft in 1996, as a usability tester in product development. Two years later, she joined Microsoft Research, as the first social scientist to work there. She worked in the visualization and interaction research group managing researchers, designers, and developers doing human-computer interaction research. Her main research focus is around large/multiple displays, social and physiological computing, novel information visualizations and interaction techniques She was also an affiliated faculty member with the psychology department at the University of Washington from 1996 to 2009, and has been an adjunct professor in Washington's Information School since 2011. In 2015 she was named a Fellow of the Association for Computing Machinery "for contributions to human-computer interaction and leadership in the CHI community." In 2014, she also received the Distinguished Alumni award from Indiana University's Brain and Psychological Sciences department and will receive a Distinguished Alumni award from the College of Arts and Sciences from Indiana in February, 2018.

Czerwinski retired from Microsoft Research in 2024.

Czerwinski has published over a hundred papers during her time at Microsoft Collectively, her work has been cited over 10,000 times since 2016.

Her work focuses on developing Artificial Emotional Intelligence (AEI) to create systems that recognize and respond to human emotions. She promotes the idea of balancing emotions rather than striving for nonstop productivity and envisions AI enhancing well-being and efficiency in the workplace by adapting to users' emotional states.

== Awards ==
ACM SIGCHI Lifetime Service Award, ACM Fellow (2016), ACM Distinguished Scientist (2010), Fellow of the American Psychological Science Association (2018), Distinguished Alumni Award from Indiana University's Brain and Psychological Sciences department (2014). Chicago Global Visionaries Award (2006), EAI (European Alliance for Innovation) (2019) and elected to the National Academy of Engineering (2022).

== Journals/conference papers/patents ==
=== Journal and conference papers ===
- Czerwinski, M., Horvitz, E., & Wilhite, S. (2004). "A diary study of task switching and interruptions." Proceedings of the SIGCHI Conference on Human Factors in Computing Systems.
- Robertson, G., Czerwinski, M., Larson, K., Robbins, D. C., Thiel, D., & van Dantzich, M. (1998). "Data mountain: Using spatial memory for document management." Proceedings of the 11th Annual ACM Symposium on User Interface Software and Technology.
- Fisher, D., DeLine, R., Czerwinski, M., & Drucker, S. (2012). "Interactions with big data analytics." interactions, 19(3), 50–59.
- Baudisch, P., Cutrell, E., Czerwinski, M., Robbins, D. C., Tandler, P., Bederson, B. B., & Zierlinger, A. (2003). "Drag-and-Pop and Drag-and-Pick: Techniques for accessing remote screen content on touch-and-pen-operated systems." INTERACT, 3, 57–64.
- Larson, K., & Czerwinski, M. (1998). "Web page design: Implications of memory, structure, and scent for information retrieval." Proceedings of the SIGCHI Conference on Human Factors in Computing Systems.
- Czerwinski, M., Cutrell, E., & Horvitz, E. (2000). "Instant messaging and interruption: Influence of task type on performance." OZCHI 2000 Conference Proceedings, 356, 361–367.
- Biehl, J. T., Czerwinski, M., Smith, G., & Robertson, G. G. (2007). "FASTDash: A visual dashboard for fostering awareness in software teams." Proceedings of the SIGCHI Conference on Human Factors in Computing Systems.
- Czerwinski, M., Smith, G., Regan, T., Meyers, B., Robertson, G. G., & Starkweather, G. (2003). "Toward characterizing the productivity benefits of very large displays." INTERACT, 3, 9–16.
- Shneiderman, B., Fischer, G., Czerwinski, M., Resnick, M., Myers, B., Candy, L., ... & Terry, M. (2006). "Creativity support tools: Report from a US National Science Foundation sponsored workshop." International Journal of Human-Computer Interaction, 20(2), 61–77.
- McDuff, D., Karlson, A., Kapoor, A., Roseway, A., & Czerwinski, M. (2012). "AffectAura: An intelligent system for emotional memory." Proceedings of the SIGCHI Conference on Human Factors in Computing Systems.

=== Patents ===
- Gupta, A., & Czerwinski, M. P. (2007). "Integrating collaborative messaging into an electronic mail program." US Patent 7,222,156.
- Czerwinski, M., Smith, G., Meyers, B., Baudisch, P. M., & Robertson, G. G. (2011). "System and method for managing software applications in a graphical user interface." US Patent 7,913,183.
- Czerwinski, M., Dumais, S. T., Dziadosz, S. E., Robbins, D. C., & Robertson, G. G. (2001). "Methods, apparatus, and data structures for providing a user interface, which exploits spatial memory, to objects." US Patent 6,188,405.
