= Mitsubishi Electric Research Laboratories =

Mitsubishi Electric Research Laboratories, Inc. (MERL)
- Type: Subsidiary
- Headquarters: Cambridge, Massachusetts, United States
- Key people: Anthony Vetro (President & CEO) Mitsubishi Electric Research Laboratories web site. Retrieved 17 September 2025.
- Number of employees: Over 50
- Parent: Mitsubishi Electric US
- Website: www.merl.com

Mitsubishi Electric Research Laboratories (MERL) is a subsidiary of Mitsubishi Electric US Holdings, Inc., which is the principal subsidiary of Mitsubishi Electric in the United States. MERL acts as North American arm of Mitsubishi's Corporate R&D organization and is located in Cambridge, Massachusetts, United States.

MERL engages in application-motivated basic research and advanced development in areas crucial to Mitsubishi Electric. The facility employs more than 50 PhDs who conduct research and development across a wide range of fields, including robotics, machine learning, digital signal processing, digital audio and video processing, wired and wireless digital communications, spoken language interfaces, computer vision, mechatronics and fundamental algorithms. Since its founding in 1991, MERL has been awarded over 700 patents.

== History ==
Mitsubishi Electric Research Laboratories was founded in Cambridge, Massachusetts in 1991 by the Mitsubishi Electric CR&D organization. In the late 1990s, MERL merged with two other laboratories that were part of Mitsubishi Electric. This consolidated all of Mitsubishi Electric’s North American research into one organization, creating the MERL that exists today. Richard C. Waters, was a founding member of MERL and has been president since 1999.

László Bélády was the head of MERL from 1991 to 1998, James D. Foley, who co-authored many of the most widely used university textbooks on computer graphics, was the president from 1998 to 1999.

== Research areas ==
MERL conducts application motivated basic research and advanced development in

• Electronics & Communications: Wireless and optical communications, advanced signal processing, optical and semiconductor devices, and electro-magnetics, RF& Power

• Multimedia: Efficient acquisition, representation, processing, security, and interaction of multimedia.

• Data Analytics: Predictive analytics, decision analytics, modeling, simulation, and optimization.

• Spatial Analysis: Processing data from across space and time to extract meaning and build representations of objects and events in the world.

• Mechatronics: Advanced control.

An Algorithms group supports all five sectors, developing fundamental algorithms.

== Products, projects, and technology ==
MERL generates new technology and intellectual property, and has been involved in numerous products and projects, including:

- Generalized Belief Propagation
- Human–computer interaction via the Multi-touch DiamondTouch surface
- Saffron Type System
- Multiview Video Coding
- Ultra-wideband network technology using Orthogonal Frequency Division Multiplexing
- Seam carving
