= Karon MacLean =

Computer scientist and mechanical engineer

Karon E. MacLean
- Education: Stanford University (BS, 1986); Massachusetts Institute of Technology (SM, 1988; PhD, 1996)
- Known for: Haptic technology; Affective haptics; Human–computer interaction; Human–robot interaction
- Awards: Canada Research Chair (Tier 1, 2021); IEEE Fellow (2023)
- Scientific career
- Fields: Computer science; Mechanical engineering
- Workplaces: University of British Columbia

Karon E. MacLean is a computer scientist and mechanical engineer whose research involves haptic technology and affective haptics in human–computer interaction and human–robot interaction. Educated in the US, she works in Canada as a professor of computer science and Canada Research Chair in Interactive Human Systems Design at the University of British Columbia.

== Education and career ==
MacLean was an undergraduate at Stanford University, where she graduated in 1986 with a double major in biological sciences and mechanical engineering. She earned a master's degree in mechanical engineering at to the Massachusetts Institute of Technology (MIT) in 1988. After two years working as an engineer at the University of Utah, she returned to MIT for a Ph.D. in mechanical engineering, completed in 1996.

She was a researcher for Interval Research Corporation from 1996 to 2000. In 2000, she became an assistant professor at the University of British Columbia (UBC); she has been a full professor there since 2010. At UBC, she is the co-founder and director of the Designing for People (DFP) Research Cluster, director of the Sensory Perception and Interaction Research Group, and associate director of the Institute for Computing, Information and Cognitive Systems.

== Recognition ==
MacLean was given a tier 1 Canada Research Chair in Interactive Human Systems Design by the Natural Sciences and Engineering Research Council in 2021. She was elected as an IEEE Fellow, in the 2023 class of fellows, "for contributions to the design of haptic communication", and is a Distinguished Lecturer of the IEEE Technical Committee for Haptics.
