= Chia Shen =

American computer scientist

- Education: Stony Brook University (BS); University of Massachusetts Amherst (MS, PhD)
- Scientific career
- Fields: Computer science
- Workplaces: Mitsubishi Electric Research Laboratories; Harvard University; National Science Foundation
- Thesis: An Integrated Approach to Dynamic Task and Resource Management in Multiprocessor Real-Time Systems (1992)

Chia Shen is a Chinese-American computer scientist specialized in human–computer interaction, visual learning, and computer-supported collaborative learning. She is a program director at the National Science Foundation overseeing cyberlearning and STEM education initiatives.

== Education ==
Shen completed a B.S. in computer science at Stony Brook University in 1983. She earned a M.S. (1986) and Ph.D. (1992) in computer science at University of Massachusetts Amherst. Her dissertation was titled An Integrated Approach to Dynamic Task and Resource Management in Multiprocessor Real-Time Systems.

== Career ==
Shen joined Mitsubishi Electric Research Laboratories (MERL) in 1993 as a research scientist. She served as associate director and senior research directory from 2003 to 2006. Shen was an adjunct graduate faculty member at the University of Toronto from 2007 to 2010. From 2008 to 2016, Shen was affiliated with Harvard University first as a visiting senior scientist and later as a senior research fellow and director of the Scientists' Discovery Room Lab in the Harvard John A. Paulson School of Engineering and Applied Sciences. Starting in March 2016, she became a program director in the division of research on learning in formal and informal settings at the National Science Foundation. She oversees programs on cyberlearning and STEM education.

Shen's research specialties include human–computer interaction, visualization, visual learning, learning technologies, computer-supported collaborative learning, and interaction design.
