= Floor control =

Computer networking term

For computer networking, floor control allows users of networked multimedia applications to utilize and share resources such as remote devices, distributed data sets, telepointers, or continuous media such as video and audio without access conflicts. Floors are temporary permissions granted dynamically to collaborating users in order to mitigate race conditions and guarantee mutually exclusive resource usage.

In floor control, a user who wishes to speak makes a request (through their user equipment unit (UE)) for the right to speak, and then waits for a response that either grants or denies the user's request. In accordance with early PoC proposals, the floor is granted only for talk burst on a first received basis, and no queuing of floor control messages is performed.
