= Jared Cohon =

American academic administrator (1947–2024)

Jared Leigh Cohon

8th President of Carnegie Mellon University
- In office 1997–2013
- Preceded by: Robert Mehrabian
- Succeeded by: Subra Suresh

Personal details
- Born: October 7, 1947 Cleveland, Ohio, U.S.
- Died: March 16, 2024 (aged 76) Ligonier, Pennsylvania, U.S.
- Education: University of Pennsylvania; Massachusetts Institute of Technology
- Awards: National Engineering Award from the American Association of Engineering Societies, National Academy of Engineering, American Academy of Arts and Sciences

Jared Leigh Cohon (October 7, 1947 – March 16, 2024) was an American academic administrator who served as the eighth president of Carnegie Mellon University beginning in 1997 in Pittsburgh, Pennsylvania, United States. As of 2014, he was a university professor in the Carnegie Mellon College of Engineering.

== Life and career ==
Jared Leigh Cohon was born in Cleveland, Ohio on October 7, 1947 to Jewish parents. He held a BS in Civil Engineering from the University of Pennsylvania and M.S. and Ph.D. degrees in Civil and Environmental Engineering from Massachusetts Institute of Technology, earned in 1972 and 1973, respectively.

Prior to Carnegie Mellon, Cohon was the Dean of the School of Forestry and Environmental Studies and professor of environmental systems analysis at Yale University from 1992 to 1997 and was a faculty member in the Department of Geography and Environmental Engineering and Assistant and Associate Dean of Engineering and Vice Provost for Research at Johns Hopkins University from 1973 to 1992.

He became president of Carnegie Mellon in 1997. During his first month of his presidency, he oversaw the removal of a stand of trees to build the Purnell Center for the Arts. He was shocked that there were no student protests against the act.

"I'm worried that our undergraduates can be so focused on preparing for their careers that they fail to develop a sense of and passion for what else is important to them." –Jared Cohon, 1997 copy of The Thistle, Carnegie Mellon's now defunct yearbook

Cohon stepped down from his position as President of Carnegie Mellon in 2013 and returned to the faculty as a university professor in the Departments of Civil and Environmental Engineering and Engineering and Public Policy and director of the Wilton E. Scott Institute for Energy Innovation. In 2014, Carnegie Mellon announced that the University Center would be renamed in honor of President Cohon and will be called the Cohon University Center.

Cohon was elected a member of the National Academy of Engineering (2012) for contributions to environmental systems analysis and national policy and leadership in higher education.

Cohon died on March 16, 2024, at the age of 76.

== Sources ==
- Fenton, Edwin (2000). Carnegie Mellon 1900-2000: A Centennial History. Pittsburgh: Carnegie Mellon University Press. ISBN 0-88748-323-2.

Academic offices
Preceded by Robert Mehrabian	Carnegie Mellon University President; 1997–2013	Succeeded by Subra Suresh
