= Object-based language =

Type of programming language

An object-based language is a imperative programming language that provides a construct to encapsulate state and behavior as an object. A language that also supports inheritance or subtyping is classified as object-oriented. Even though object-oriented programming is a superset of object-based programming, some authors distinguish them by name only when it is useful to point out that a given programming language lacks inheritance. Examples of strictly object-based languages – supporting an object feature but not inheritance or subtyping – are early versions of Ada, CLU, Visual Basic 6 (VB6), and Fortran 90.

Some classify prototype-based programming as object-based even though it supports inheritance and subtyping albeit not via a class concept. Instead an object inherits its state and behavior from a template object. A commonly used language with prototype-based programming support is JavaScript.

== See also ==
- Class (programming)
- Class-based programming
- Object (computer science)
- Object-oriented programming
