= Maurice Wilkes Award =

The Association for Computing Machinery SIGARCH Maurice Wilkes Award is given annually for outstanding contribution to computer architecture by a young computer scientist or engineer; "young" defined as having a career that started within the last 20 years. The award is named after Maurice Wilkes, a computer scientist credited with several important developments in computing such as microprogramming. The award is presented at the International Symposium on Computer Architecture. Prior recipients include:

- 1998 – Wen-mei Hwu
- 1999 – Gurindar S. Sohi
- 2000 – William J. Dally
- 2001 – Anant Agarwal
- 2002 – Glenn Hinton
- 2003 – Dirk Meyer
- 2004 – Kourosh Gharachorloo
- 2005 – Steve Scott
- 2006 – Doug Burger
- 2007 – Todd Austin
- 2008 – Sarita Adve
- 2009 – Shubu Mukherjee
- 2010 – Andreas Moshovos
- 2011 – Kevin Skadron
- 2012 – David Brooks
- 2013 – Parthasarathy (Partha) Ranganathan
- 2014 – Ravi Rajwar
- 2015 – Christos Kozyrakis
- 2016 – Timothy Sherwood
- 2017 – Lieven Eeckhout
- 2018 – Gabriel Loh
- 2019 – Onur Mutlu
- 2020 – Luis Ceze and Karin Strauss
- 2021 – Thomas Wenisch
- 2022 – Moinuddin Qureshi
- 2023 – Abhishek Bhattacharjee
- 2024 – Reetuparna Das
- 2025 – Carole-Jean Wu

== See also ==
- ACM Special Interest Group on Computer Architecture
- Computer engineering
- Computer science
- Computing
- List of computer science awards
- List of computer-related awards
