= Onur Mutlu =

Turkish-American computer scientist

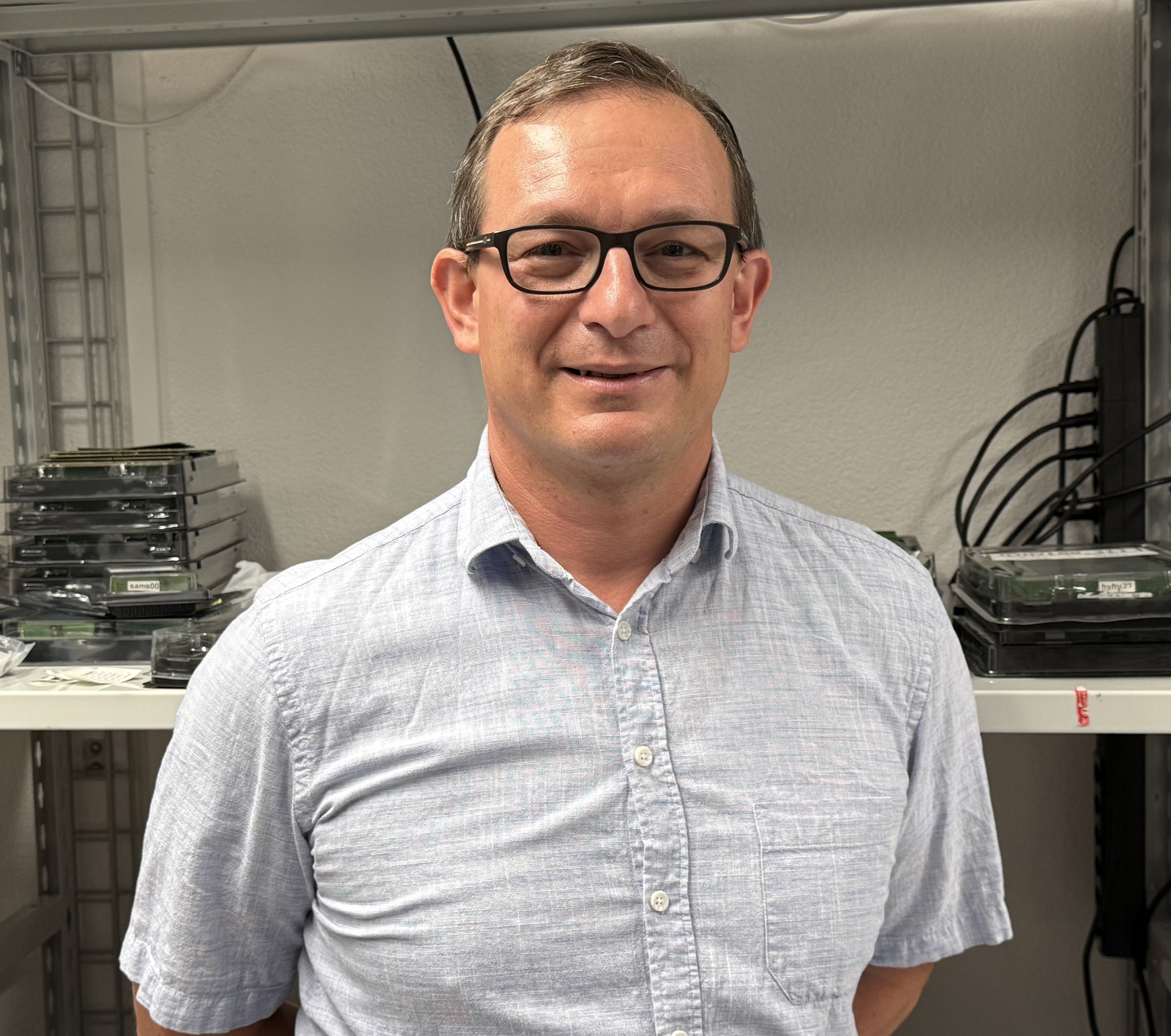
- Onur Mutlu
- Born: November 6, 1978 (age 48); Kayseri,Turkey
- Citizenship: Turkish-American
- Education: Bachelor: University of Michigan, 2000; Master's and PhD: University of Texas at Austin, 2002 and 2006
- Known for: RowHammer, DRAM architecture, memory system design, processing in memory, runahead execution, NAND flash memory controllers, memory-centric computing
- Awards: IEEE Computer Society Harry H. Goode Memorial Award (2025); IFIP Jean-Claude Laprie Award in Dependable Computing (2024); IEEE Computer Society Edward J. McCluskey Technical Achievement Award (2020); ACM SIGARCH Maurice Wilkes Award (2019); ACM Fellow (2017); IEEE Fellow (2018); AAAS Fellow (2025); National Science Foundation CAREER Award (2010)
- Scientific career
- Fields: Computer architecture memory systems hardware security genome analysis dependable computing storage systems bioinformatics
- Workplaces: ETH Zurich; Carnegie Mellon University; Microsoft Research; Intel; AMD; VMware; Google
- Doctoral advisor: Yale Patt

Onur Mutlu (born 1978) is a Turkish-American computer scientist and professor of computer architecture at ETH Zurich. He previously held the William D. and Nancy W. Strecker Early Career Professorship at Carnegie Mellon University. His research focuses on computer architecture, memory systems, hardware security, bioinformatics and efficient & high-performance computing systems design. He leads the SAFARI Research Group at ETH Zurich. He was born in Turkey, he took his undergraduate degree at the University of Michigan Ann Arbor and his postgraduate degree and PhD at the University of Texas at Austin.

Mutlu is known for his research on computer architecture, especially memory system design and reliability, including work on the RowHammer phenomenon in dynamic random-access memory (DRAM). His group's research on the RowHammer vulnerability was the first to demonstrate that repeatedly accessing certain rows in DRAM can cause bit flips in adjacent rows, revealing a widespread hardware failure mechanism, with implications for system security and reliability. He has also conducted significant research into processing-in-memory systems, including research into processing using DRAM, near-memory processing, in-storage processing, and processing using flash memory. As of June 2026 he had an h-index of 141, and 481 cited publications.

== Academic biography ==
Mutlu completed both his PhD and MS at the University of Texas at Austin, and holds BS degrees in computer engineering and psychology from the University of Michigan. In 2006, he started the Computer Architecture Group at Microsoft Research and has held various positions in industry, including Intel Corporation, Google, VMware and AMD. He was a visiting professor at Stanford University during his sabbatical, 2023-2024, and holds adjunct professorships from Bilkent University and Carnegie Mellon University, where he previously held an assistant professorship from 2009-2013 and the Strecker Professorship from 2013-2016, before taking a professorship at ETH Zurich in 2016.

== Research ==
Mutlu's work primarily focuses on memory systems, processor architecture, and hardware security. One of his best-known contributions is the phenomenon called RowHammer. This finding, which shows that when a memory row in DRAM chips is accessed repeatedly, data bits in adjacent rows can be unintentionally corrupted, has had a wide impact on the field of hardware security and has formed the basis of many vulnerabilities. Mutlu and the SAFARI research group have continued to study this phenomenon; in 2023, they identified a related phenomenon called "RowPress," which shows that bit errors can be created in adjacent rows with fewer accesses by keeping a row open for a long time. Processing in memory, runahead execution, and predicting memory and branching behavior are also among Mutlu's main areas of research. He also conducts research in the field of bioinformatics, with a focus on genome analysis.

== Selected publications ==
Among Mutlu's best-known works are the following five articles selected for the 50th-anniversary retrospective selection (2023) of the ISCA conference, covering the period 1996-2020:

- "Self Optimizing Memory Controllers: A Reinforcement Learning Approach" (ISCA 2008)
- "RAIDR: Retention-Aware Intelligent DRAM Refresh" (ISCA 2012)
- "An Experimental Study of Data Retention Behavior in Modern DRAM Devices" (ISCA 2013)
- "Flipping Bits in Memory Without Accessing Them: An Experimental Study of DRAM Disturbance Errors" (ISCA 2014)
- "A Scalable Processing-in-Memory Accelerator for Parallel Graph Processing" (ISCA 2015)

Several of Mutlu's works were recognized with long-term impact prizes or test-of-time awards. These works include the following:

- "Runahead Execution: An Alternative to Very Large Instruction Windows for Out-of-order Processors" (HPCA 2003)
- "Architecting Phase Change Memory as a Scalable DRAM Alternative" (ISCA 2009)
- "Flipping Bits in Memory Without Accessing Them: An Experimental Study of DRAM Disturbance Errors" (ISCA 2014)
- "AVATAR: A Variable-Retention-Time (VRT) Aware Refresh for DRAM Systems" (DSN 2015)
- "PARBOR: An Efficient System-Level Technique to Detect Data-Dependent Failures in DRAM" (DSN 2016)

== Awards and honors ==
Mutlu has received numerous honors for his research. In 2017, he was named a fellow of the Association for Computing Machinery for "contributions to computer architecture research, especially in memory systems". In 2018, he was named a fellow of the Institute of Electrical and Electronics Engineers for "contributions to computer architecture research and practice" and elected as a member of the Academy of Europe. In 2025, he was named a fellow of the American Association for the Advancement of Science (AAAS), recognized “for foundational and innovative contributions to computer engineering research, education, and practice, especially in computer architecture and memory and storage systems”.

Mutlu was awarded the IEEE Computer Society Harry H. Goode Memorial Award in 2025, for "seminal contributions to computer architecture research and practice, especially in memory systems." Mutlu's PhD dissertation was on "Efficient Runahead Execution Processors" and his major first publication on this topic in 2003 received the Test of Time Award of the International Symposium on High Performance Computer Architecture in 2021. He was awarded the IEEE Computer Society Edward J. McCluskey Technical Achievement Award in 2020, for "innovative and impactful contributions to computer memory systems." Mutlu also received the Association for Computing Machinery SIGARCH Maurice Wilkes Award in 2019, for "innovative contributions to efficient and secure DRAM systems."

Several other of Mutlu's co-authored scientific papers have been recognized with Test of Time awards at various conferences. The original RowHammer paper that appeared at the 2014 International Symposium on Computer Architecture was recognized with the Jean-Claude Laprie Award in Dependable Computing in 2024 at the International Conference on Dependable Systems and Networks. The AVATAR work that proposed a reliable method of reducing DRAM refresh penalties, published in 2015, was recognized with the International Conference on Dependable Systems and Networks Test of Time Award in 2025. His work on "Architecting Phase Change Memory as a Scalable DRAM Alternative" that appeared at the 2009 International Symposium on Computer Architecture was recognized with the Non-Volatile Memories Workshop Persistent Impact Prize in 2022.
