= List of computer-related awards =

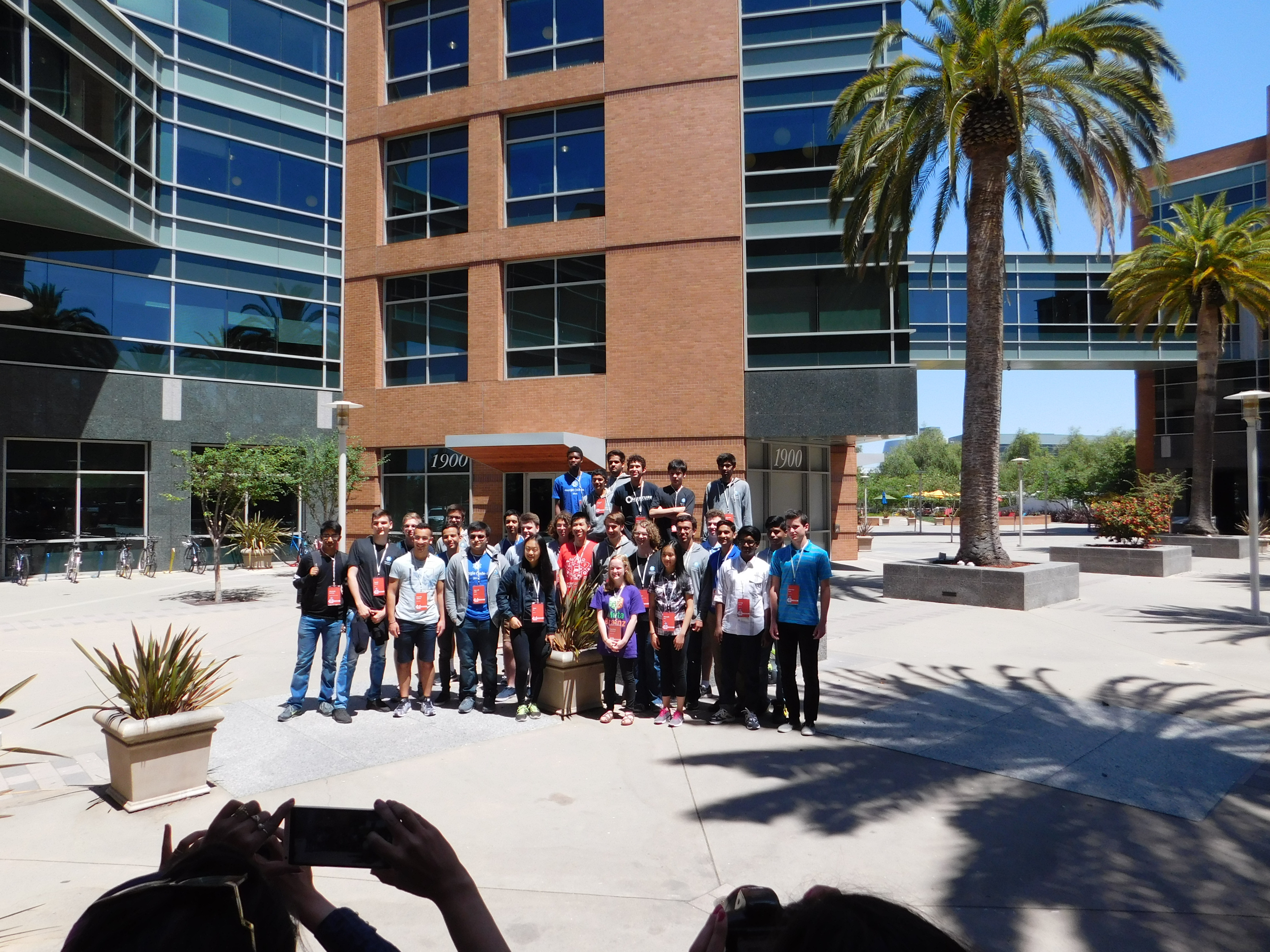
Google Code-in grand prize winners ceremony 2015

This list of computer-related awards is an index to articles about notable awards given for computer-related work. It excludes computer science awards and competitions, video game awards and web awards, which are covered by separate lists.

== Hardware ==
| Country | Award | Sponsor | Notes |
|---|---|---|---|
| International | Alan D. Berenbaum Distinguished Service Award | ACM SIGARCH | Computer architecture and design |
| International | IEEE Reynold B. Johnson Information Storage Systems Award | Institute of Electrical and Electronics Engineers | Outstanding contributions to information storage systems |
| United States | Phil Kaufman Award | Electronic System Design Alliance | Impact on electronic design by contributions to electronic design automation |
| United States | Maurice Wilkes Award | International Symposium on Computer Architecture | Outstanding contribution to computer architecture |

== Open source / freeware / shareware ==
| Country | Award | Sponsor | Notes |
|---|---|---|---|
| Europe | Akademy | KDE | Free software |
| Israel | August Penguin | Hamakor | Free software-related achievements |
| United States | FSF Free Software Awards | Free Software Foundation | Advancement of Free Software and Projects of Social Benefit |
| United States | Google Code-in | Google | To encourage high school students to participate in open source projects |
| France | Les Trophées du Libre | Les Trophées du libre | Free software contest |
| United States | O'Reilly Open Source Award | O'Reilly Media | Individuals recognized for dedication, innovation, leadership and outstanding contribution to open source |
| United States | Shareware Industry Awards | Shareware Industry Awards Foundation | Shareware industry |

== Security ==
| Country | Award | Sponsor | Notes |
|---|---|---|---|
| United States | Frank Byron Rowlett Award | National Security Agency | Outstanding organizational and individual excellence in the field of information systems security |
| United States | National Cyber Security Hall of Fame | National Cyber Security Hall of Fame | Contributions of key individuals in the field of cyber security |

== Programming ==
| Country | Award | Sponsor | Notes |
|---|---|---|---|
| International | Software Process Achievement Award | IEEE Computer Society | Outstanding and innovative contributions to the field of software quality |
| United States | Dr. Dobb's Excellence in Programming Award | Dr. Dobb's Journal | Significant contributions to the advancement of software development |
| United States | Iverson Award | Association for Computing Machinery | Significant contributions to the APL programming language or to the APL community |

== Applications ==
| Country | Award | Sponsor | Notes |
|---|---|---|---|
| Australia | AMY Awards | Digital + Technology Collective | Digital content, services and applications industry in Australia |
| United Kingdom | Appy Awards | Carphone Warehouse | Best apps |
| United States | Adobe MAX | Adobe Inc. | Applications |
| United States | CRM Idol | Information Today | Customer relationship management software |
| United States | CODiE Awards | Software and Information Industry Association | Business technology and education technology |
| International | World Summit Awards | World Summit on the Information Society | World’s best startup companies in digital content and innovative applications |

== Scholarship ==
| Country | Award | Sponsor | Notes |
|---|---|---|---|
| International | W. Wallace McDowell Award | IEEE Computer Society | Outstanding recent theoretical, design, educational, practical, or other similar innovative contributions that fall within the scope of Computer Society interest |
| International | Dijkstra Prize | Symposium on Principles of Distributed Computing, International Symposium on Distributed Computing | Outstanding papers on the principles of distributed computing |
| Japan | Kyoto Prize in Advanced Technology | Inamori Foundation | Electronics, Biotechnology and Medical Technology, Materials Science and Engineering or Information Science |
| United States | Knuth reward check | Donald Knuth | For finding technical, typographical, or historical errors, or making substantial suggestions for Donald Knuth's publications |
| Europe | Microsoft Award | Microsoft Research | Scientists working in Europe who had made a major contribution to the advancement of science through the use of computational methods |
| United States | Richard W. Lyman Award | National Humanities Center | Scholars who have advanced the humanities through the use of information technology |

== Other ==
| Country | Award | Sponsor | Notes |
|---|---|---|---|
| International | Computer Entrepreneur Award | IEEE Computer Society | Individuals with major technical or entrepreneurial contributions to the computer industry |
| International | Norbert Wiener Award for Social and Professional Responsibility | IEEE Society for the Social Implications of Technology | Contributions by computer professionals to socially responsible use of computers |
| United States | Anita Borg Institute Women of Vision Awards | Anita Borg Institute for Women and Technology | Exceptional achievement by women in technology |
| United Kingdom | British Inspiration Awards | (industry) | Achievement in the creative industries of the United Kingdom |
| Germany | CeBIT | Deutsche Messe AG | State of the art in information technology |
| United States | Dvorak Awards | Ascend Communications | Excellence in Communication (1992–1997) |
| International | Edison Award | Edison Awards | Honoring excellence in innovation |
| United States | EFF Pioneer Award | Electronic Frontier Foundation | People or organizations that have made significant contributions to the empowerment of individuals in using computers. |
| United States | Grace Murray Hopper Award | Association for Computing Machinery | Computer professional who makes a single, significant technical or service contribution at or before age 35 |
| Germany | Konrad Zuse Scholarship Programme 2009 | Federal Foreign Office, German Investment Corporation | One-year fellowship for ICT entrepreneurs |
| United States | Microsoft Most Valuable Professional | Microsoft | "Technology experts who passionately share their knowledge with the community." |
| Austria | Prix Ars Electronica | Ars Electronica | Electronic and interactive art, computer animation, digital culture and music |
| Russia | Runet Prize | Federal Agency on Press and Mass Communications of the Russian Federation | (various categories) |

== See also ==
- Lists of awards
- List of computer science awards
- Lists of science and technology awards
- List of engineering awards
