= ACM-W =

Subdivision of the Association for Computing Machinery

Association for Computing Machinery - Council on Women in Computing (ACM-W)
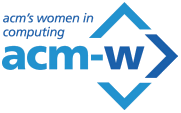
- Purpose: Women in Computing
- Region served: International
- Website: women.acm.org

The Association for Computing Machinery's Council on Women in Computing (ACM-W) supports, celebrates, and advocates internationally for the full engagement of women in all aspects of the computing field, providing a wide range of programs and services to ACM members and working in the larger community to advance the contributions of technical women. ACM-W is an active organization with over 36,000 members.

== Celebrations of Women in Computing ==
ACM-W sponsors annual celebrations focused on women in computing. ACM-W provides up to $3,000 seed funding for each celebration, and also raises and disburses corporate sponsorship. Each celebration organizing committee is responsible for additional fundraising within their conference area. ACM-W supports, celebrates, and advocates internationally for the full engagement of women in all aspects of the computing field, providing a wide range of programs and services to Association for Computing Machinery members and working in the larger community to advance the contributions of technical women.

ACM-W Celebrations are regional conferences with global participants from industry, academia, and government. Celebration participation is growing and these events represent some of the largest gatherings of women in technology.

The original Grace Hopper Celebration of Women in Computing was recognized by the US White House on their page "The Untold History of Women in Science and Technology" in the entry for United States Navy Rear Admiral Grace Hopper. In addition to this beginning, the conferences have attracted the participation of technology notables including Anita Hill, Chan Zuckerberg Initiative co-founder Priscilla Chan, and Justine Cassell of Carnegie Mellon University, one of the top universities in Computer Science. The list describes the expansion of celebrations globally to include the largest gathering of women in computing in India.

Canada
Conference	Location	Typically held	Year Established
ACM Canadian Celebration of Women in Computing (CAN-CWiC)	Canada	Annually in November	2015

Europe
Conference	Location	Year
womENcourage	Madrid, Spain	2024
womENcourage	Trondheim, Norway	2023
womENcourage	Larnaka, Cyprus	2022
womENcourage	Prague, Czech Republic	2021
womENcourage	Baku, Azerbaijan	2020
womENcourage	Rome, Italy	2019
womENcourage	Belgrade, Serbia	2018
womENcourage	Barcelona, Spain	2017
womENcourage	Linz, Austria	2016
womENcourage	Uppsala University, Sweden	2015
womENcourage	Manchester, United Kingdom	2014

India
Conference	Location	Year
AIWiC	Ahmedabad, Gujarat	2015

Philippines
Conference	Location	Year
PHIWiC	Skylight Convention Center, Puerto Princesa, Palawan	2016

Puerto Rico
Conference	Location	Year
CCWiC-Puerto Rico	University of Puerto Rico, Mayagüez Puerto Rico	2016

United Kingdom
Conference	Location	Year
Inspire 2020	University of York, United Kingdom	2020
Inspire 2019	University of Kent, United Kingdom	2019
Inspire 2018	De Montfort University, Leicester, United Kingdom	2018
Inspire 2017	University of Hertfordshire, United Kingdom	2017
Inspire 2015	Imperial College, London, United Kingdom	2015

United States
Conference	Location	Typically held	Year Established
Missouri, Iowa, Nebraska, Kansas Women in Computing Celebration (MINK WiC)	Kansas City, Missouri	biennial in November	2011
Rocky Mountain Celebration of Women in Computing (RMCWiC)	Denver, Colorado	biennial in Oct or Nov	2008
Grace Hopper Celebration of Women in Computing	United States	annual in October	2000

== Chapters ==
ACM-W has nearly 200 active professional, virtual and student chapters globally. The professional chapters serve to enhance communications networks thereby providing resources and support for women in the workforce. The student chapters serve to increase recruitment and retention of women in computing fields at the university level and offer student activities and projects that aim to improve the working and learning environments for women in computing.

== Awards ==
Starting in 2006, ACM-W has offered an annual Athena Lecturer Award to honor outstanding women researchers who have made fundamental contributions to computer science: It is now the ACM Athena Lecturers Award.

- 2006–2007: Deborah Estrin of UCLA
- 2007–2008: Karen Spärck Jones of University of Cambridge
- 2008–2009: Shafi Goldwasser of MIT and the Weitzmann Institute of Science
- 2009–2010: Susan J. Eggers of the University of Washington
- 2010–2011: Mary Jane Irwin of the Pennsylvania State University
- 2011–2012: Judith S. Olson of the University of California, Irvine
- 2012–2013: Nancy Lynch of MIT
- 2013–2014: Katherine Yelick of LBNL
- 2014–2015: Susan Dumais of Microsoft Research
- 2015–2016: Jennifer Widom of Stanford University
- 2016–2017: Jennifer Rexford of Princeton University
- 2017–2018: Lydia Kavraki of Rice University
- 2018–2019: Andrea Goldsmith of Princeton University
- 2019–2020: Elisa Bertino of Purdue University
- 2020–2021: Sarit Kraus of Bar-Ilan University
- 2021–2022: Ayanna Howard of Ohio State University
- 2022–2023: Éva Tardos of Cornell University

ACM-W also offers an ACM-W Networking Award for active student chapters.

== Scholarships ==
ACM-W provides support for women undergraduate and graduate students in Computer Science and related programs to attend research conferences. The ACM-W scholarships are offered for both intra-continental conference travel, and intercontinental conference travel. Scholarship applications are evaluated in six groups each year, to distribute awards across a range of conferences, including many annual ACM special interest group conferences such as SIGACCESS, SIGACT, SIGAI, SIGARCH, SIGCOMM, SIGCHI, SIGCSE, SIGDA, SIGECOM, SIGEVO, SIGGRAPH, SIGHPC, SIGIR, SIGITE, SIGMM, SIGMOBILE, SIGOPS, SIGPLAN, and SIGSOFT.

== Sponsors ==
Past sponsors of ACM-W services such as scholarships and regional celebrations include:

- Google
- Microsoft Research
- Oracle Academy
- Two Sigma

== Newsletter ==
ACM-W publishes a monthly newsletter that highlights people, opportunities, accomplishments, and current issues associated with women in computing. The network wide newsletter was started in 2008 with regional newsletters also provided.

== Officers ==
ACM-W officers include:

- Ruth G. Lennon, Chair
- Reyyan Ayfer, Vice Chair
- Melanie Wu, Treasurer
- Amelia Cole, Treasurer
- Arati Dixit, Standing Committee Chair
- Bushra Anjum, Standing Committee Chair
- Bettina Bair, Communications Committee Chair
- Sarah McRoberts, Communications Committee Chair
- Valerie Barr, Past Chair

ACM-W regions and chairs are:

- Rukiye Altin, Europe Chair
- Heena Timani, India Chair
- Monica McGill, North America
- Jacqueline Tate, Asia Pacific
- Hong Gao, China

ACM-W Standing Committees and Special Projects include:

- Viviana Bono, ACM-W Scholarships
- Pamela Wisniewski, ACM / ACM-W Awards Rising Star
- Rachelle Hippler, Professional Chapters
- Priya Chawla, Next Gen

ACM-W Communications Committee members:

- Jennifer Goodall, ACM-W Connections Newsletter Editor

== See also ==
- Association for Computing Machinery
- CRA-W: Committee on the Status of Women in Computing Research
- List of organizations for women in science
- National Center for Women & Information Technology
- Women in computing
