= Shubu Mukherjee =

Indian computer architect (born 1986)

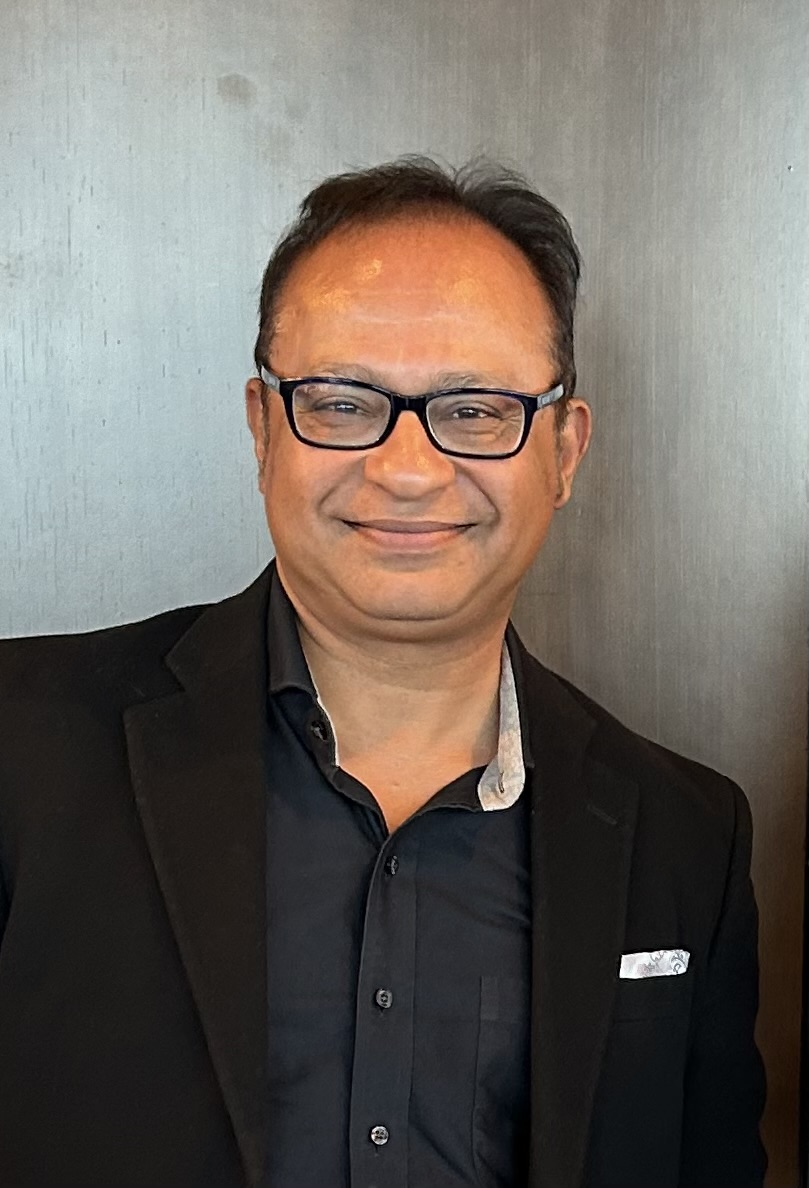
- Born: Kolkata, India
- Known for: Architecture design for soft errors, processor architecture
- Title: Shubu Mukherjee
- Awards: Maurice Wilkes Award, IEEE Fellow, ACM Fellow
- Scientific career
- Workplaces: SiFive, Compaq, Intel, Cavium, and Marvell
- Academic advisors: Mark D. Hill

Shubu Mukherjee (born November 10, 1968), also known as Shubhendu S. Mukherjee., is a pioneer in computer architecture design and analysis techniques.

== Education ==
Mukherjee received his Ph.D degree from the University of Wisconsin-Madison under the supervision of Prof. Mark D. Hill.

== Career ==
His first job immediately after graduation was with the Alpha Architecture group in Digital Equipment Corporation (DEC), where he worked for ten days before Compaq acquired DEC. Mukherjee moved to Intel when the Alpha Architecture group was acquired by Intel Corporation in 2001.

In Intel, in conjunction with Joel Emer, Steven Reinhardt, and others, Mukherjee published one of his well-known papers on architectural vulnerability, which shows how to reason about and design for soft errors in semiconductor chips from cosmic radiation and alpha particles. Subsequently, Mukherjee’s work on soft errors led to Mukherjee’s book on the same topic titled "Architecture Design for Soft Errors."

Mukherjee has worked on most aspects of computer chip design, including as an alpha architect for on-chip networks and coherence protocols, lead architect for ARM-based processor cores used in OCTEON 9x family of processors, reliability architect, and performance architect. Mukherjee has over 50 publications and 100 patents in the field of computer architecture.

He has served as Vice President of Architecture in SiFive, Inc. and in the RISC-V Technical Steering Committee.

== Awards and honors ==
Mukherjee was the 2009 recipient of the Maurice Wilkes award, an Association for Computing Machinery (ACM) award for pioneering contributions to computer and digital systems architecture. He received the 2022 ACM SIGMICRO MICRO Test of Time Award.

He is an ACM Fellow and IEEE Fellow.
