= John L. Hennessy =

American computer scientist (born 1952)

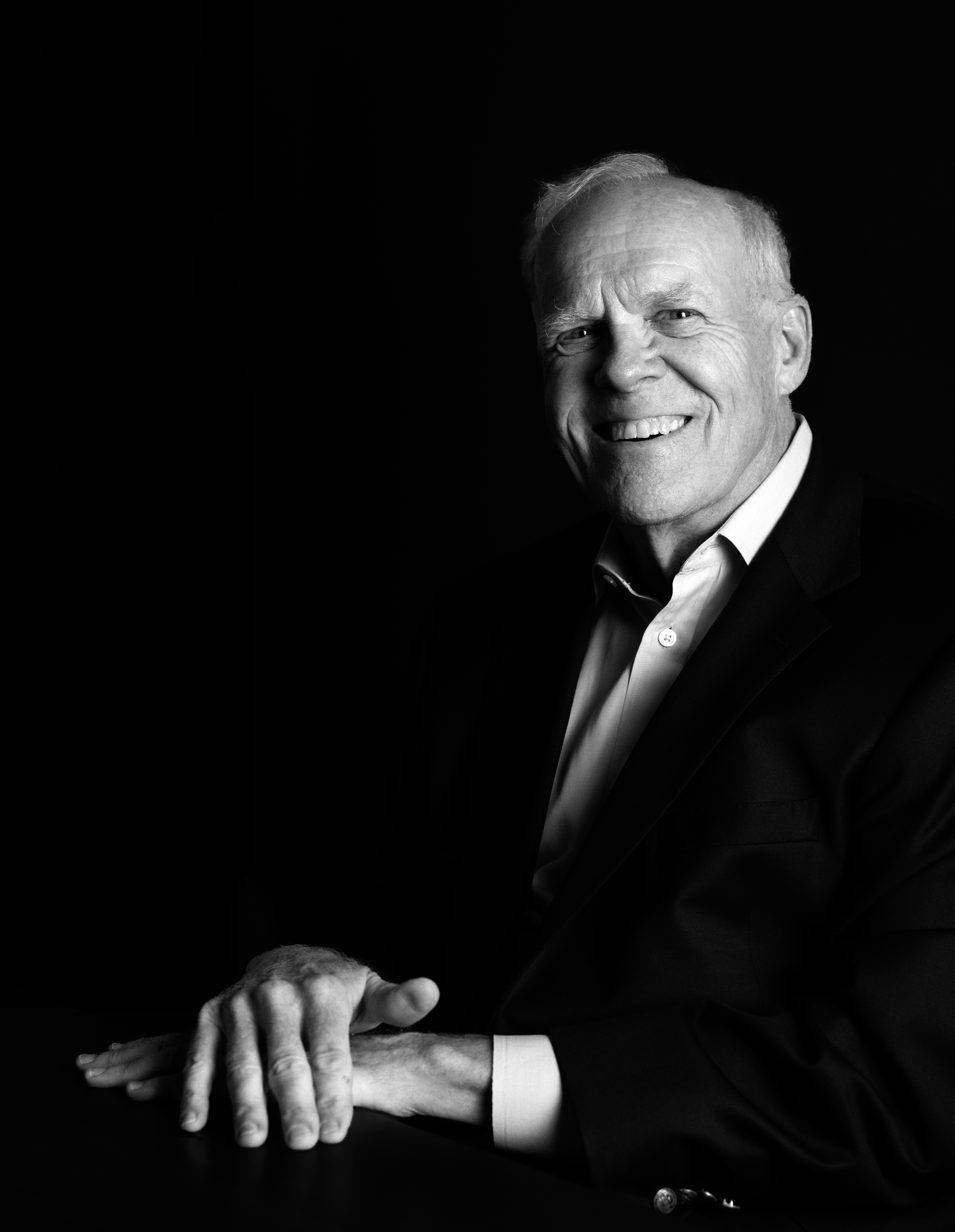
- Hennessy in 2024

10th President of Stanford University
- In office September 1, 2000 – August 31, 2016
- Preceded by: Gerhard Casper
- Succeeded by: Marc Tessier-Lavigne

11th Provost of Stanford University
- In office July 1999 – September 2000
- Preceded by: Condoleezza Rice
- Succeeded by: John Etchemendy

Personal details
- Born: John Leroy Hennessy; September 22, 1952 (age 74) Huntington, New York, U.S.
- Education: Villanova University (BS); Stony Brook University (MS, PhD)
- Known for: Reduced instruction set computer MIPS Technologies; Atheros
- Awards: Charles Stark Draper Prize (2022); Turing Award (2017); BBVA Foundation Frontiers of Knowledge Award (2020); Clark Kerr Award (2020); IEEE Medal of Honor (2012); Member of the National Academy of Sciences (2002); Fellow of the American Academy of Arts and Sciences; ACM Fellow (1997); Fellow of the Royal Academy of Engineering (2017)
- Scientific career
- Fields: Computer architecture
- Thesis: A real-time language for small processors: design, definition and implementation (1977)
- Doctoral advisor: Richard Kieburtz
- Doctoral students: Anant Agarwal; Lawrence Paulson; Josep Torrellas; Norman Jouppi
- Website: hennessy.stanford.edu

John Leroy Hennessy (born September 22, 1952) is an American computer scientist and businessman who has served as the chairman of Alphabet Inc. since 2018. One of the founders of MIPS Technologies and Atheros, he was the 10th president of Stanford University from 2000 to 2016.

Along with David Patterson, Hennessy was a recipient of the 2017 Turing Award for their work in developing the reduced instruction set computer (RISC) architecture, which is now used in 99% of new computer chips. Marc Andreessen has called him "the godfather of Silicon Valley."

== Early life and education ==
Hennessy was raised in Huntington, New York, as one of six children. His father was an aerospace engineer, and his mother was a teacher before raising her children. He is of Irish-Catholic descent, with some of his ancestors arriving in America during the potato famine in the 19th century.

He earned his bachelor's degree in electrical engineering from Villanova University, and his master's degree and Doctor of Philosophy in computer science from Stony Brook University.

== Career and research ==
Hennessy became a Stanford faculty member in 1977. In 1981, he began the MIPS project to investigate RISC processors, following preliminary investigations at Berkeley by David A. Patterson. On 1984, he used his sabbatical year to found MIPS Computer Systems Inc. to commercialize the technology developed by his research. Returning to Stanford, he became the Willard and Inez Kerr Bell Endowed Professor of Electrical Engineering and Computer Science in 1987. In 1988, Hennessy and Patterson began a three-year effort to write the first edition Computer Architecture: A Quantitative Approach, which described RISC instruction sets and cost-performance tradeoffs.

As a full Stanford professor, Hennessy took administrative roles of growing breadth. He was director of Stanford's Computer System Laboratory (1989–93), a research center run by Stanford's Electrical Engineering and Computer Science departments. He was chair of the Department of Computer Science (1994–96) and Dean of the School of Engineering (1996–99). In 1999, Stanford President Gerhard Casper appointed Hennessy to succeed Condoleezza Rice as Provost of Stanford University. When Casper stepped down to focus on teaching in 2000, the Stanford Board of Trustees named Hennessy to succeed Casper as president. In 2008, Hennessy's compensation exceeded $1 million, the 23rd highest among all American university presidents.

Hennessy has been a board member of Google (later Alphabet Inc.), Cisco Systems, Atheros Communications, and the Gordon and Betty Moore Foundation. He was elected to the American Philosophical Society in 2008.

On October 14, 2010, Hennessy was presented a khata by the 14th Dalai Lama before the latter addressed Maples Pavilion.

In December 2010, Hennessy coauthored an editorial with Harvard University President Drew Gilpin Faust urging the passage of the DREAM Act; the legislation did not pass the 111th United States Congress.

In 2013, Hennessy became a judge for the inaugural Queen Elizabeth Prize for Engineering. He has remained on the judging panel for the subsequent awards in 2015 and 2017.

In June 2015, Hennessy announced that he would step down as Stanford president in summer 2016. He was succeeded as president by Marc Tessier-Lavigne.

In 2016, Hennessy co-founded the Knight-Hennessy Scholars program; he serves as its inaugural director. The program has a $750 million endowment to fully fund graduate students at Stanford for up to three years. The inaugural class of 51 scholars from 21 countries arrived at Stanford in the fall of 2018.

In February 2018, Hennessy was announced as the new Chairman of Alphabet Inc., Google's parent company. That same year, his book Leading Matters: Lessons from My Journey was published by Stanford University Press.

Hennessy has a history of strong interest and involvement in college-level computer education. He co-authored, with David Patterson, two well-known books on computer architecture, Computer Organization and Design: the Hardware/Software Interface and Computer Architecture: A Quantitative Approach, which introduced the DLX RISC architecture. They have been widely used as textbooks for graduate and undergraduate courses since 1990.

Hennessy also contributed to updating Donald Knuth's MIX processor to the MMIX. Both are model computers used in Knuth's classic series, The Art of Computer Programming. MMIX is Knuth's DLX equivalent.

=== Awards and honors ===
- Elected to the National Academy of Engineering: 1992 For innovations in computer architecture and software techniques for reduced instruction set computers (RISC), and for quantitative evaluation methods for modern computer architectures.
- IEEE Emanuel R. Piore Award –
  1994 "For contributions to quantitative evaluation of computer architectures and the successful implementation of Reduced Instruction-Set Computer (RISC) architecture."
- Fellow of the Association for Computing Machinery (ACM)
  1997
- Golden Plate Award of the American Academy of Achievement –
  2001
- Association for Computing Machinery SIGARCH ISCA Influential Paper Award –
  2004 1989 co-authored paper on high performing cache hierarchies
- Fellow of the Computer History Museum –
  2007 "for fundamental contributions to engineering education, advances in computer architecture, and the integration of leading-edge research with education"
- IEEE Medal of Honor –
  2012 "for pioneering the RISC processor architecture and for leadership in computer engineering and higher education"
- Honorary Degree in Mathematics, University of Waterloo
  2012 "for profound contributions to modern computer architecture and to post-secondary education"
- Fellow of the Royal Academy of Engineering, (FREng) UK –
  2017
- Turing Award –
  2017 "for pioneering a systematic, quantitative approach to the design and evaluation of computer architectures with enduring impact on the microprocessor industry"
- BBVA Foundation Frontiers of Knowledge Award 2020 in Information and Communication Technologies.
- In 2020, he received from the UC Berkeley Academic Senate the Clark Kerr Award for distinguished leadership in higher education.
- In 2022, he was awarded the Charles Stark Draper Prize by the National Academy of Engineering alongside Steve Furber, David Patterson and Sophie Wilson for contributions to the invention, development, and implementation of reduced instruction set computer (RISC) chips.
- In 2023, he was awarded an honorary doctorate of science by the University of Hong Kong.

=== Selected publications ===
- Computer Architecture: A Quantitative Approach
- Patterson, David A.; Hennessy, John L. (1994). Computer Organization and Design: The Hardware/Software Interface. Morgan Kaufmann. ISBN 978-0-12-370606-5.
- Gharachorloo, Kourosh; D. Lenoski; J. Laudon; P. Gibbons; A. Gupta; J. Hennessy (1990). "Memory consistency and event ordering in scalable shared-memory multiprocessors". Proceedings of the 17th annual international symposium on Computer Architecture. International Symposium on Computer Architecture. pp. 15–26.
- Lenoski, Daniel; J. Laudon; K. Gharachorloo; A. Gupta; J. Hennessy (1990). "The directory-based cache coherence protocol for the DASH multiprocessor". Proceedings of the 17th annual international symposium on Computer Architecture. International Symposium on Computer Architecture. pp. 148–159.

== Personal life ==
Hennessy is married to Andrea Berti, whom he met in high school.

Academic offices
Preceded by Condoleezza Rice	Provost of Stanford University; 1999–2000	Succeeded by John Etchemendy
Preceded by Gerhard Casper	President of Stanford University; 2000–2016	Succeeded by Marc Tessier-Lavigne
