= Alpha strike =

Alpha strike may refer to:

- Alpha strike (engineering), when an alpha particle enters and causes damage to the data contained in a computer processor
- Alpha strike (gaming), a massive, all-out attack, as in a tabletop wargame
- Alpha strike (United States Navy), a large air attack by an aircraft carrier air wing
