= Hackers.mu =

Group of computer programmers

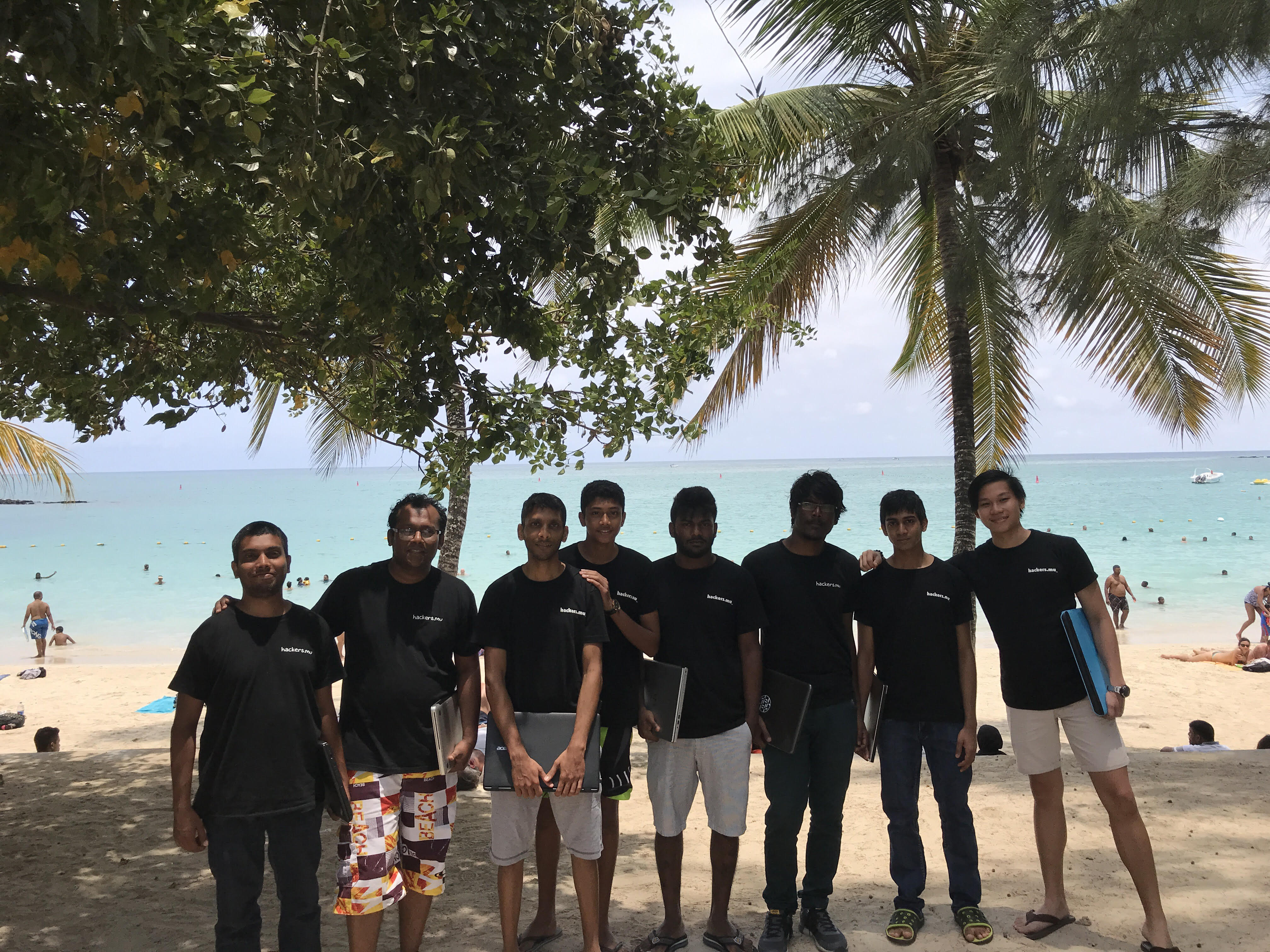
Hackers.mu members participating remotely in the IETF 100 Hackathon

Hackers.mu (stylized in all lowercase) is a group of developers from Mauritius who are focused on computer security, IETF standards and Linux and Open Source Software adoption. They have worked on implementing TLS 1.3 in Linux and Open Source Software during the IETF 100 Hackathon as part of the TLS Working Group. They have also prepared high school students for Google Code-in in 2016 which marked the first time that Mauritius participated. In 2017, they trained another group of high school students, leading to the first grand prize winner for Mauritius. During IETF 101, Hackers.mu acted as TLS 1.3 champions, and continued to work on application integration support. In June 2018, Hackers.mu organized a hackathon with codename "Operation JASK" to fix sigspoof3 in a number of open source projects. In July 2018, Hackers.mu participated in IETF 102 hackathon as TLS 1.3 champions to work on inter-operability and applications support and http 451. Additionally, they have been active in authoring IETF Standards such as RFC 8270.
