= IEEE Computing Edge =

Monthly magazine published by the IEEE Computer Society

- Editor: Cathy Martin
- Categories: Computing
- Frequency: Monthly
- Publisher: IEEE Computer Society
- Founded: 2015
- Country: United States
- Website: www.computer.org/computingedge

ComputingEdge is a monthly magazine published by the IEEE Computer Society since 2015. It contains curated articles from 13 IEEE publications and also features original content related to hot technology topics, providing information regarding current research developments, trends, and changes in the computing technology. Subscriptions of the magazine are provided free of cost as printed copies in the United States and as electronic copies worldwide.
