= Josep Torrellas =

American computer scientist

- Born: 1963 (age 62–63); Montblanc, Spain
- Citizenship: Spain
- Education: Stanford University
- Awards: Harry H. Goode Memorial Award; NSF Young Investigator Award
- Scientific career
- Fields: Electrical Engineering
- Workplaces: University of Illinois
- Thesis: Multiprocessor cache memory performance: Characterization and optimization (1992)
- Doctoral advisor: John L. Hennessy
- Doctoral students: Luis Ceze; Karin Strauss

Josep Torrellas (born 1963 in Montblanc, Spain) is a computer scientist and the Saburo Muroga Professor in the Department of Computer Science at the University of Illinois Urbana-Champaign. He directs the SRC/DARPA JUMP 2.0 ACE Center for Evolvable Computing. His research focuses on computer architecture, parallel computing, and memory systems.

== Education ==
He received a B.S. in electrical engineering from the Universitat Politècnica de Catalunya in 1986 and a Ph.D. in electrical engineering from Stanford University in 1992. His doctoral dissertation was titled Multiprocessor Cache Memory Performance: Characterization and Optimization.

== Academic career and research ==
After receiving his Ph.D. from Stanford University, Torrellas joined the faculty of the University of Illinois Urbana–Champaign in the Department of Computer Science, which later became the Siebel School of Computing and Data Science.

Torrellas's research focuses on computer architecture, particularly shared-memory multiprocessor systems and techniques for increasing parallelism in computing systems. His work has examined issues related to scalable multiprocessor architectures, memory consistency, and mechanisms for improving the performance and reliability of parallel programs.

A major area of his research involves thread-level speculation (TLS), a technique that enables parallel execution of code segments whose dependencies are not fully known in advance. His research group explored speculative multithreading and its applications to synchronization, debugging data races, memory monitoring, and fault tolerance.

Earlier in his career, Torrellas studied false sharing and the cache behavior of operating systems and commercial workloads, work that influenced compiler design and the architecture of early shared-memory multiprocessors such as the SGI Origin 2000.

Torrellas also participated in the design of PERCS, an IBM multiprocessor architecture, and later co-led the Runnemede extreme-scale multiprocessor project developed with Intel to explore energy-efficient high-performance computing systems.

== Awards and honors ==
Torrellas is a Fellow of the Institute of Electrical and Electronics Engineers (IEEE) and the Association for Computing Machinery (ACM). He has received several research awards, including the NSF Young Investigator Award and an IBM Partnership Award.

In 2021, Torrellas received the Harry H. Goode Memorial Award from the IEEE Computer Society for contributions to computer architecture research.

His paper "Speculative Data-Oblivious Execution: Mobilizing Safe Prediction for Safe and Efficient Speculative Execution", written with Jiyong Yu, Namrata Mantri, Adam Morrison and Christopher W. Fletcher and presented at ISCA 2020, won first place in the inaugural Intel Hardware Security Academic Award in 2021.

== Links ==
- Universal Parallel Computing Research Center (UPCRC) at Illinois
- i-acoma Architecture Group at the University of Illinois
- Illinois OpenSPARC Center
- Josep Torrellas's Homepage
- Parallel Computing Research at Illinois: The UPCRC Agenda
- Illinois Department of Computer Science
