= International Symposium on Computer Architecture =

Academic conference on computer architecture

ISCA, International Symposium on Computer Architecture
- Status: Active
- Genre: Computer Architecture Conference
- Inaugurated: 1973
- Most recent: 2025 (Tokyo, Japan)
- Organizer: ACM SIGARCH and IEEE Computer Society
- Website: iscaconf.org

The International Symposium on Computer Architecture (ISCA) is an annual academic conference on computer architecture, generally viewed as the top-tier in the field. Association for Computing Machinery's Special Interest Group on Computer Architecture (ACM SIGARCH) and Institute of Electrical and Electronics Engineers Computer Society are technical sponsors.

ISCA Hall of Fame provides a list of the most prolific authors at the ISCA conference, spanning contributions starting from the first ISCA conference in 1973.

ISCA has participated in the Federated Computing Research Conference in 1993, 1996, 1999, 2003, 2007, 2011, 2015, 2019, and 2023; every year that the conference has been organized.

ISCA 2018 hosted the 2017 Turing Award Winners lecture by award winners John L. Hennessy and David A. Patterson.

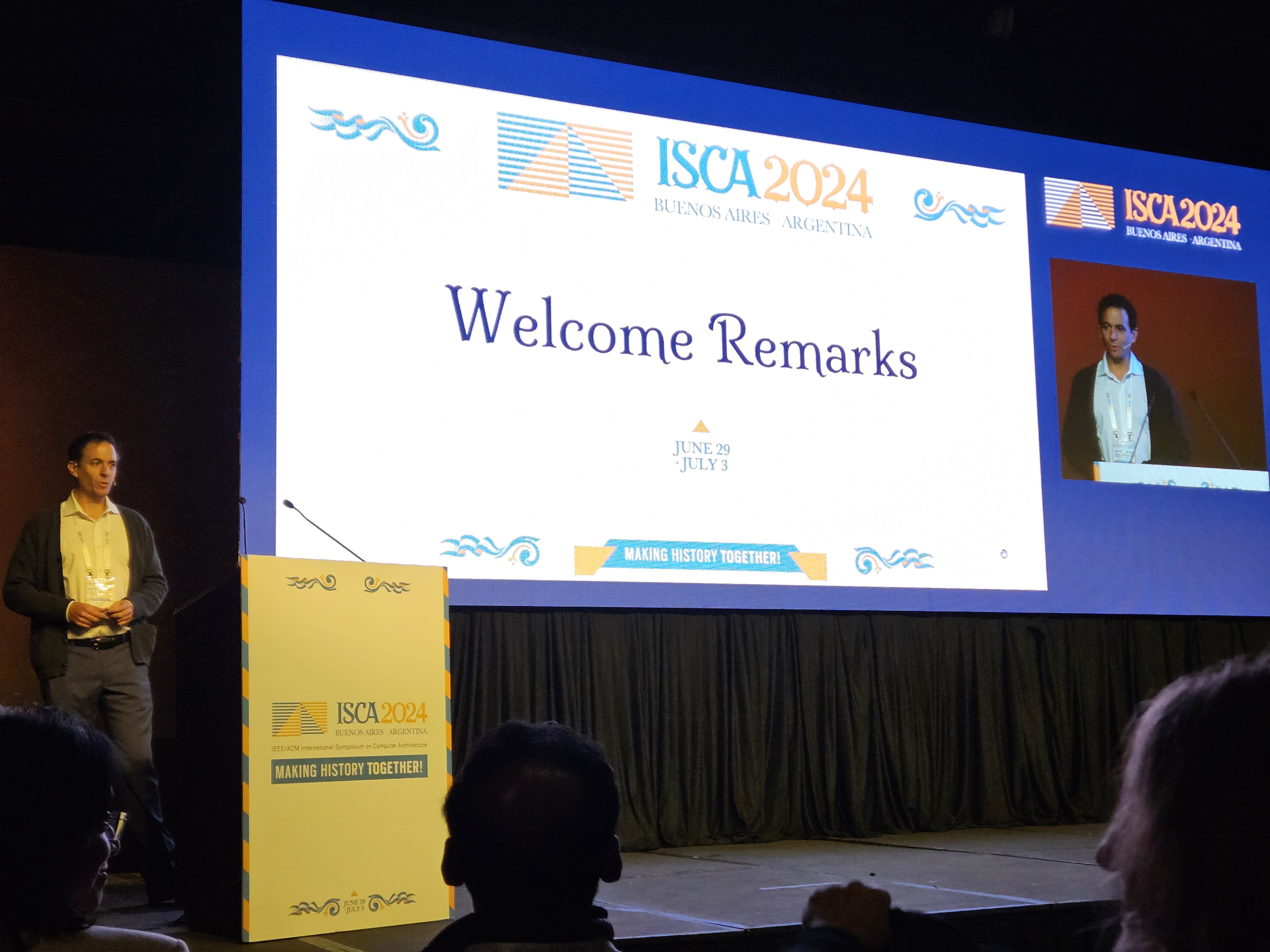
ISCA'24 opening

ISCA 2024, which was held in Buenos Aires (Argentina), was the first edition ever to take place in a Latin American country. It featured keynote speakers Mateo Valero, Sridhar Iyengar, and Vivienne Sze. The organization of this edition was led by Prof. Esteban Mocskos (University of Buenos Aires) and Dr. Augusto Vega (IBM T. J. Watson Research Center).

ISCA 2025 was held in Tokyo (Japan), registering a record number of attendees (1200+).

== Influential Paper Award ==
The ISCA Influential Paper Award is presented annually at ISCA by SIGARCH and TCCA. The award is given for the paper with the most impact in the field (in the area of research, development, products, or ideas) from the conference 15 years ago.

Prior recipients include:

- 2022 (For ISCA 2007): Xiaobo Fan, Wolf-Dietrich Weber, Luiz André Barroso. "Power Provisioning for a Warehouse-sized Computer"
- 2021 (For ISCA 2006): James Donald, Margaret Martonosi. "Techniques for Multicore Thermal Management: Classification and New Exploration"
- 2020 (For ISCA 2005): Rakesh Kumar, Victor V. Zyuban, Dean M. Tullsen. "Interconnections in Multi-Core Architectures: Understanding Mechanisms, Overheads and Scaling"
- 2019 (For ISCA 2004): Lance Hammond, Vicky Wong, Mike Chen, Brian D. Carlstrom, John D. Davis, Ben Hertzberg, Manohar K. Prabhu, Honggo Wijaya, Christos Kozyrakis, Kunle Olukotun. "Transactional Memory Coherence and Consistency"
- 2018 (For ISCA 2003): Kevin Skadron, Mircea R. Stan, Karthik Sankaranarayanan, Wei Huang, Sivakumar Velusamy, David Tarjan. "Temperature-Aware Microarchitecture"
- 2017 (2002) - Krisztian Flautner, Nam Sung Kim, Steven Martin, David Blaauw, Trevor Mudge. "Drowsy caches: simple techniques for reducing leakage power"
- 2016 (2001) - Brian Fields, Shai Rubin, Rastislav Bodík,
- 2015 (2000) - David Brooks, Vivek Tiwari, and Margaret Martonosi,
- 2014 (1999) - Seth Copen Goldstein, Herman Schmit, Matthew Moe, Mihai Budiu, Srihari Cadambi, R. Reed Taylor, and Ronald Laufer
- 2013 (1998) - Srilatha Manne, Artur Klauser, Dirk Grunwald,
- 2012 (1997) - Subbarao Palacharla, Norman P. Jouppi, James E. Smith
- 2011 (1996) - Dean M. Tullsen, Susan J. Eggers, Joel S. Emer, Henry M. Levy, Jack L. Lo, and Rebecca L. Stamm
- 2010 (1995) - Dean M. Tullsen, Susan J. Eggers, and Henry M. Levy
- 2009 (1994) - Jeffrey Kuskin, David Ofelt, Mark Heinrich, John Heinlein, Richard Simoni, Kourosh Gharachorloo, John Chapin, David Nakahira, Joel Baxter, Mark Horowitz, Anoop Gupta, Mendel Rosenblum, and John L. Hennessy
- 2008 (1993) - Maurice Herlihy and J. Eliot B. Moss,
- 2007 (1992) - Tse-Yu Yeh and Yale N. Patt
- 2006 (1991) - Pohua P. Chang, Scott A. Mahlke, William Y. Chen, Nancy J. Warter, and Wen-mei W. Hwu
- 2005 (1990) - Norman P. Jouppi,
- 2004 (1989) - Steven Przybylski, John L. Hennessy, and Mark Horowitz
- 2003 (1988) - Jean-Loup Baer and Wen-Hann Wang
