= August Penguin =

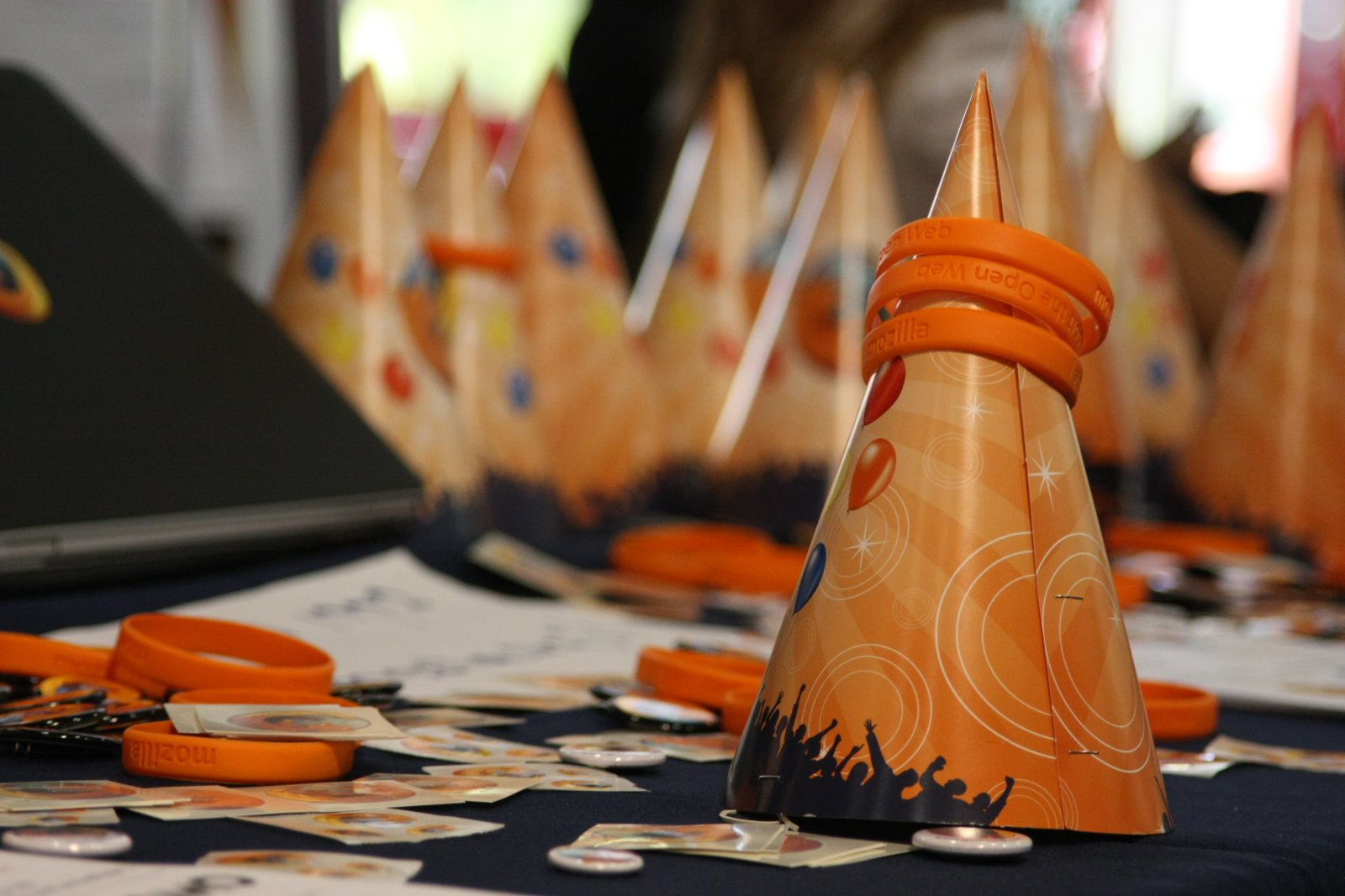
A Mozilla Firefox hat in the Mozilla booth at August Penguin 2009

August Penguin is an annual gathering (since 2002) of the Israeli Free Software community, organized by Hamakor. The conference is held on the first Friday in August (hence its name), usually in the Tel Aviv area. It lasts one day and includes technical talks, projects' status updates, social meetings and followed by a keysigning party.

During the conference, the winner of Hamakor Prize for free software-related achievements is announced.

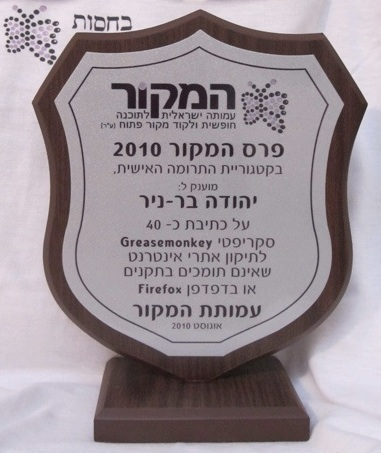
Hamakor's prize 2010 in the personal contribution category

Year	Winner	Activity
2004	Maxim Iorsh	Culmus project providing high-quality Hebrew fonts
2005	Yael Vaya Talmor	Creating Free-software-based computer rooms in schools
2006	no prize awarded	
2007	no prize awarded	
2008	Meir Kriheli	Creating and running whatsup
2009	Gábor Szabó; Shachar Shemesh; Tomer Cohen; The education department of Petah Tikva	Organizing some Perl conferences and meetings in Israel; Contribution to the Israeli community; Localization of Firefox; Adopting Open source for the city's education system.
2010	Yehuda Bar-Nir; Blogli's website team; The Department of Software Engineering, Shenkar College of Engineering and Design	Writing 40 Greasemonkey scripts for making sure web sites operate well in Firefox; Building a free (as in gratis) blogging website based on WordPress MU and encouraging the use of free software for a blogging platform.; Hebrew translation and support for Moodle
2011	Nadav Har'El	Participating in the development of Hspell, the free software Hebrew spell checker

== See also ==
- List of computer-related awards
