= Kevin Skadron =

American computer scientist

Kevin Skadron is an American computer scientist, the Harry Douglas Forsyth Professor of Computer Science. He served as department chair and served as Director of the SRC JUMP Center for Research on Intelligent Storage and Processing in Memory (CRISP), and the Center for Automata Processing (CAP), at the University of Virginia, Charlottesville, Virginia. His research focuses on computer processor design and memory system design under physical constraints such as temperature, power, and reliability. He and his colleagues have contributed numerous tools now widely used in the research community, including the HotSpot family of tools, the Rodinia Benchmark Suite, and the PIMeval/PIMbench/PIM API for processing in memory. Skadron also helped co-found IEEE Computer Architecture Letters and served as editor-in-chief from 2010 to 2012.

== Education and career ==
Skadron received his BS in Electrical and Computer Engineering and his BA in economics from Rice University in 1994. He then moved to Princeton University, pursuing doctoral research in Computer Science, with Doug Clark as his dissertation advisor and Margaret Martonosi as co-advisor. He earned his PhD in 1999. He became an assistant professor of computer science at the University of Virginia in August 1999. He served as department chair from 2012 to 2021. He has graduated over 25 advised/co-advised Ph.D. students.

== Awards and honors ==
Skadron received the SRC/SIA University Research Award in 2023 for lifetime research contributions to the U.S. semiconductor industry and the ACM SIGARCH Maurice Wilkes Award in 2011 for outstanding contributions to thermal-aware computer architecture modeling and design, and was named Fellow of the Institute of Electrical and Electronics Engineers (IEEE) in 2013 for contributions to thermal modeling in microprocessors, and ACM Fellow for contributions in power- and thermal-aware modeling, design and benchmarking of microprocessors, including GPUs. He was also elected to the Virginia Academy of Science, Engineering, and Medicine in 2025.
