= Luis Ceze =

Brazilian computer scientist

Luis H Ceze
- Born: São Paulo, Brazil
- Education: University of São Paulo (B.Eng, M.Eng); University of Illinois Urbana-Champaign (Ph.D)
- Occupations: Professor, computer scientist
- Known for: Co-founder of OctoAI (formerly OctoML)
- Partner: Karin Strauss
- Scientific career
- Thesis: Bulk Operation and Data Coloring for Multiprocessor Programmability (2007)
- Doctoral advisor: Josep Torrellas
- Website: Official website

Luis Ceze is a Brazilian-born American computer scientist, businessman, and academic. Ceze was the CEO and co-founder of OctoAI, a machine learning-focused startup acquired by Nvidia. Following its acquisition, he became a vice president of AI systems software at Nvidia.

Ceze is a professor of computer science at the Paul G. Allen School of Computer Science & Engineering at the University of Washington. He is known for his work on Apache TVM and bioinspired systems for data storage.

== Education ==
Ceze attended the University of São Paulo, where he received his Bachelor of Engineering degree in 2000 and his Master of Engineering degree in 2001. from the University of São Paulo.

After this, he pursued a doctoral degree in computer science from the University of Illinois Urbana-Champaign, advised by Josep Torrellas. He received his Ph.D. in 2007 with a thesis titled Bulk Operation and Data Coloring for Multiprocessor Programmability.

== Career ==
=== OctoAI ===
In 2019, Ceze founded OctoML, a startup aimed at optimizing machine learning deployments. OctoML launched OctoAI, a generative AI product, in June 2023. The company itself changed its name to OctoAI by January 2024, with Ceze explaining that it was renamed to "eliminate potential confusion between our product and corporate name".

He stated that OctoAI had thousands of users in a January 2024 statement. In June 2024, OctoAI launched OctoStack, a product designed to help customers customize AI models. In September 2024, The Information reported that Nvidia has considered an acquisition of OctoAI for $165 million. Nvidia went on to acquire OctoAI on September 25. Following OctoAI's acquisition, Ceze became a vice president of AI systems software at Nvidia, and remained in his position at the University of Washington.

=== Other ventures ===
In 2008, Ceze cofounded Corensic after spinning it off from the University of Washington. The startup was acquired by F5 Networks in 2012. In 2018, he joined Madrona Venture Group as a venture partner.

== Awards ==
- NSF Career Award (2009)
- Sloan Research Fellowship (2010)
- IEEE TCCA Young Computer Architect Award (2013)
- Maurice Wilkes Award (2020)
- ACM Fellow (2022)
