= Margaret Martonosi =

American computer scientist

Margaret Rose Martonosi
- Born: Boston, Massachusetts, US
- Education: Cornell University; Stanford University
- Known for: computer architecture and mobile computing
- Awards: National Academy Engineering Member (2021); American Academy of Arts and Sciences Member (2020); ACM Fellow (2009); IEEE Fellow (2010); ACM-IEEE CS Eckert-Mauchly Award (2021)
- Scientific career
- Fields: Computer Science
- Workplaces: Stanford University; Princeton University
- Thesis: Analyzing and tuning memory performance in sequential and parallel programs (1994)
- Doctoral advisor: Anoop Gupta; Thomas E. Anderson
- Doctoral students: Kevin Skadron
- Website: www.princeton.edu/~mrm

Margaret Rose Martonosi is an American computer scientist who is currently the Hugh Trumbull Adams '35 Professor of Computer Science at Princeton University. Martonosi is noted for her research in computer architecture and mobile computing with a particular focus on power-efficiency.

She is also noted for her leadership in broadening participation in computing. She was co-chair of the CRA-W Board from 2016-2017. From 2016 to 2022, she was an Andrew Dickson White professor-at-large at Cornell University.

On September 23, 2019, the National Science Foundation announced that Martonosi had been selected to serve as head of the Directorate for Computer and Information Science and Engineering (CISE) at NSF. She served from February 1, 2020 through December 2023.

== Biography ==
Margaret Rose Martonosi was born in Boston, Massachusetts. She received a B.S. in Electrical Engineering from Cornell University in 1986. She received a M.S. in Electrical Engineering from Stanford University in 1987 and a Ph.D in Electrical Engineering from Stanford University in 1993.

After a brief post-doc at Stanford, she joined the Department of Electrical Engineering at Princeton University in 1994 as an assistant professor. She was promoted to associate professor in 2000 and to professor in 2004. In 2010 she moved to the Computer Science Department at Princeton University.

== Career ==
In the area of power-aware computer architecture, Martonosi is known for her work on the Wattch power modeling infrastructure. Among the first architecture-level power modeling tools, Wattch demonstrated that early-stage power modeling tools could be accurate enough to allow computer architects to assess processor power consumption early enough in the design process for power to have a substantive influence on design choices. Martonosi's group has also performed research on real-system power measurement, and on power and thermal management.

In the area of mobile systems, some of Martonosi's early work included the design and deployment of mobile sensors for tracking zebras in Kenya This work demonstrated the use of delay tolerant protocols and low-power GPS devices for wildlife tracking. More recently, Martonosi has researched human mobility patterns and has developed novel mobile applications for crowdsourcing traffic information.

== Awards ==
In 2009 she was named an ACM Fellow "for contributions in power-aware computing."

In 2010, she was named an IEEE Fellow "for contributions to power-efficient computer architecture and systems design."

In 2015, she was named a Jefferson Science Fellow and served in the Bureau of Economic and Business Affairs at the United States Department of State. She won the 2015 ISCA Influential Paper Award for her co-authored paper describing a framework for architectural-level power analysis and optimizations.

In 2017 she received the SIGMOBILE Test-of-Time Award for the ASPLOS 2002 paper entitled "Energy-Efficient Computing for Wildlife Tracking: Design Tradeoffs and Early Experiences with ZebraNet," with co-authors Philo Juang, Hidekazu Oki, Yong Wang, Li-Shiuan Peh, and Daniel Rubenstein.

In 2020 she became a member of the American Academy of Arts and Sciences.

In 2021, Martonosi was elected as a member of the National Academy of Engineering "for contributions to power-aware and power-efficient computer architectures and mobile systems".

In June 2021, Martonosi won the ACM-IEEE CS Eckert-Mauchly Award "for contributions in power-aware computing."

On May 29, 2024, Martonosi won the 2023 ACM Frances E. Allen Award for Outstanding Mentoring. Martonosi is recognized for her mentoring at Princeton University, in computer architecture, and in the broader computer science community.

Her other notable awards include:

- Semiconductor Research Corporation (SRC) Aristotle Award for graduate research advising 2019
- ACM SIGARCH Alan D. Berenbaum Distinguished Service Award 2019
- IEEE International Conference on High-Performance Computer Architecture Test of Time Paper Award 2018
- IEEE Computer Society Technical Achievement Award 2018
- ACM Sensys Test of Time Award 2017
- Marie R. Pistilli Women in EDA Achievement Award 2015
- Grace Hopper Celebration of Women in Computing Technical Leadership ABIE Award Winner 2013
- NCWIT Undergraduate Mentor Award in May 2013
- Best Paper award at the Ninth International Conference on Mobile Systems, Applications and Services (MobiSys), in Washington, D. C. in June 2011. The paper was SignalGuru: Leveraging Mobile Phones for Collaborative Traffic Signal Schedule Advisory. Her co-authors were Emmanouil Koukoumidis and Li-Shiuan Peh.
- Best paper award at MICRO-38 for the paper titled A Dynamic Compilation Framework for Controlling Microprocessor Energy and Performance in 2005
