= Karin Strauss =

American computer engineer

Karin Strauss is a Brazilian-American computer engineer, a senior principal research manager at Microsoft Research, and an affiliate professor in the Paul G. Allen School of Computer Science and Engineering at the University of Washington. Her research concerns computer architecture, green computing, and unconventional computing including DNA digital data storage.

== Education and career ==
When Strauss and Luis Ceze were undergraduates together at the University of São Paulo in Brazil, they visited several research institutions in the US, and were jointly recruited to internships at IBM Research by José E. Moreira. Strauss earned bachelor's and master's degrees in engineering at the University of São Paulo in 2001 and 2002, and, with Ceze, took Moreira's offer, eventually staying at IBM for 13 months instead of the planned three months. Following this, they became doctoral students at the University of Illinois Urbana-Champaign. Strauss completed her Ph.D. in 2007. Her dissertation, Cache Coherence in Embedded-Ring Multiprocessors, was supervised by Josep Torrellas; she also credits Xiaowei Shen as being "practically my co-advisor".

Following the completion of their doctorates, Ceze joined the University of Washington in 2007, while Strauss worked at AMD for two years before joining Microsoft Research in 2009, solving their two-body problem as both the University of Washington and Microsoft Research are located in Seattle. Together they co-direct the Molecular Information Systems Laboratory, a joint research project of Microsoft Research and the University of Washington.

== Recognition ==
Strauss and Ceze were the joint recipients of the 2020 Maurice Wilkes Award, for their work on DNA storage, the first time the award was given jointly. Strauss was named an IEEE Fellow, in the 2024 class of fellows, "for contributions to storage systems".
