= Valerie Barr =

American computer scientist

- Education: Rutgers University
- Known for: Work in Women in Computing
- Awards: ACM Distinguished Member
- Scientific career
- Fields: Computer Science
- Workplaces: Bard College, Mount Holyoke College

Valerie Barr is an American computer scientist, and is the Margaret Hamilton Distinguished Professor of Computer Science at Bard College. She formerly held the Jean Sammet endowed chair in the department of Computer Science at Mount Holyoke College in South Hadley, Massachusetts. She is known for her work with women in computing.

== Education ==
Barr earned her Bachelor of Science in Applied mathematics from Mount Holyoke in 1977, her Masters in Computer Science from New York University in 1979, and earned her PhD in Computer Science in 1996 from Rutgers University.

== Career ==
Barr is currently the first person to be the Margaret Hamilton Distinguished Professor of Computer Science at Bard College. She was appointed to this position in July, 2022. In addition to teaching Computer Science courses, in this role she is focused on two issues: 1) how do we ensure that non-CS students using computing in their courses come away with a strong understanding of foundational concepts of computing, and 2) what is it that all students should know about computing in order to actively critique and challenge the current pace and impact of technological change?

Previously, in 2017, Barr was named the first person to hold the Jean E. Sammet Chair in Computer Science at Mount Holyoke College. She left this position in 2022 to take up the position at Bard College.

Barr taught at Hofstra University on Long Island for nine years before becoming department chair at Union College in 2004 where she worked on updating the introductory courses in computer science to appeal to underrepresented groups in computer science and to broaden non-major exposure to the field of computer science.

In 1999, Barr was the recipient of the NSF POWRE award, and in 2007, she was awarded the NSF Computer and Information Science and Engineering (CISE) Pathways to Revitalized Undergraduate Computing Education (CPATH) Institutional Transformation Award. Additional NSF funding was awarded in the form of two awards in 2019: Evaluating Frameworks for Incorporating Computing Across the Curriculum and The Data Science WAV: Experiential Learning with Local Community Organizations. Barr is also a co-PI of the NSF INCLUDES Alliance for Identity-Inclusive Computing Education (AiiCE)

In 2008, Barr and Elaine Weyuker organized a major ACM-W initiative to provide scholarships to women students who want to attend research conferences. This program is still running and annually provides between 30 and 40 scholarships a year for women students from around the world who are interested in attending conferences that will help them further their interests in computing. In 2016, she served as an Academic Corner Speaker at the Anita Borg Institute international conference Grace Hopper Celebration of Women in Computing.

From 2012–2017, she served as the chair of ACM's Council on Women in Computing. She served as a program director at the United States National Science Foundation in the Division of Undergraduate Education during 2013–2014. Her work as program director ended early as a result of questions related to political activity in the 1980s.

Barr became an ACM Senior Member in 2009 and earned the 2016 Outstanding Contribution to ACM Award for broadening the impact of ACM-W, increasing its effectiveness in supporting women in computing worldwide, and encouraging participation in ACM.. In 2019, Barr was named an ACM Distinguished Member. In 2022 she was elected a Fellow of the AAAS.

== Selected publications ==
- 2022. Legacy, C., Zieffler, A., Baumer, B., Barr, V. & Horton, N. Facilitating Team-Based Data Science -- Lessons Learned from the DSC-WAV Project. Foundations of Data Science, Feb 2022.
- 2022. Barr, V. What Must All Post-secondary Students Learn About Computing?, Communications of the ACM, Volume 65, Issue 11, November 2022, pp 29–31, https://doi.org/10.1145/3563968
- 2022. Horton, N. J., Baumer, B. S., Zieffler, A., & Barr, V. (n.d.). The Data Science Corps Wrangle-Analyze-Visualize Program: Building Data Acumen for Undergraduate Students. Harvard Data Science Review. https://hdsr.mitpress.mit.edu/pub/nvflcexe/release/1
- 2019. Beaury, E., Finn, J., Corbin, J., Barr, V., & Bradley, B. Biotic resistance to invasion is ubiquitous across ecosystems of the U.S., Ecology Letters, 2019, DOI: 10.111/ele.13446
- 2017. Barr, Valerie, Gender diversity in computing: are we making any progress?, Communications of the ACM, Volume 60 Issue 4, April 2017, Pages 5–5.
- 2011. Barr, Valerie, and Chris Stephenson, Bringing computational thinking to K-12: what is Involved and what is the role of the computer science education community?, ACM Inroads, Volume 2 Issue 1, March 2011, Pages 48–54.
- 2010. Allan, Vicki, Barr, Valerie, et al. Computational thinking in high school courses. Proceedings of the 41st ACM technical symposium on Computer science education. ACM, 2010.
- 2000. Gonzalez, Avelino J., and Valerie Barr, Validation and verification of intelligent systems-What are they and how are they different?, Journal of Experimental & Theoretical Artificial Intelligence, 12.4 (2000): 407–420.

== See also ==
- Association for Computing Machinery's Council on Women in Computing (ACM-W)
- Mount Holyoke College
- Women in computing
