= Leading Matters: Lessons from My Journey =

2018 book by John L. Hennessy

- Cover
- Author: John L. Hennessy
- Language: English
- Subject: Leadership, Business, Education
- Genre: Business memoir
- Publisher: Stanford Business Books (Stanford University Press)
- Publication date: September 4, 2018
- Publication place: United States
- Pages: 200 (186 pages main text)
- ISBN: 978-1-5036-0801-6
- Dewey Decimal: 658.4/092
- LC Class: HD57.7 .H4457 2018

Leading Matters: Lessons from My Journey is a 2018 book by John L. Hennessy. Hennessy presents ten principles of leadership based on his career in academia and the technology industry. The book discusses concepts including humility, authenticity, service, empathy, courage, collaboration, innovation, intellectual curiosity, storytelling, and legacy through personal anecdotes from the author's experiences at Stanford, MIPS Computer Systems, and various Silicon Valley companies. Hennessy wrote the book following his Stanford presidency to inform the curriculum of the Knight-Hennessy Scholars, which he co-founded with Phil Knight. The work includes a foreword by Walter Isaacson and concludes with a list of books from Hennessy's personal library organized by topic. The book was selected among the Best Leadership Books of 2018 by LeadershipNow.

== Background ==
Hennessy served as Stanford University's tenth president from 2000 to 2016, following roles as provost, dean of engineering, and computer science department chair. He joined Stanford's faculty as an assistant professor in 1977 and co-founded MIPS Computer Systems in the 1980s. During his presidency, he oversaw fundraising campaigns and changes to financial aid programs, which dramatically enhanced accessibility and affordability. After stepping down from the presidency, Hennessy became chairman of Alphabet Inc. and co-founded the Knight-Hennessy Scholars program with Nike founder Phil Knight, who contributed $400 million to the initiative.

The book was written during Hennessy's transition from the Stanford presidency to his role as director of the Knight-Hennessy Scholars. In interviews, Hennessy stated he wrote the work to organize his thoughts on leadership and to help develop curriculum for the scholars program. He indicated that his observations were shaped by what he viewed as leadership challenges in government, corporations, and nonprofit organizations. The author noted that his approach differed from conventional business leadership literature by presenting lessons he considered counterintuitive, drawn from his experiences in both Silicon Valley and academic administration. Hennessy described the writing process as an opportunity to examine key events from his career from a different perspective and to begin a conversation about leadership in the twenty-first century.

== Summary ==
The book presents Hennessy's reflections on leadership based on his experiences as an entrepreneur, Stanford University president, and technology industry leader. The book analyzes ten core elements of leadership through personal anecdotes and observations from Hennessy's career spanning academia, Silicon Valley startups, and university administration.

The work begins by establishing humility as the foundation for effective leadership. Hennessy argues that genuine confidence stems not from ego but from recognizing one's limitations and the contributions of others. He illustrates this through his experiences at MIPS Computer Systems and interactions with Silicon Valley entrepreneur Jim Clark, emphasizing how acknowledging what one doesn't know enables better decision-making and team building.

The book then considers authenticity and trust as essential ingredients for leadership effectiveness. Hennessy discusses the challenge of maintaining authenticity across different constituencies while building trust relationships. He recounts his journey from professor to university president, and described how authentic leadership requires identifying admirable virtues and working to embody them, rather than simply following one's impulses.

In studying leadership as service, Hennessy inverts traditional organizational hierarchies, arguing that leaders exist to serve their teams and institutions rather than the reverse. He references Stanford's founding mission and describes various service initiatives, including the Stanford Charter School and Community Law Clinic, to demonstrate how institutions can extend their core missions to serve broader communities.

The author describes initiatives like the Stanford Teacher Education Program's loan forgiveness program and increased financial aid for low-income students, and shows how empathy, when balanced with equity and institutional mission, can drive meaningful change.

Hennessy recounts several pivotal moments requiring courage, including Stanford's response to the 2008 financial crisis, the aftermath of 9/11, and the decision to walk away from a high-profile New York campus proposal when negotiations violated core university values.

The middle chapters shift focus to methods for creating institutional transformation. Collaboration and teamwork are presented through examples ranging from the MIPS research project to Hennessy's sixteen-year partnership with Provost John Etchemendy. The author here details unconventional collaborations with donors like John Arrillaga and the Anderson family that resulted in major campus improvements.

Hennessy also contrasts academic and industrial approaches to change. He investigates the symbiotic relationship between universities and industry, using examples from Stanford's role in Silicon Valley's development and companies like Google to illustrate how innovation requires both freedom to explore and practical application.

The importance of intellectual curiosity throughout a leader's career forms another key theme. Hennessy describes his extensive reading in history and biography, particularly of leaders like Washington, Lincoln, and Franklin Delano Roosevelt, as crucial to his development. He argues that continuous learning enables leaders to engage meaningfully across diverse fields and adapt to changing circumstances.

Storytelling emerges as a significant tool for communicating vision and inspiring action. The book demonstrates how stories, from Stanford's founding narrative to contemporary student success stories, create emotional connections that facts and figures cannot achieve. Hennessy illustrates this through his use of storytelling in fundraising campaigns and in launching the Knight-Hennessy Scholars.

The final chapter addresses legacy, arguing that leaders should focus on making meaningful contributions rather than consciously building their legacies. Hennessy reflects on his decision to step down from the presidency to lead Knight-Hennessy Scholars, viewing it as an opportunity to develop future global leaders rather than a capstone to his career.

Hennessy weaves together experiences from his roles as computer science professor, MIPS cofounder, Stanford administrator, and board member of major technology companies. He compares leadership challenges in academia and industry while acknowledging their distinct cultures and constraints. The book concludes with Hennessy's transition to founding director of the Knight-Hennessy Scholars, presenting it as a new beginning rather than a culmination of his career. The book includes a substantial coda listing influential books from Hennessy's personal library, organized by topic.

== Critical reception ==
Carol Elsen reviewed the book for the Library Journal noticing that while leadership books are commonplace, Hennessy's work distinguished itself by bridging both education and entrepreneurship, offering what she called "a refreshing perspective" on these fields. Elsen observed that the author maintained authenticity by sharing failures alongside achievements and drew extensively from his reading of historical figures. She welcomed the inclusion of a bonus reading list spanning from ancient classics to contemporary fiction as a notable feature.

In her review for The Center for Association Leadership, Kristin Clarke described the work as "a fascinating look at the professional growth curve of one of the most influential leaders in the tech world and academia." Clarke identified the book's philosophical and personal tone as a key characteristic, observing how Hennessy grounded his leadership principles in core values of humility, authenticity, service, and empathy. She considered that the author successfully parsed his 25 years of leadership experience into ten distinct elements, with courage serving as both principle and practice.

LeadershipNow focused on the practical applicability of Hennessy's insights. The review stated that "the elements are relevant to any leader at any level." The review examined each of the ten leadership elements presented, from foundational traits like humility and authenticity to operational practices such as collaboration and innovation. The reviewer highlighted Hennessy's observation that "the higher up you go the crises just get bigger and come faster," and pointed out that the book centered on the leadership journey rather than abstract theory, with stories demonstrating what worked and what failed in practice.

In his review for China Daily, Yang Yang focused on the book's relevance to knowledge-intensive organizations. Yang pointed out to Yang Bin's observation that Hennessy offers "a university president-style leader" as a new leadership model. The review emphasized Hennessy's core principles of authenticity and trust, quoting his assertion that leaders must be willing to share "unpleasant truths" and "unfortunate incidents" for organizational growth.

=== Computer History Museum book lunch ===
The Computer History Museum described the book as containing "inspired stories" from what it called "a Silicon Valley icon," stating that readers would find "fresh insights" even if already familiar with Hennessy's career. The museum hosted a book launch event on September 20, 2018, featuring Hennessy in conversation with former Yahoo CEO Marissa Mayer.

== Translation ==
A Chinese translation was published by Cheers Publishing in 2020, with Yang Bin, director of the Leadership Research Center at Tsinghua University, serving as one of the translators. The Chinese edition's launch featured an online event with Hennessy, Yang Bin, and publisher Han Yan. They discussed the book's applicability to knowledge-intensive organizations.
