= Google Code-in =

Programming competition hosted by Google LLC

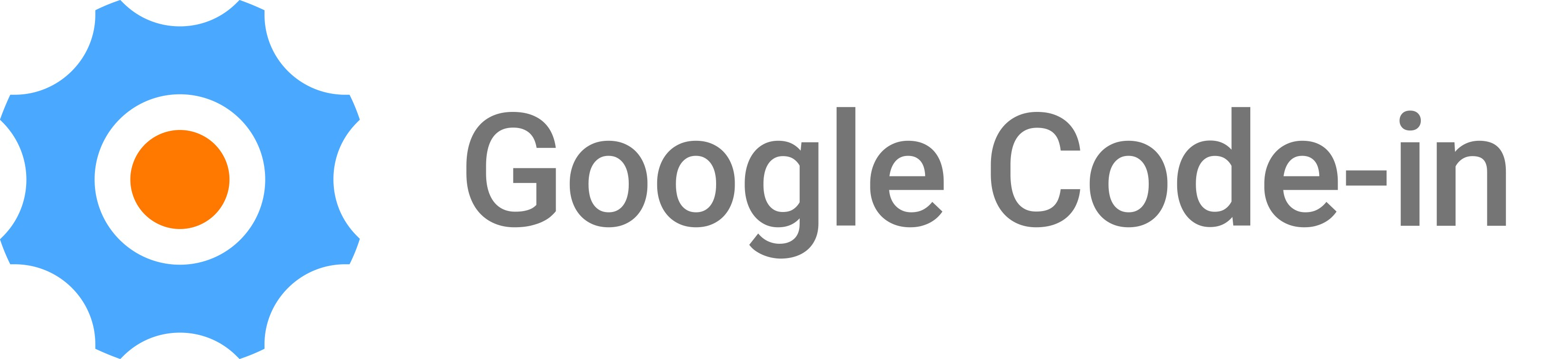
- Google Code-in logo for 2016
- Inaugurated: 2010
- Most recent: 2019
- Participants: ~3000
- Organiser: Google LLC
- Website: codein.withgoogle.com

Google Code-in (GCI) was an international annual programming competition hosted by Google LLC that allowed pre-university students to complete tasks specified by various, partnering open source organizations. The contest was originally the Google Highly Open Participation Contest, but in 2010, the format was modified. Students that completed tasks won certificates and T-shirts. Each organization also selected two grand prize award winners who would earn a free trip to Google's Headquarters located in Mountain View, California. In 2020, Google announced cancellation of the contest.

== History ==
The program began as Google Highly Open Participation Contest during 2007–2008 aimed at high school students. The contest was designed to encourage high school students to participate in open source projects. In 2010, the program was modified into Google Code-in. After the 2014 edition, the Google Melange was replaced by a separate website for Google Code-in. Mauritius, an African country, participated for the first time in 2016, and was noticed for its strong debut and in 2017, produced its first Grand Prize winner.

The contest was open to students thirteen years of age or older who were then enrolled in high school (or equivalent pre-university or secondary school program). Prizes offered by Google included a contest T-shirt and a participation certificate for completing at least one task and US$100 for every three tasks completed to a maximum of US$500. There was a grand prize of a trip to the Google headquarters for an award ceremony. Each participating open source project selected one contestant to receive the grand prize, for a total of 10 grand prize winners.

== Statistics ==
Year	Number of organizations	Number of participants	Total tasks completed
2010	20	326	2,167
2011	18	542	3,054
2012	10	555	1,925
2013	10	337	2,113
2014	12	658	3,236
2015	14	980	4,776
2016	17	1,340	6,418
2017	25	3,555	16,468
2018	27	3,124	15,323
2019	29	3,566	20,840

== Eligibility ==
Students must be between 13 and 17 years old (inclusive) to participate. In addition, students must upload parental consent forms as well as some documentation proving enrollment in a pre-university program.

== Program ==
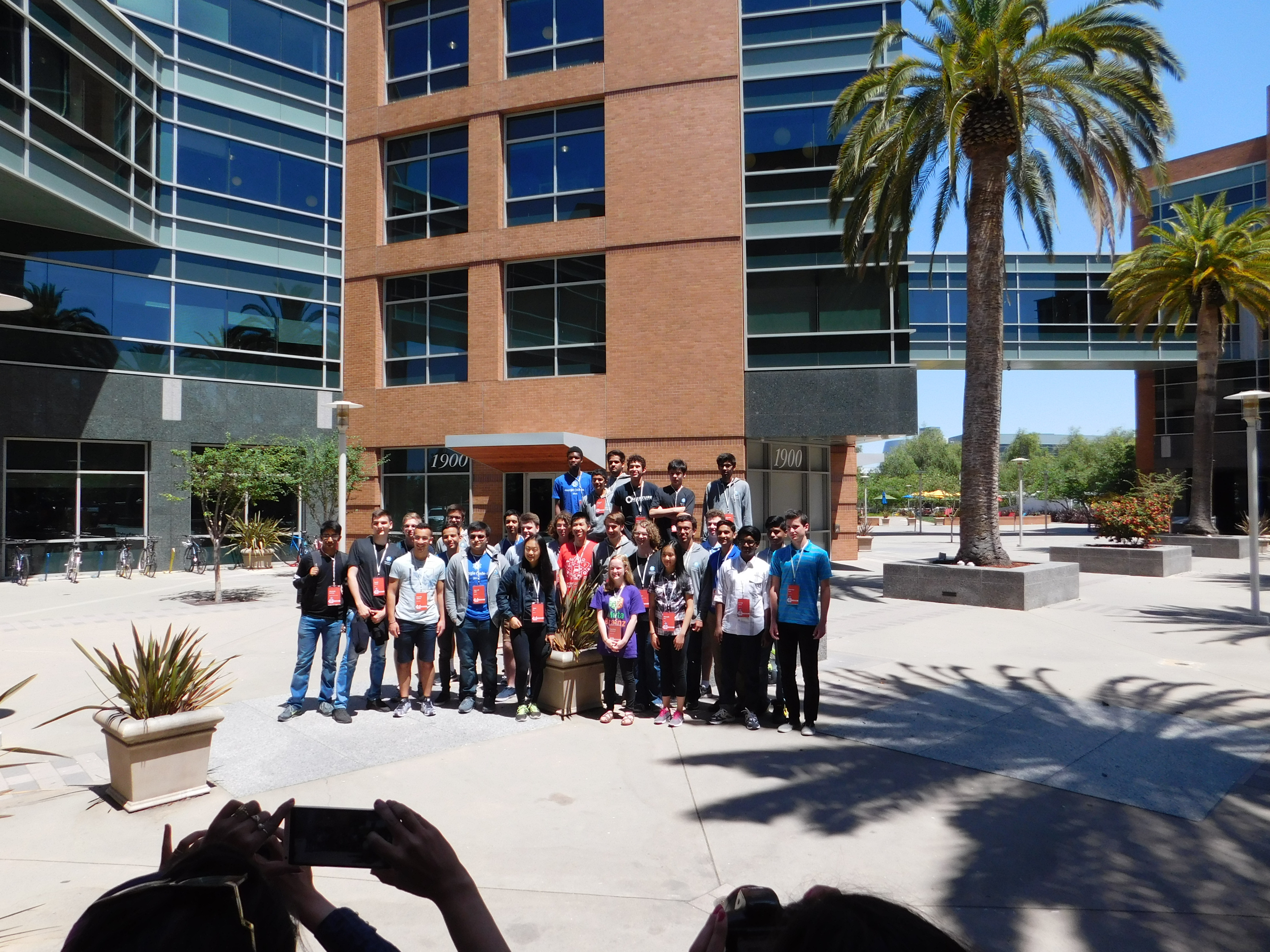
Google Code-in 2015 Grand Prize winners' trip

Google partners with certain open source organizations, all of which have had previous experience working with Google open source programs like Google Summer of Code. These organizations come up with "bite-sized" tasks that are self-contained, designed for pre-university students to complete. When the contest begins, students can register and claim tasks. Once claimed, students will have a set period of time to complete the task and can receive help from the mentor and the organization's community. Students may ask for deadline extensions if needed.

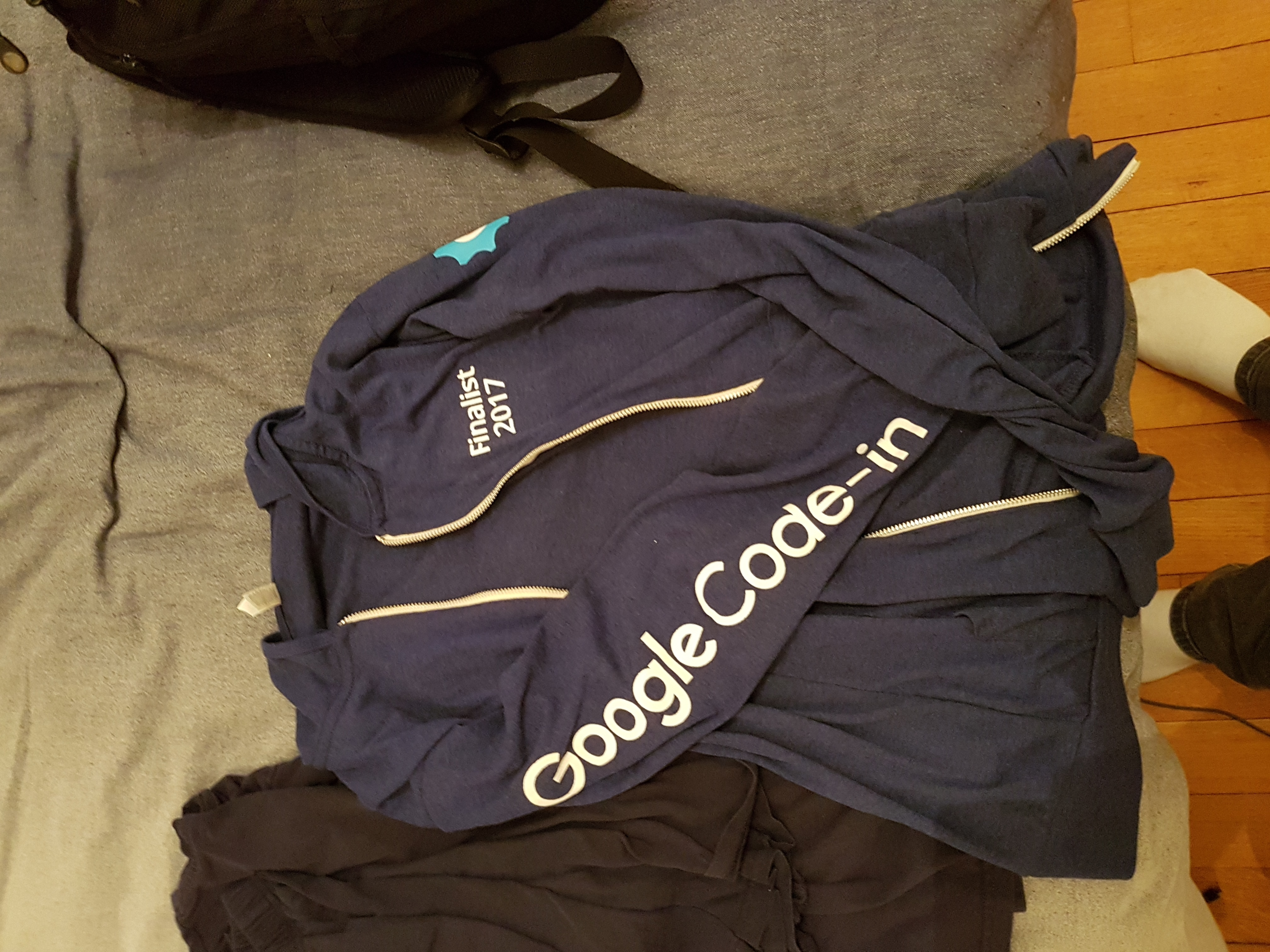
Finalist's prize - a hoodie

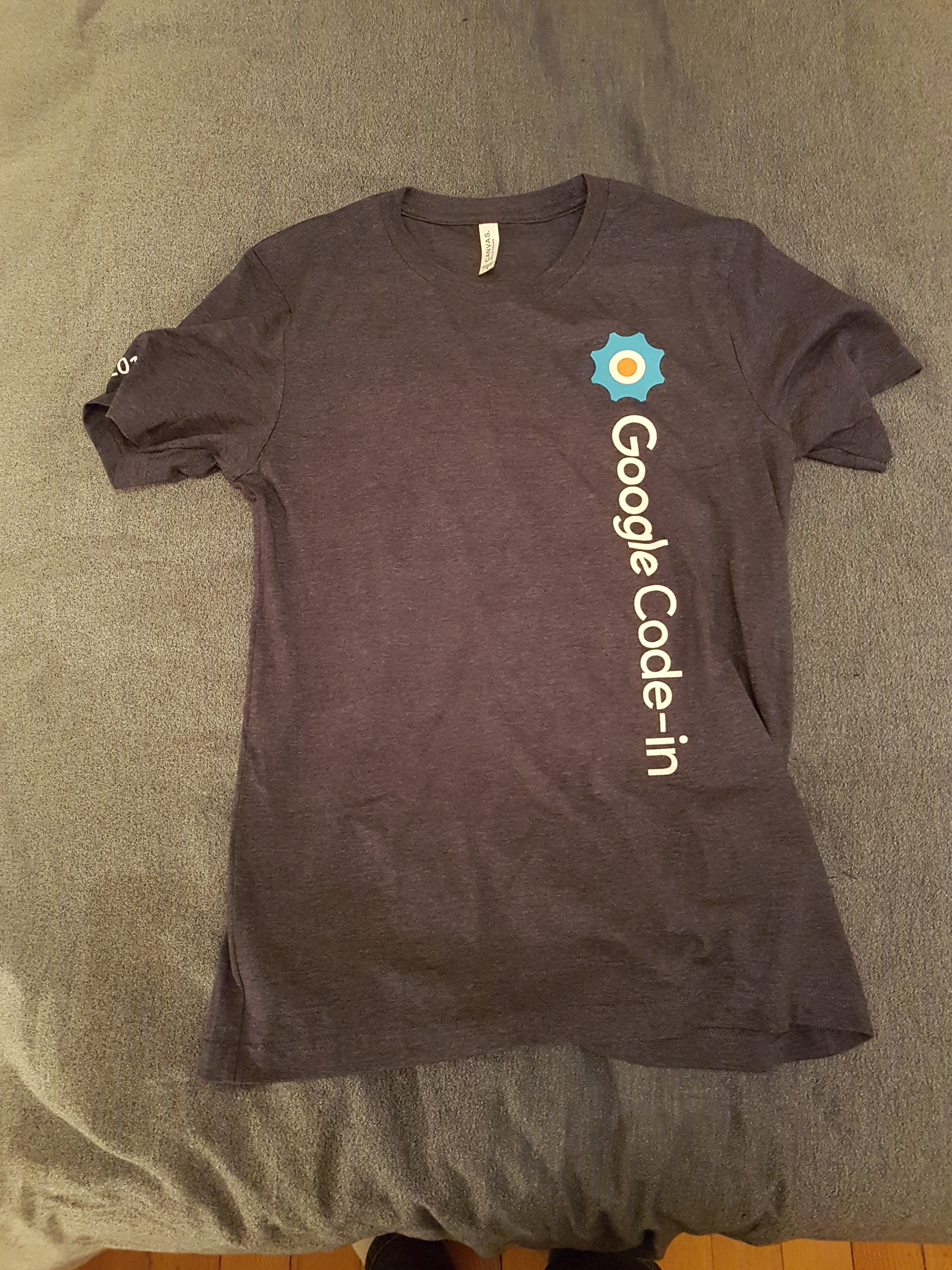
Google Code-in T-shirt 2017

== Prizes ==
Students who complete one task earn a certificate. Students who complete three tasks earn a T-shirt in addition to the certificate. There is a maximum of one T-shirt and one certificate per student. At the end of the competition, each organization will choose two students as the grand prize award winners and they will visit Google's Mountain View, California, USA headquarters for a four-day trip with an awards ceremony, an opportunity to meet with Google engineers, and a day of sightseeing in San Francisco.

== See also ==
- List of computer-related awards
