= Sarita Adve =

Computer scientist and professor

Sarita V. Adve
- Education: Indian Institute of Technology Bombay (B.Tech); University of Wisconsin-Madison (M.S., PhD)
- Scientific career
- Workplaces: University of Illinois at Urbana-Champaign; Rice University

Sarita Vikram Adve is the Richard T. Cheng Professor of Computer Science at the University of Illinois at Urbana-Champaign. Her research interests are in computer architecture and systems, parallel computing, and power and reliability-aware systems.

== Education and career ==
Adve completed a Bachelor of Technology degree in electrical engineering at Indian Institute of Technology Bombay in 1987. She subsequently completed a Master of Science (1989) and Ph.D. (1993) in computer science at the University of Wisconsin–Madison. Before joining Illinois, Adve was a member of faculty at Rice University from 1993 to 1999. She served on the NSF CISE directorate's advisory committee from 2003 to 2005 and on the expert group to revise the Java memory model from 2001 to 2005. She served as chair of ACM SIGARCH from 2015 to 2019.

She was elected as the Fellow of the Institute of Electrical and Electronics Engineers (IEEE) in 2012 for her contributions to shared memory semantics and parallel computing.

She was the PhD supervisor of Parthasarathy Ranganathan.

== Awards and honors ==
Adve received the Ken Kennedy Award in 2018, the ACM SIGARCH Maurice Wilkes award in 2008, an IBM faculty award in 2005, was named a UIUC University Scholar in 2004, received an Alfred P. Sloan Research Fellowship in 1998, an IBM University Partnership award in 1997 and 1998, and a National Science Foundation CAREER award in 1995. Adve was named a Fellow of the ACM in 2010. She was the winner of the 2012 ABIE Award for Innovation from the Anita Borg Institute.

In 2020, Adve was elected to the American Academy of Arts and Sciences. In 2023, Adve was elected as a Fellow of the American Association for the Advancement of Science.
