= Nam Sung Kim =

Nam Sung Kim (김남승; born c. 1974) is a full professor of electrical and computer engineering at the University of Illinois at Urbana–Champaign an IEEE and ACM Fellow. He was on leave for two years serving as a Corporate Senior Vice President at Samsung Electronics and leading the development of the first commercial memory product with near memory computing capability.

Kim received his B.S. (1997) and M.S. (2000) in electrical engineering from the Korea Advanced Institute of Science and Technology before moving to the United States for his Ph.D. at the University of Michigan. From 2004 to 2008 he was a senior research scientist at Intel. He joined in the faculty of the University of Wisconsin–Madison in 2008, and moved to the University of Illinois in 2015 and then moved again to Samsung as an engineer in the memory division in 2018. He was named Fellow of the Institute of Electrical and Electronics Engineers (IEEE) in 2016 "for contribution to circuits and architectures for power-efficient microprocessors".
