= Parthasarathy Ranganathan =

Computer scientist at Google

Parthasarathy Ranganathan is a computer scientist at Google designing next-generation systems.

== Education ==
Dr. Ranganathan received his B.Tech. degree from the Indian Institute of Technology, Madras and his M.S. and Ph.D. from Rice University. Sarita Adve was his PhD supervisor.

== Career ==
Prior to Google, Ranganathan worked at Hewlett Packard Labs in Palo Alto.

== Awards and honors ==
In 2011, he was elected an ACM Distinguished Member The following year, he was named an IEEE Fellow for contributions to energy-efficient datacenters.
