= Hamakor =

Israeli non-profit organization

Hamakor – Israeli Society for Free and Open Source Software
- המקור – עמותה ישראלית לתוכנה חופשית ולקוד־מקור פתוח
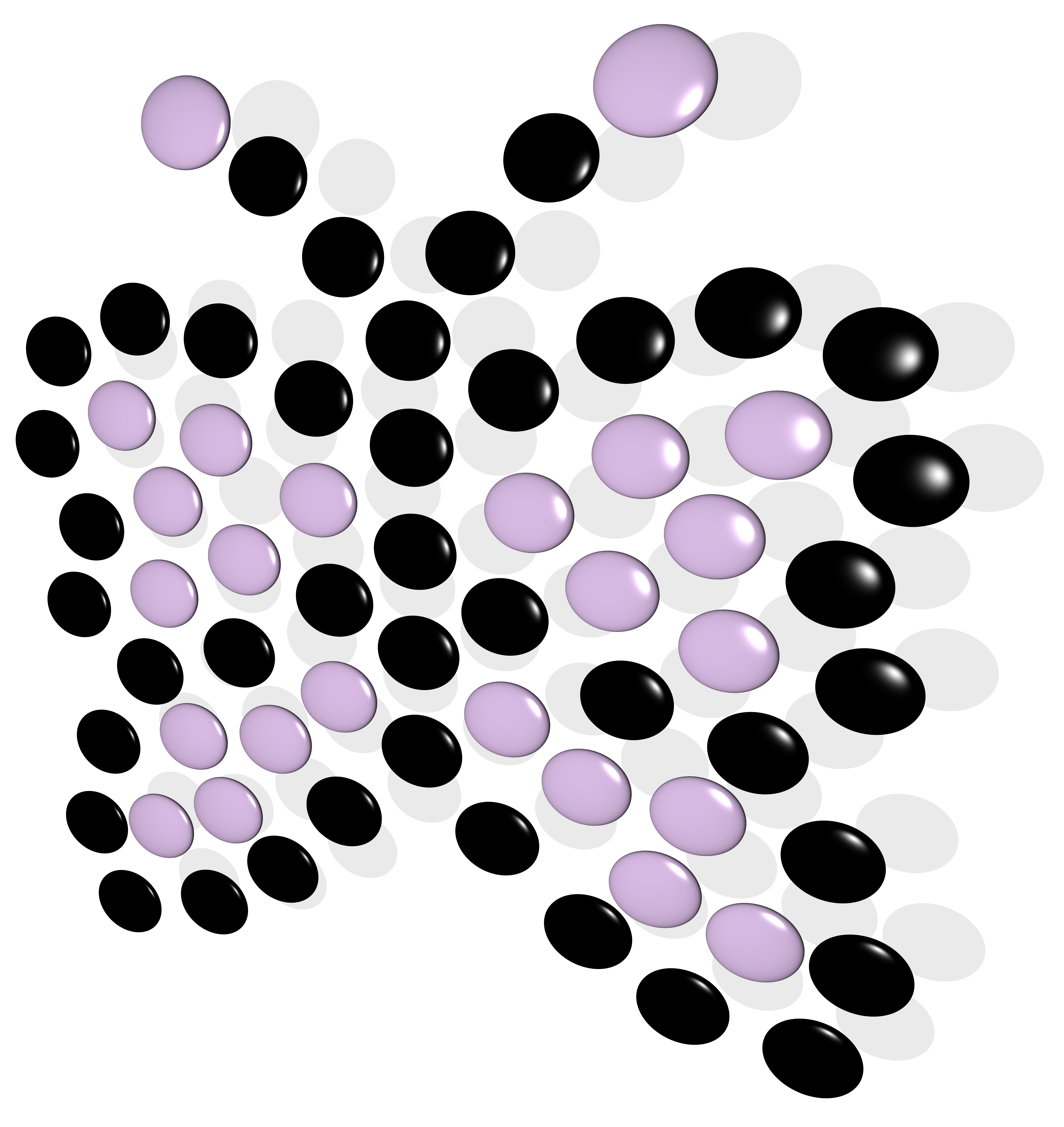
- Abbreviation: Hamakor
- Formation: January 2003; 23 years ago
- Location: Israel
- Official language: Hebrew
- Website: www.hamakor.org.il

Hamakor (Hebrew: המקור), officially known as Hamakor – Israeli Society for Free and Open Source Software (Hebrew: המקור – עמותה ישראלית לתוכנה חופשית ולקוד־מקור פתוח), is an Israeli non-profit organization dedicated to the advancement of free and open source software in Israel.

Hamakor was founded in January 2003.

== Background and formation ==
Several members of Israel's open-source community, most notably Gilad Ben-Yossef and Doron Ofek, pioneered the idea of forming an official, legally recognized organization. They wanted to counter difficulties with the non-open-source-related bodies and to address the inherently decentralized way open source is developed and advocated. Two main bodies expected to deal with organizations in that respect: the media, which is accustomed to having someone to call to get a comment, and the Knesset, where standing up in front of legislators requires answering the implicit question "who am I and why should you listen to me?". It was felt that, as individuals, the community's ability to make a difference suffered in comparison with an organized body.

The idea matured for some time. The final push to form the actual organization came from a desire by Gilad Ben-Yossef, circa July 2002, to see Revolution OS in Israel. It turned out that the only way to see the movie was to rent a cinema hall and to pay the distributor. Gilad decided to open the event to the public and to charge a small fee for entrance to cover costs. The event, labeled "August Penguin", took place on the first Friday of August, 2002. The event proved a financial success, in that an extra 2000 NIS were recorded after expenses. Gilad pledged to use that money to start the official organization. This also affected Hamakor's charter, adding to it the capacity to act as a recognized money-handler on behalf of the community for organizing events or any other monetary activity.

== Meaning of the name ==
The name for Hamakor was offered by Ira Abramov. It was offered after a series of Linux related names was offered, as a name that is not specifically related to Linux (as opposed to free software at large) on one hand, and yet does have a Linux specific reference hidden in it. The word "Makor" in Hebrew means "source" (as in open source), but also "beak", being a hidden reference to Tux being a bird.

The original name as submitted to the registrar of non-profits was "Hamakor – The Israeli Society for Free and Open Source Software". The registrar struck down "the", claiming Hamakor has no right to claim exclusivity.

== Two levels of membership ==
Most of the points in Hamakor's charter were either fairly straightforward, based on the reasons for forming it, or a result of legal requirements. One point that was largely debated, however, was whether anyone could become a full voting member. Hamakor aimed to represent the community. The concern raised was that the commercial companies would try to take control over the organization. As a result, two restrictions were imposed. The first was that membership was limited to individuals only. The second was the creation of a two-level membership structure. Hamakor has members, who have full voting rights, and friends. A friend is an individual who enjoys all the benefits (such as they are) of a member, except for one—friends cannot vote on charter changes or when electing the board.

To move from friend status to full member status, one has to demonstrate some activity promoting free/open source software. The definition of "some" has changed over time. During some periods, the board required writing non-trivial amounts of code, while at other times, the board deemed helping a friend install Linux on their computer sufficient.

In most cases, almost anyone who wished to become a full member could do so.

== August Penguin ==
Having a gathering on the first Friday of August has become a tradition, and August Penguin has turned into the yearly conference for Hamakor. Due to the way the organization was formed, there is one more August Penguin conference than years Hamakor exists, having the situation where an organization's yearly conference actually pre-dates the organization's forming.

In 2005, the conference made an attempt to make the conference more aimed at the professional audience. As part of it, it was moved to Thursday (Friday is part of the weekend in Israel). In 2006, the conference was moved back to Friday, but due to scheduling problems happened on the second Friday of August. The conference is no longer about watching a movie, and has lectures from various sources. The conference also accepts sponsors, with the Israeli Internet Association being the most consistent one over the years.

== Meeting the objectives ==
It can be claimed the Hamakor managed to meet the original objectives behind its forming. Journalists do contact, either Hamakor directly or known people within the open source community for comments about events. Hamakor was active in blocking several DMCA like law proposals in Israel, and even managed to affect (alongside the Israeli chapter of the Internet Society) the renewed Copyright law in Israel, both in blocking anti-circumvention text from entering it and in keeping pro-customer text in it, and even managed to enhance the explicit reverse engineering allowance in the law to cover security audits as a legitimate reason to reverse engineer. Alongside August Penguin, it can be claimed that all of the original goals set for the society were met.

Since Hamakor operates with a balanced budget, and since the above activity is reactive in nature, some feel that Hamakor should take it on itself to do more. To date, Hamakor has not managed to overcome the gap between the centralized way a legal entity must act and the decentralized way a community acts. Hamakor's action are based solely on volunteers, and as such, is time constrained. Hamakor was involved in several initiatives that were attempted, but either never managed to make a real difference, or otherwise are taking years to show actual results. One such initiative was forming Linux based classrooms in schools – several schools came along, Hamakor managed to get equipment donated (or, in some cases, bought it), but lack of local volunteers made the project grind to halt almost completely.

Another aspect of this contradiction is the fact that while a lot of free software activity takes place in Israel, it is not directly Hamakor's doing. This is not a problem if Hamakor is limited to its original objectives, but when these objectives are expanded, resource limitation becomes a visible problem.

== Activities ==
Hamakor's primary activities include organization of the yearly August Penguin convention and support for the Israeli "Welcome to Linux" tradition of a yearly series of presentations and Linux Installfests that introduce Linux to beginners. The latter was started by the Haifa Linux Club but is now also conducted by the Tel Aviv Linux Club and the Jerusalem Linux Club.

== Hamakor prize ==
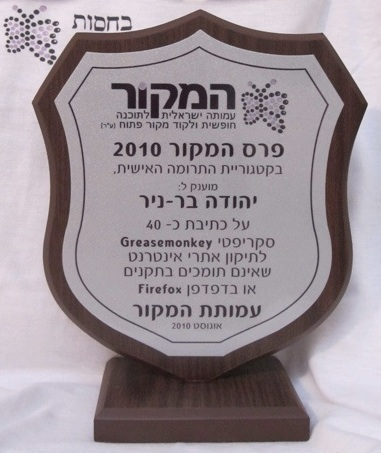
Hamakor's prize 2010 in the personal contribution category

Hamakor awards a prize annually, recognizing an Israeli who has made a significant and important contribution to Free Software. The awardee is determined in an Academy Award-like process, with all Hamakor members and friends being eligible to vote for the most deserving person, who is typically announced at the annual August Penguin event. In 2010, the prize was given in several categories: personal contribution, team/group or institute contribution and contribution for the Education system.

Year	Winner	Activity
2004	Maxim Iorsh	Culmus project providing high-quality Hebrew fonts
2005	Yael Vaya Talmor	Creating Free-software-based computer rooms in schools
2006	no prize awarded	
2007	no prize awarded	
2008	Meir Kriheli	Creating and running whatsup
2009	Gábor Szabó; Shachar Shemesh; Tomer Cohen; The education department of Petah Tikva	Organizing some Perl conferences and meetings in Israel; Contribution to the Israeli community; Localization of Firefox; Adopting Open source for the city's education system.
2010	Yehuda Bar-Nir; Blogli's website team; The Department of Software Engineering, Shenkar College of Engineering and Design	Writing 40 Greasemonkey scripts for fixing websites and their support for Firefox; Building a free (as in gratis) blogging website based on WordPress MU and encouraging the use of free software for a blogging platform.; Hebrew translation and support for Moodle
2011	Nadav Har'El	Participating in the development of Hspell, the free software Hebrew spell checker

== Elected board members ==
Hamakor's board consists of three elected members. The following people have served on Hamakor's board: (the year listed is the year of election)

- Gilad Ben-Yossef (2003, 2005)
- Shachar Shemesh (2003, 2006, 2007)
- Doron Ofek (2003, 2009)
- Muli Ben-Yehuda (2003)
- Nadav Har'El (2004)
- Alon Altman (2004, 2005)
- Ori Idan (2004)
- Orna Agmon (2005)
- Dotan Mazor (2006)
- Nadav Vinik (2006, 2007, 2008)
- Ram-On Agmon (2007, 2008, 2009, 2011)
- Eyal Levin (2008, 2009, 2011)
- Lior Kaplan (2009, 2011)
- Adir Abraham (2011)
- Shai Berger (2016, 2017, 2018, 2019, 2020)
- Tomer Brisker (2017, 2018, 2019, 2020)
- Amit Aronovitch (2018, 2019, 2020)
- Inbal Levi (2021, 2022, 2023, 2024)
- Shani Levim (2021, 2022, 2023, 2024)
- Aviv Sela (2021, 2022, 2023, 2024)
- Moshe Nahmias (2021, 2022, 2023, 2024)
- Idan Miara (2021, 2022, 2023, 2024)
- Guy Sheffer (2024)
