= David Theodore Blaauw =

American academic

David Theodore Blaauw is a professor in the Electrical and Computer Engineering program at the University of Michigan, Ann Arbor, MI was named Fellow of the Institute of Electrical and Electronics Engineers (IEEE) in 2012 for contributions to adaptive and low power circuit design.

== Education ==
- B.S. from Duke University, 1986
- Ph.D. from the University of Illinois, Urbana
