= ACM SIGARCH =

ACM's Special Interest Group on computer architecture

Association for Computing Machinery Special Interest Group on Computer Architecture (ACM SIGARCH)
- Founded: August 1971; 55 years ago
- Purpose: Computer architecture
- Region served: International
- Website: www.sigarch.org
- Formerly called: SICARCH

ACM SIGARCH is the Association for Computing Machinery's Special Interest Group on computer architecture, a community of computer professionals and students from academia and industry involved in research and professional practice related to computer architecture and design. The organization sponsors many prestigious international conferences in this area, including the International Symposium on Computer Architecture (ISCA), recognized as the top conference in this area since 1975. Together with IEEE Computer Society's Technical Committee on Computer Architecture (TCCA), it is one of the two main professional organizations for people working in computer architecture.

ACM SIGARCH was formed in August 1971, initially as a Special Interest Committee (a precursor to a SIG), with Michael J. Flynn as the founding chairman. Flynn was also the founding chairman of IEEE Computer Society's TCCA and encouraged from the beginning, joint cooperation between the two groups. Many of the joint symposiums and conferences are the leading events in the field.

== Journal ==
ACM SIGARCH Computer Architecture News is a newsletter, started in January 1972, that publishes refereed articles about computer hardware and its interactions with compilers and operating systems.

== Conferences ==
ACM SIGARCH sponsors many top international conferences related to computer architecture.

- ASPLOS: ACM International Conference on Architectural Support for Programming Languages and Operating Systems
- ANCS: ACM/IEEE Symposium on Architectures for Networking and Communications Systems
- CCGrid: ACM/IEEE International Symposium on Cluster, Cloud and Grid Computing
- HPDC: ACM International Symposium on High-Performance Parallel and Distributed Computing
- ICS: ACM International Conference on Supercomputing
- IPDPS: IEEE International Parallel and Distributed Processing Symposium
- ISCA: ACM/IEEE International Symposium on Computer Architecture
- NANOCOM: ACM International Conference on Nanoscale Computing and Communication
- NOCS: ACM/IEEE International Symposium on Networks-on-Chip
- PACT: ACM/IEEE International Conference on Parallel Architectures and Compilation
- SenSys: ACM Conference on Embedded Networked Sensor Systems
- SPAA: ACM Symposium on Parallelism in Algorithms and Architectures
- UCC: IEEE/ACM International Conference on Utility and Cloud Computing

== Awards ==
SIGARCH offers a variety of awards for outstanding contributions to computer architecture:

- Maurice Wilkes Award
- Eckert–Mauchly Award (with IEEE Computer Society)
- ISCA Influential Paper Award (with IEEE-CS TCCA)
- Alan D. Berenbaum Distinguished Service Award
- ASPLOS Influential Paper Award

== See also ==
- Computer engineering
- Computer science
- Computing
