= IEEE Computer Society =

Professional society of the IEEE

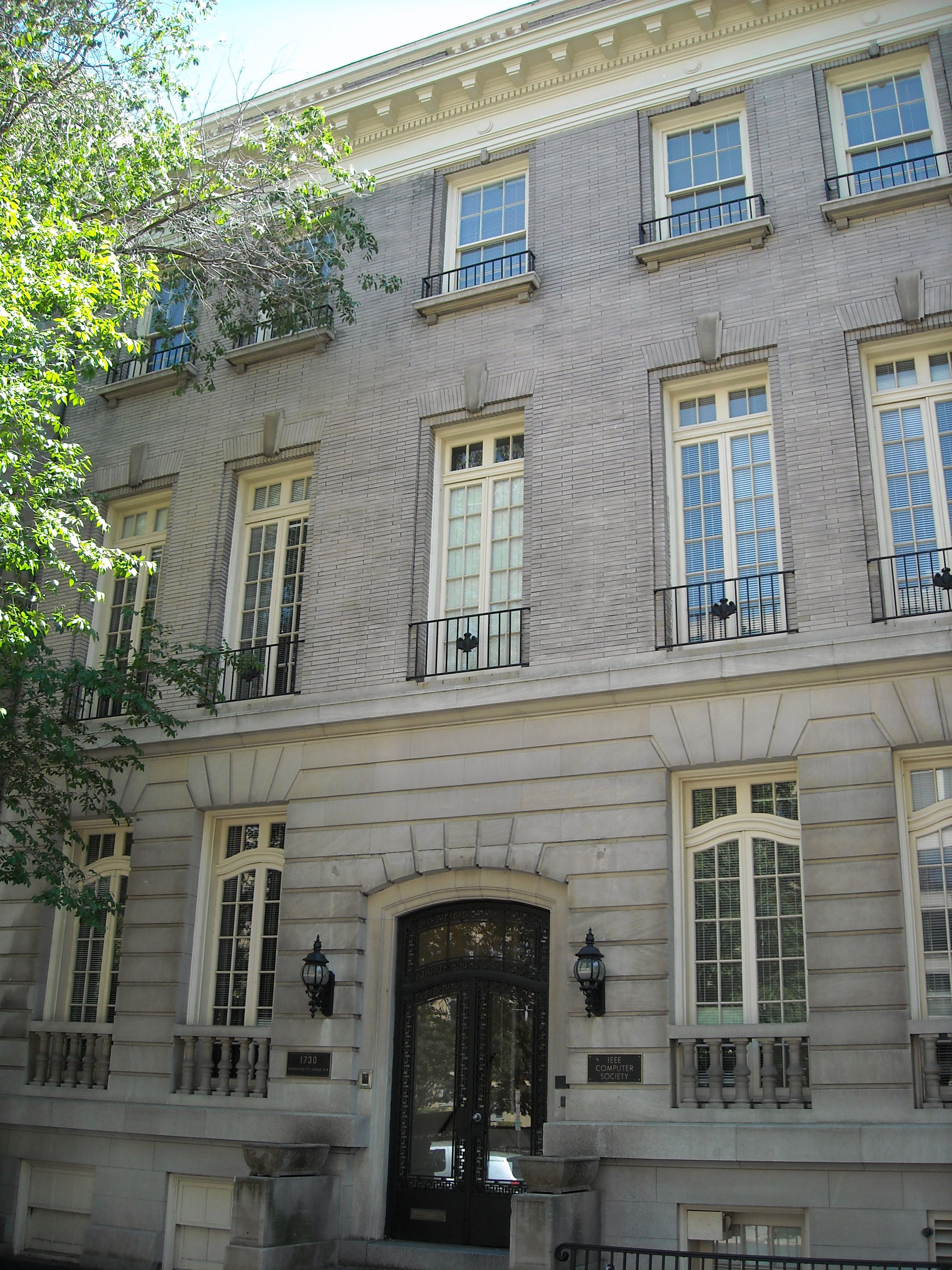
- Founded: 1946; 80 years ago
- Type: Professional organization
- Purpose: Computer and information processing science and technology
- Headquarters: Washington, DC, United States
- Origins: Formation of the American Institute of Electrical Engineers (AIEE) Subcommittee on Large-Scale Computing
- Region served: Worldwide
- Method: Publications, conferences, technical councils, industry standards, certification, and training
- Members: > 373,100
- Key people: Grace Lewis (2026 President). Anne Marie Kelly (interim Executive Director).
- Website: www.computer.org

IEEE Computer Society (commonly known as the Computer Society or CS) is a technical society of the Institute of Electrical and Electronics Engineers (IEEE) dedicated to computing, namely the major areas of hardware, software, standards and people, "advancing the theory, practice, and application of computer and information processing science and technology." It was founded in 1946 and is the largest of 39 technical societies organized under the IEEE Technical Activities Board with over 375,000 members in 150 countries, more than 100,000 being based in the United States alone.

It operates as a "global, non-governmental, not-for-profit professional society", publishing 23 peer-reviewed journals, facilitating numerous technical committees, and developing IEEE computing standards. It maintains its headquarters in Washington, DC and additional offices in California, China, and Japan.

== History ==
IEEE Computer Society headquarters Office in Washington, D.C.

The IEEE Computer Society traces its origins to the Subcommittee on Large-Scale Computing, established in 1946 by the American Institute of Electrical Engineers (AIEE), and to the Professional Group on Electronic Computers (PGEC), established in 1951 by the Institute of Radio Engineers (IRE). When the AIEE merged with the IRE in 1963 to form the Institute of Electrical and Electronics Engineers (IEEE), these two committees became the IEEE Computer Group. The group established its own constitution and bylaws in 1971 to become the IEEE Computer Society.

== Main activities ==
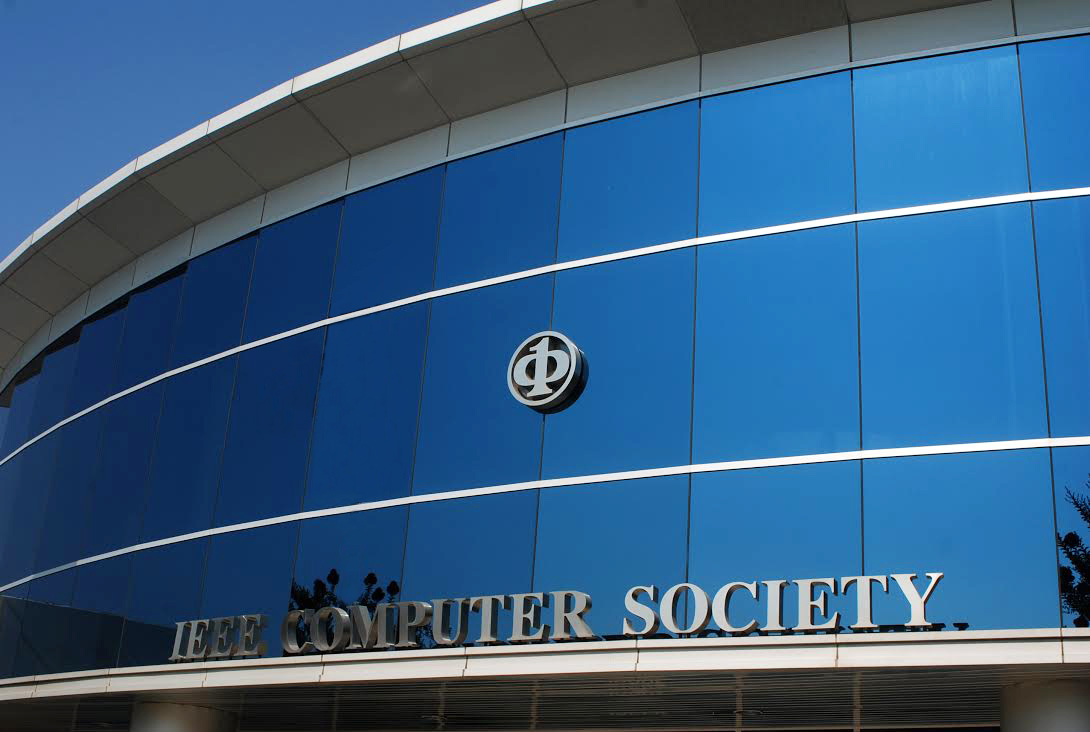
IEEE Computer Society publications office in Los Alamitos, California

The IEEE Computer Society maintains volunteer boards in five program areas: membership, professional and educational activities, publications, standards, and technical and conference activities, and hosts over 195 conferences worldwide. In addition, 12 standing boards and committees administer activities such as the CS elections and its awards programs to recognize professional excellence.

=== Education and professional development ===
The IEEE Computer Society participates in ongoing development of college computing curricula, jointly with the Association for Computing Machinery (ACM). Other educational activities include software development certification programs and online access to e-learning courseware and books.

=== Publications ===
The IEEE Computer Society is a leading publisher of technical material in computing. Its publications include 12 peer-reviewed technical magazines and 25 scholarly journals called Transactions, as well as conference proceedings, books, and a variety of digital products.

The Computer Society Digital Library (CSDL) is the primary repository of the Computer Society's digital assets and provides subscriber access to all CS publications, as well as conference proceedings and other papers, amounting to more than 810,000 pieces of content.

In 2014, the IEEE Computer Society launched the complementary monthly digest Computing Edge magazine, which consists of curated articles from its magazines.

=== Technical conferences and activities ===
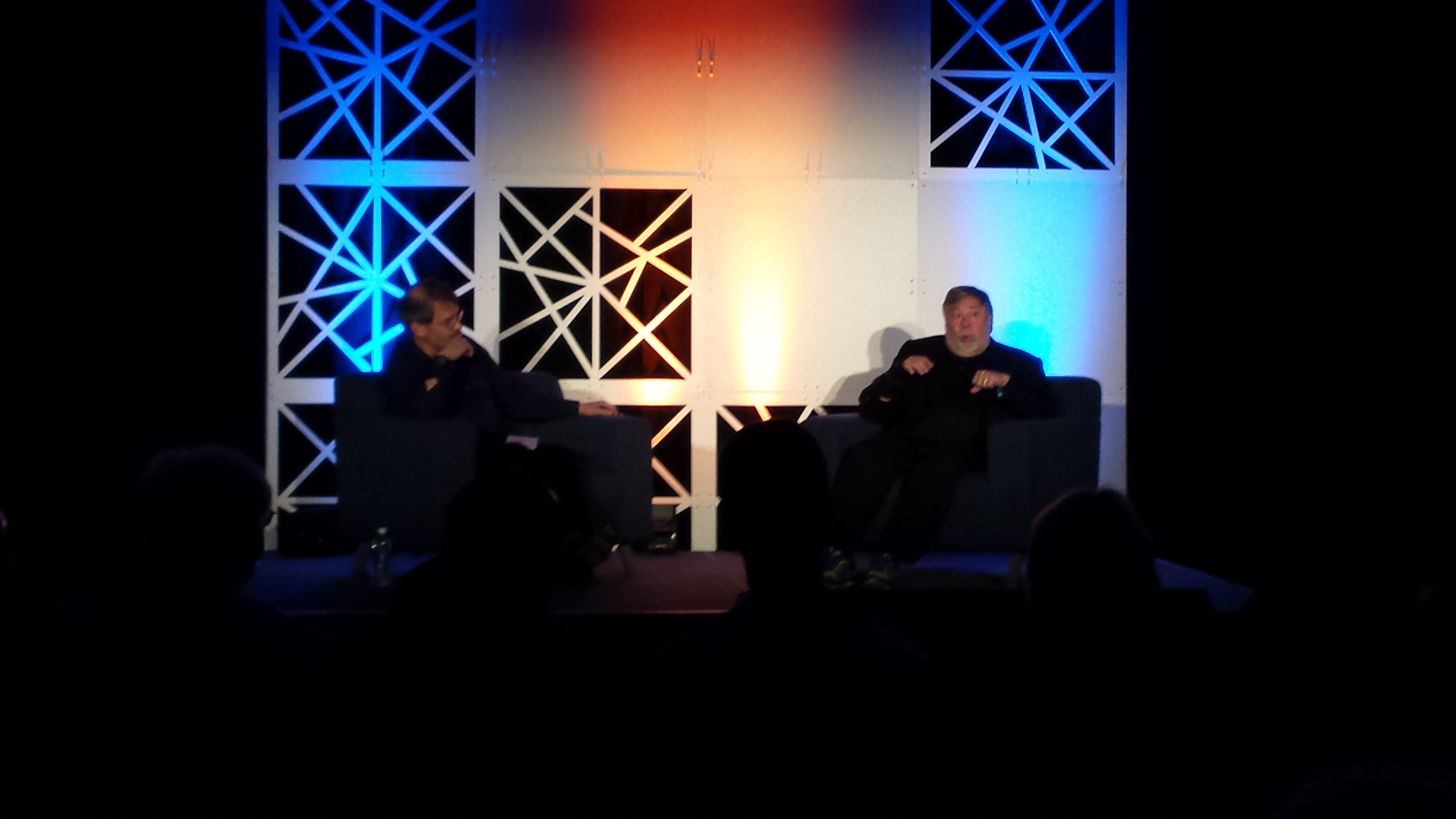
Steve Wozniak (age 66) relating tales of his television jammer hijinks from college at the first TechIgnite conference (2017)

The IEEE Computer Society sponsors around 200 technical conferences each year. Its Member and Geographic Activities (MGA) Board supports and coordinates 634 IEEE Computer Society chapters around the world and offers programs like the Distinguished Visitor Program (DVP).

The IEEE Computer Society maintains 12 standards committees to develop IEEE standards in various areas of computer and software engineering (e.g., the Design Automation Standards Committee and the IEEE 802 LAN/MAN Standards Committee).

=== Technical Communities ===
The IEEE Computer Society currently has 29 active technical communities and task forces. A technical community (TC) is an international network of professionals with common interests in computer hardware, software, its applications, and interdisciplinary fields within the umbrella of the IEEE Computer Society serving as the focal point of the various technical activities within a technical discipline which influences the standards development, conferences, publications, and educational activities of the IEEE Computer Society.

==== Very Large Scale Integration (TCVLSI) ====
Technical Community on VLSI (TCVLSI) is a technical community that oversees various technical activities related to computer hardware, integrated circuit design, and software for computer hardware design covering the computer-aided design (CAD) or electronic design automation (EDA) techniques to facilitate the very-large-scale integration (VLSI) design process. The VLSI may include various types of circuits and systems, such as digital circuits and systems, analog circuits, as well as mixed-signal circuits and systems. The emphasis of TCVLSI widely covers the integrating the design, CAD, fabrication, application, and business aspects of VLSI, encompassing both hardware and software. The Chair of the TCVLSI is elected by the voting members of TCVLSI. Other executive members of TCVLSI are appointed by the Chair.

== Awards ==
The IEEE Computer Society recognizes outstanding work by computer professionals who advance the field in three areas of achievement: Technical Awards (e.g., the IEEE Computer Society Computer Pioneer in Honor of the Women of ENIAC Award, Harry H. Goode Memorial Award or the W. Wallace McDowell Award), Education Awards (e.g., Taylor L. Booth Education Award), and Service Awards (e.g., Richard E. Merwin Award for Distinguished Service).

In 2018, the organization won First Place in the Los Angeles Press Club's annual Southern California Journalism Awards for "Untold Stories: Setting the Record Straight on Tech's Racial History", in the minority/immigration reporting online category.

== See also ==
- Association for Computing Machinery
- Association of Information Technology Professionals
- Australian Computer Society
- British Computer Society
- Canadian Information Processing Society
- China Computer Federation
- IEEE Technical Activities Board
- Institute of Electrical and Electronics Engineers
- Institution of Analysts and Programmers
- ISCA Influential Paper Award
- New Zealand Computer Society
