= Xeropan =

Language learning application

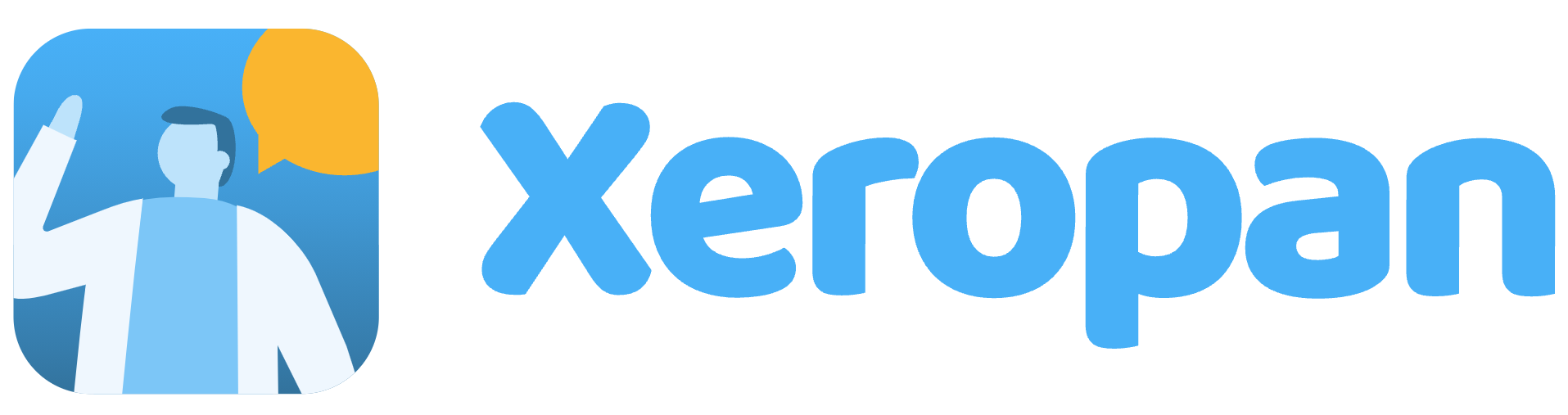

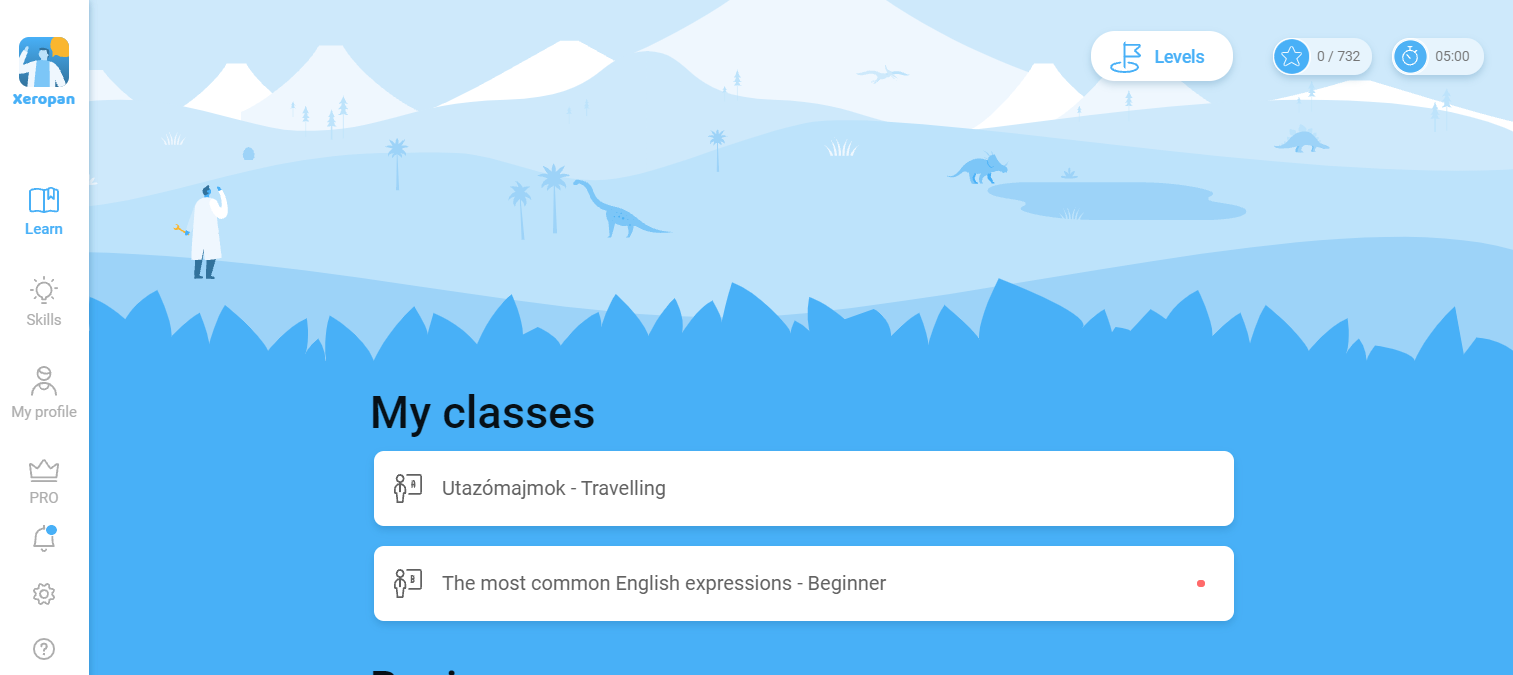
- Xeropan web screenshot
- Available in: Source languages: Hungarian, English, German, Spanish, French, Italian, Korean, Japanese, Indonesian, Hindi, Portuguese, Arabic, Turkish, Russian, Vietnamese, Polish and Romanian Teaches: US English
- Country of origin: Hungary
- Area served: Worldwide
- Founders: Attila AlGharawi and Ferenc Mile
- Industry: Online education
- Services: Language courses from A1 to C1, Xeropan Classroom
- Employees: 45+
- Website: www.xeropan.com
- Registration: Free
- Users: 1.5 million +
- Launched: September 2013
- Current status: Online
- Native clients on: iOS, Android, Web Browser

Xeropan ( |ˈzɪropæn \ zee-row-paan) is a gamified language learning application built by English-language teachers.

== History ==
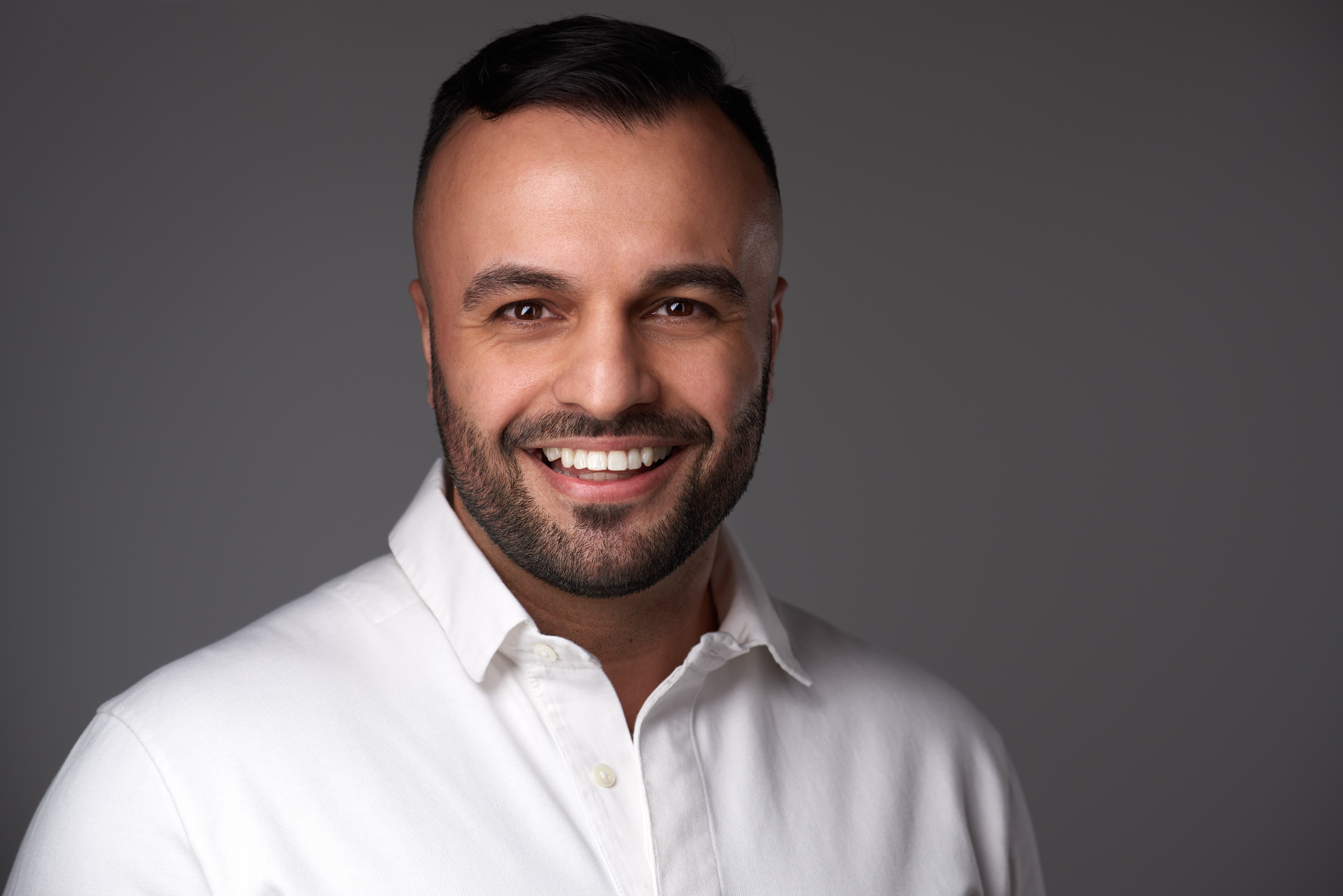
Attila AlGharawi

Xeropan was founded in September 2013 by Attila AlGharawi and Ferenc Mile. Attila is a language teacher and Ferenc was one of his students. The main idea behind the application was to develop an innovative, up-to-date, easily accessible platform for language learners. Since the launch, more than 1.5 million people have downloaded the application from over 160 countries all over the world.

In 2015, Xeropan won the best app in the lifestyle category in the Appra magyar! contest.

In 2018, the company raised almost EUR 800,000 from state-owned venture capital investment fund Hiventures.

In 2019, Xeropan 3.0 was released with a new design and the AI-based chatbot and speakbot functions. With the help of these features, learners are able to practice real-life conversations using the app.

In 2020, Xeropan won the award for world’s best “Learning Relationship Management,” or interactive learning support system, from EdTech Breakthrough, one of the most renowned educational review organizations in the world.

In September 2020, Xeropan launched Xeropan Classroom. This application allows teachers to assign lessons from the selection within the Xeropan app. Xeropan Classroom enables teachers to monitor their students’ learning process and provides them with tips and teaching material as well.

In 2020, Xeropan was chosen by Google as one of the 9 best startup applications within the framework of the Google Accelerator program.

In 2021, Xeropan again won the award for world’s best “Learning Relationship Management,” or interactive learning support system, from EdTech Breakthrough.

As of 2021, Xeropan is available in 17 different languages and teaches US English. Source languages include Hungarian, English, German, Spanish, French, Italian, Korean, Japanese, Indonesian, Hindi, Portuguese, Arabic, Turkish, Russian, Vietnamese, Polish and Romanian.

The company has announced that soon German, French and Spanish languages will be available to learn on the platform.

As of September 2021, Xeropan has 45 employees.

In November 2021, Xeropan's German Lessons was released, with which students can learn German language from A1 to B2 level.

In July 2022, Xeropan released the Spanish and the French Lessons.

== Overview ==
Xeropan’s unique features are the AI-powered chatbot and speakbot functions with which learners can practice speaking and pronunciation. The application teaches languages by dividing them into the 4 main skills: speaking, writing, reading and listening. The application is available on the web, Android and iOS. Xeropan offers its English course based on CEFR levels A1 to C1.

The learning material is divided into 4 parts, all of which revolve around a topic of conversation and a real life video. Learners first learn the key vocabulary elements of a video. Once they complete interactive vocabulary quizzes, they are presented with a video and grammar practice. Finally, learners can practice their conversational skills with the Xeropan bots.

== Features ==
=== Xeropan bots ===
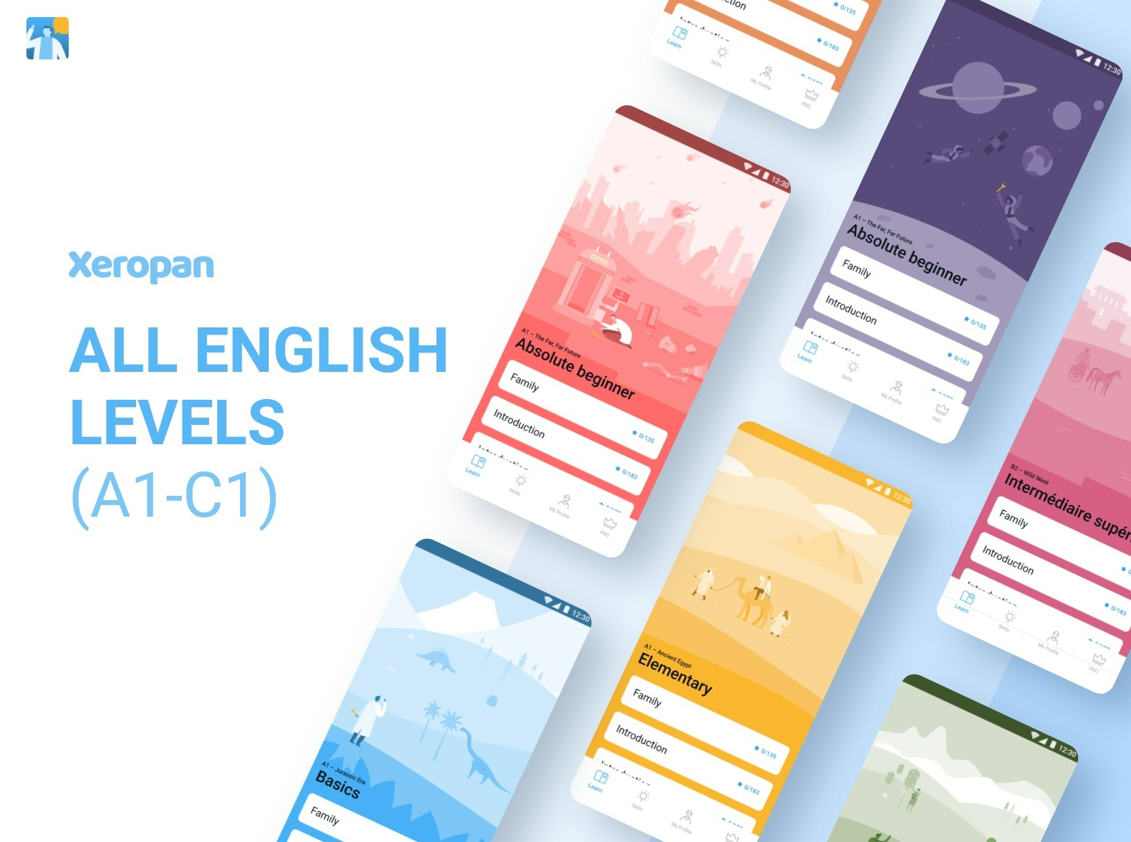
Xeropan app

AI based characters motivate, correct, and help learners to learn via real-life situations. The speakbots resemble native language teachers.

=== Xeropan videos ===
Xeropan offers 800 video-based interactive lessons from A1 to C1 level. The videos reflect everyday situations and draw from pop-culture figures for a more immersive experience.

=== Xeropan vocabulary ===
Xeropan offers 8000 most widely used expressions to learn in 24 categories. Xeropan keeps track of weak and strong vocabulary elements and learners can only practice those expressions that require more training. Using spaced repetition newly introduced and more difficult expressions are shown more frequently while older and less difficult ones are shown less frequently in order to exploit the psychological spacing effect.

=== Xeropan grammar practice ===
Xeropan offers a digital grammar book, a comprehensive guide meant to help learners understand the language’s grammar.

=== Weekly lessons ===
A collection of weekly lessons is available to access for PRO learners with more than 700 of previously published weekly lessons. Xeropan wraps learning in a story where the learner is the hero.

=== Leaderboards ===
Xeropan offers a leaderboard based on a weekly ranking of the experience points learners have acquired in the lessons. Learners can also earn badges to further motivate themselves.

=== Xeropan Classroom for schools ===
Teachers can browse through 8 years’ worth of teaching materials, exercises and video lessons on different levels and topics. They can assign tasks and track and control their students’ progress.
