= Eckert–Mauchly Award =

Computer science award

The Eckert–Mauchly Award recognizes contributions to digital systems and computer architecture. It is known as the computer architecture community’s most prestigious award. First awarded in 1979, it was named for John Presper Eckert and John William Mauchly, who between 1943 and 1946 collaborated on the design and construction of the first large scale electronic computing machine, known as ENIAC, the Electronic Numerical Integrator and Computer. A certificate and $5,000 are awarded jointly by the Association for Computing Machinery (ACM) and the IEEE Computer Society for outstanding contributions to the field of computer and digital systems architecture.

== Recipients ==
- 1979 Robert S. Barton
- 1980 Maurice V. Wilkes
- 1981 Wesley A. Clark
- 1982 Gordon C. Bell
- 1983 Tom Kilburn
- 1984 Jack B. Dennis
- 1985 John Cocke
- 1986 Harvey G. Cragon
- 1987 Gene M. Amdahl
- 1988 Daniel P. Siewiorek
- 1989 Seymour Cray
- 1990 Kenneth E. Batcher
- 1991 Burton J. Smith
- 1992 Michael J. Flynn
- 1993 David J. Kuck
- 1994 James E. Thornton
- 1995 John Crawford
- 1996 Yale Patt
- 1997 Robert Tomasulo
- 1998 T. Watanabe
- 1999 James E. Smith
- 2000 Edward Davidson
- 2001 John Hennessy
- 2002 Bantwal Ramakrishna "Bob" Rau
- 2003 Joseph A. (Josh) Fisher
- 2004 Frederick P. Brooks
- 2005 Robert P. Colwell
- 2006 James H. Pomerene
- 2007 Mateo Valero
- 2008 David Patterson
- 2009 Joel Emer
- 2010 Bill Dally
- 2011 Gurindar S. Sohi
- 2012 Algirdas Avizienis
- 2013 James R. Goodman
- 2014 Trevor Mudge
- 2015 Norman Jouppi
- 2016 Uri Weiser
- 2017 Charles P. Thacker
- 2018 Susan J. Eggers
- 2019 Mark D. Hill
- 2020 Luiz André Barroso
- 2021 Margaret Martonosi
- 2022 Mark Alan Horowitz
- 2023 Kunle Olukotun
- 2024 Wen-Mei Hwu
- 2025 André Seznec
- 2026 Srinivas Devadas

== See also ==
- ACM Special Interest Group on Computer Architecture
- Computer engineering
- Computer science
- Computing
- List of computer science awards
