= Laura Grigori =

French applied mathematician

- Born: Onești, Romania
- Citizenship: France, Romania
- Occupations: full professor (EPFL) and head of the laboratory (PSI)
- Known for: numerical linear algebra, communication-avoiding algorithms
- Awards: SIAM Fellow (2020); SIAM Activity Group on Super- computing Career Prize (2024)

Academic background
- Education: Université Henri Poincaré, Nancy, France (PhD. 2001)
- Thesis: Prédiction de structure et algorithmique parallèle pour la factorisation LU des matrices creuses (2001)
- Doctoral advisor: Michel Cosnard

Academic work
- Discipline: applied mathematician, computer scientist
- Institutions: École Polytechnique Fédérale de Lausanne (EPFL) and Paul Scherrer Institute (PSI)
- Website: https://people.epfl.ch/laura.grigori?lang=en

Laura Grigori is a French-Romanian applied mathematician and computer scientist known for her research on numerical linear algebra and communication-avoiding algorithms. She is full professor at the École Polytechnique Fédérale de Lausanne (Swiss Federal Technology Institute of Lausanne) where she holds the chair of high performance numerical algorithms and simulations. She is also the Head of the Laboratory for Simulation and Modelling at Paul Scherrer Institute, Switzerland.

== Education and career ==
Grigori earned her Ph.D. from Henri Poincaré University in 2001. Her dissertation, Prédiction de structure et algorithmique parallèle pour la factorisation LU des matrices creuses, concerned parallel algorithms for LU decomposition of sparse matrices, and was supervised by Michel Cosnard.

After postdoctoral research at the University of California, Berkeley and the Lawrence Berkeley National Laboratory, she joined INRIA (French Institute for Research in Computer Science and Automation) as a junior researcher (chargé de recherche) in 2004 and worked there for nearly 18 years, eventually reaching a senior researcher position (Director de Recherche 1ère classe) and acting as a head of the "Alpines" scientific computing project jointly affiliated with INRIA and the Laboratoire Jacques-Louis Lions of Sorbonne University.

== Recognition ==
In 2012 together with Demmel, Hoemmen, and Langou, Grigori co-authored a paper on communication-avoiding algorithms for parallel matrix decomposition which won the 2016 Society for Industrial and Applied Mathematics (SIAM) Activity Group on Supercomputing Best Paper Prize for the best paper on parallel scientific and engineering computing from the previous four years.

In 2019, together with Cancès, Maday, and Piquemal, she was awarded an European Research Council (ERC) Synergy grant, “Extreme-scale Mathematically-based Computational Chemistry”.

In 2020 Grigori was named a SIAM Fellow "for contributions to numerical linear algebra, including communication-avoiding algorithms".

In 2024 she received the SIAM Activity Group on Supercomputing Career Prize “in acknowledgement of her outstanding contributions to scientific computing, particularly communication-avoiding algorithms”.

In 2026 she was selected as one of the 35 HPC Legends Class of 2026 by the HPC Wire journal.

She was the chair of the SIAM SIAG on Supercomputing (2016-17), a member of the SIAM Council, (2018-23), and a member of the SIAM Fellows Selection Committee (2021-23).

She was a vice chair and the chair of the PRACE (Partnership for Advanced Computing in Europe) Scientific Steering Committee, (2020-21 and 2021-22, respectively).

Grigori has been an invited plenary speaker at many international conferences on scientific computing including, SIAM Conference on Parallel Processing, IEEE/ACM Supercomputing Conference, SIAM Conference on Applied Linear Algebra, SIAM Conference on Computational Science and Engineering, Annual GAMM meeting.

== Selected papers ==
- "Randomized Gram--Schmidt process with application to GMRES", O Balabanov, L Grigori, SIAM Journal on Scientific Computing 44 (3), A1450-A1474, (2022)
- "Communication avoiding rank revealing QR factorization with column pivoting", JW Demmel, L Grigori, M Gu, H Xiang, SIAM Journal on Matrix Analysis and Applications 36 (1), 55-89, (2015)
- "Communication-optimal parallel and sequential QR and LU factorizations", J Demmel, L Grigori, M Hoemmen, J Langou, SIAM Journal on Scientific Computing 34 (1), 206-239, (2012)
- " CALU: a communication optimal LU factorization algorithm", L Grigori, JW Demmel, H Xiang, SIAM Journal on Matrix Analysis and Applications 32 (4), 1317-1350, (2011)
- "Communication avoiding Gaussian elimination", L Grigori, JW Demmel, H Xiang, SC'08: Proceedings of the 2008 ACM/IEEE Conference on Supercomputing, 1-12, (2008)
- "Parallel symbolic factorization for sparse LU with static pivoting", L Grigori, JW Demmel, XS Li, SIAM Journal on Scientific Computing 29 (3), 1289-1314, (2007)
