= MPKI =

MPKI may refer to:

- Managed Public Key Infrastructure, a computer security technology offered as service
- Missed Predictions per 1000 (=Kilo) Instructions, a characteristic variable in computer architecture to measure the quality of branch prediction
