= Richard Mattson =

American computer scientist (born 1935)

Richard Lewis Mattson (born May 29, 1935) is an American computer scientist known for his pioneering work on using memory trace data to simulate the performance of the memory hierarchy. He developed the stack distance profile, and used it to model page misses in virtual memory systems as a function of the amount of real memory available. The same methods have been applied as well more recently for modeling the behavior of CPU caches at lower levels of the memory hierarchy, and of web caches for internet content.

Mattson was born in Greeley, Colorado. He graduated from the University of California, Berkeley in 1957, with honors in electrical engineering. He became a student of Bernard Widrow at Stanford University, where he completed his doctorate in 1962. His dissertation was The Analysis and Synthesis of Adaptive Systems Which Use Networks of Threshold Elements. He then became a faculty member at Stanford himself, before moving to IBM Research in 1965. While at Stanford, he supervised two doctoral students, John Hopcroft and Yale Patt, both of whom themselves became notable computer scientists, and he has many academic descendants through both of them.
