= Harry H. Goode Memorial Award =

The Harry H. Goode Memorial Award is an IEEE Computer Society annual award in honor of Harry H. Goode for achievements in the information processing field which are considered either a single contribution of theory, design, or technique of outstanding significance, or the accumulation of important contributions on theory or practice over an extended time period, the total of which represent an outstanding contribution. It is one of the most prestigious technical awards given to individuals who have made significant contributions to the field of computing.

== Recipients ==
Recipients include:

- 1964 Howard Aiken
- 1965 George Stibitz and Konrad Zuse
- 1966 John Mauchly and J. Presper Eckert
- 1967 Samuel N. Alexander
- 1968 Maurice Vincent Wilkes
- 1974 Edsger W. Dijkstra
- 1975 Kenneth E. Iverson
- 1976 Lawrence G. Roberts
- 1979 Herman Goldstine
- 1981 C. A. R. Hoare
- 1983 Gene Amdahl
- 1985 Carver A. Mead
- 1992 Edward S. Davidson
- 1995 Michael J. Flynn
- 1996 Leonard Kleinrock
- 1997 James E. Thornton
- 1998 Vishwani Agrawal
- 1999 Ahmed Sameh
- 2000 John K. Iliffe
- 2001 Oscar H. Ibarra
- 2002 Ian F. Akyildiz
- 2003 Peter Chen
- 2004 Edmund M. Clarke
- 2005 John Hopcroft
- 2006 Alan Jay Smith
- 2007 Guy L. Steele Jr.
- 2008 Dharma Agrawal
- 2009 Mateo Valero
- 2010 (no award given)
- 2011 Moshe Y. Vardi
- 2012 Arvind
- 2013 Yale N. Patt
- 2014 Norman P. Jouppi
- 2015 David Padua
- 2016 Giovanni De Micheli
- 2017 K. Mani Chandy, Jayadev Misra
- 2018 Kunle Olukotun
- 2019 Marilyn C. Wolf
- 2020 Ian Foster, Carl Kesselman
- 2021 Josep Torrellas
- 2022 Subhasish Mitra
- 2023 J.J. Garcia-Luna-Aceves
- 2024 Willy Zwaenepoel
- 2025 Onur Mutlu

== See also ==
- Donald Davies – independently invented packet switching and modern data communication
- List of computer science awards
