= Alan D. Berenbaum Distinguished Service Award =

The Association for Computing Machinery SIGARCH Alan D. Berenbaum Distinguished Service Award is given for outstanding service in the field of computer architecture and design.

== Recipients ==
Source: ACM

- 2022 – David A. Wood
- 2022 – Kathryn S. McKinley
- 2021 – Per Stenström
- 2020 – Alvin R. Lebeck
- 2019 – Margaret Martonosi
- 2018 – Koen De Bosschere
- 2016 – Michael Flynn
- 2014 – Doug DeGroot
- 2013 – Norman P. Jouppi
- 2011 – David A. Patterson
- 2010 – Mary Jane Irwin
- 2009 – Mark D. Hill
- 2008 – Alan Berenbaum

== See also ==
- ACM Special Interest Group on Computer Architecture
- Computer engineering
- Computer science
- Computing
- Service
- List of computer-related awards
- List of computer science awards
