= Daniel Siewiorek =

American computer engineer

Daniel P. Siewiorek
- Education: University of Michigan, Ann Arbor (B.A., 1968); Stanford University (M.A., 1969; Ph.D., 1972)
- Known for: Electronic design automation, reliability computing, and context aware mobile computing, wearable computing, computer-aided design, rapid prototyping, fault tolerance
- Awards: AAEE Terman Award; IEEE/ACM Eckert–Mauchly Award; ACM SIGMOBILE Outstanding Contributions Award; IEEE Computer Society Taylor L. Booth Education Award
- Scientific career
- Fields: Computer science
- Institutions: Carnegie Mellon University
- Thesis: (1972)

Daniel P. Siewiorek is an American computer engineer and computer scientist, currently the Buhl University Professor Emeritus of Electrical and Computer Engineering and Computer Science at Carnegie Mellon University.

His research focuses on electronic design automation, reliability computing, and context aware mobile computing; he has also done research in wearable computing, computer-aided design, rapid prototyping, fault-tolerant computing, and computer architecture. At Carnegie Mellon University, he initiated and guided the Cm* project, which culminated in an operational 50-processor multiprocessor system. He has designed or been involved with the design of nine multiprocessor systems, and has also been a key contributor to the dependability design of over two dozen commercial computing systems. He currently leads an interdisciplinary team that has designed and constructed over 20 generations of mobile computing systems. He has written nine textbooks in addition to over 475 papers.

He is the former Director of Carnegie Mellon University's Quality of Life Technology NSF Engineering Research Center, Director of the Engineering Design Research Center, cofounder of its successor organization, the Institute for Complex Engineered Systems, and Department Head of the Human Computer Interaction Institute. He has also served as Chairman of the IEEE Technical Committee on Fault-Tolerant Computing, and founding Chairman of the IEEE Technical Committee on Wearable Information Systems.

He has been the recipient of the AAEE Terman Award, the IEEE/ACM Eckert–Mauchly Award, the ACM SIGMOBILE Outstanding Contributions Award. In February 2018, he was awarded the IEEE Computer Society Taylor L. Booth Education Award for "contributions to computer architecture, wearable computing, and human computer interaction education through his pioneering textbooks, mentoring, and leadership."

He is a Fellow of Institute of Electrical and Electronics Engineers (IEEE), Association for Computing Machinery (ACM), and American Association for the Advancement of Science (AAAS). He was also elected a member of the National Academy of Engineering in 2000 for contributions to wearable computers, multiprocessor design, reliable systems, and automated design synthesis.

== Education ==
Daniel P. Siewiorek received a Bachelor of Arts (B.A.) in Electrical Engineering from the University of Michigan, Ann Arbor in 1968. He then attended Stanford University, graduating with a Master of Arts (M.A.) in Electrical Engineering with a minor in Computer Science in 1969, and a Doctor of Philosophy (Ph.D.), also in Electrical Engineering, in 1972.
