= Branch queue =

In computer architecture, a branch queue is used to store the predictions made by the branch predictor. Each entry represents a single branch and stores a prediction about whether the branch is taken or not taken. Branch queues require cooperation between hardware and software components, and are used for efficient parallelization.

== See also ==
- Conditional (computer programming)
- Instruction pipelining
