= André Seznec =

French computer scientist

André Seznec is a French computer scientist. He is a senior research director at IRISA/INRIA in Rennes, France.

He was named a Fellow of the Institute of Electrical and Electronics Engineers (IEEE) in 2013 for contributions to design of branch predictors and cache memory for processor architectures. He was named a Fellow of the ACM in 2016. He is the 2020 B. Ramakrishna Rau Award recipient “for pioneering contributions to cache design and branch prediction". He received the 2025 Eckert–Mauchly Award for "pioneering contributions to branch prediction and cache memories".
