= Dharma Agrawal =

Communications scientist

- Education: National Institute of Technology, Raipur; Indian Institute of Technology, Roorkee; École Polytechnique Fédérale de Lausanne
- Awards: Harry H. Goode Memorial Award, 2008; Charter Fellow, NAI, 2013
- Scientific career
- Fields: Computer science, networks
- Institutions: Wayne State University; North Carolina State University; University of Cincinnati; Carnegie Mellon University
- Website: www.cs.uc.edu/~dpa/

Dharma P. Agrawal was a communications scientist who specialised in wireless sensor networks. Since 1998 he has been the Ohio Board of Regents Distinguished Professor of Electrical Engineering and Computing Systems at the University of Cincinnati. He has published work on wireless sensor networks and ad-hoc computing, and was one of the editors of the Encyclopedia on Ad Hoc and Ubiquitous Computing in 2009.

== Affiliations and awards ==
Agrawal was a fellow of the National Academy of Inventors, the Institute of Electrical and Electronics Engineers for contributions to parallel system architecture, interconnection networks and computer arithmetic, the Association for Computing Machinery, the American Association for the Advancement of Science and the World Innovation Foundation.

Agrawal received the Third Millennium Medal of the IEEE Computer Society in 2000, and the Harry H. Goode Memorial Award of the same society in 2008. He was a Fulbright Senior Specialist (2002–2007), and was on the ISI Highly Cited Researcher list in 2001. He received the Hind Rattan of the NRI Welfare Society of India in 2011. In 2013 he was named a charter fellow of the National Academy of Inventors.
