= Average memory access time =

Computer performance metric

In computer science, Average Memory Access Time (AMAT) is a common metric to analyze computer memory system performance.

== Metric ==
AMAT uses hit time, miss penalty, and miss rate to measure memory performance. It accounts for the fact that hits and misses affect memory system performance differently. In addition, AMAT can be extended recursively to multiple layers of the memory hierarchy. It focuses on how locality and cache misses affect overall performance and allows for a quick analysis of different cache design techniques. A tacit assumption of AMAT is that a data access is either a hit or a miss, meaning the memory only supports sequential accesses and cannot have multiple accesses occurring simultaneously. Recently AMAT has been extended to consider concurrent data access. A model, called Concurrent-AMAT (C-AMAT), is introduced for more accurate analysis of current memory systems. More information on C-AMAT can be found in the external links section.

AMAT's three parameters hit time (or hit latency), miss rate, and miss penalty provide a quick analysis of memory systems. Hit latency (H) is the time to hit in the cache. Miss rate (MR) is the frequency of cache misses, while average miss penalty (AMP) is the cost of a cache miss in terms of time. Concretely it can be defined as follows.

$$\mathrm{AMAT} = H + MR \cdot \mathrm{AMP}$$

It can also be defined recursively as,

$$\mathrm{AMAT} = H_1 + MR_1 \cdot \mathrm{AMP}_1$$

where

$$\mathrm{AMP}_1 = H_2 + MR_2 \cdot \mathrm{AMP}_2$$

In this manner, this recursive definition can be extended throughout all layers of the memory hierarchy.
