= Yale Patt =

American academic and engineer

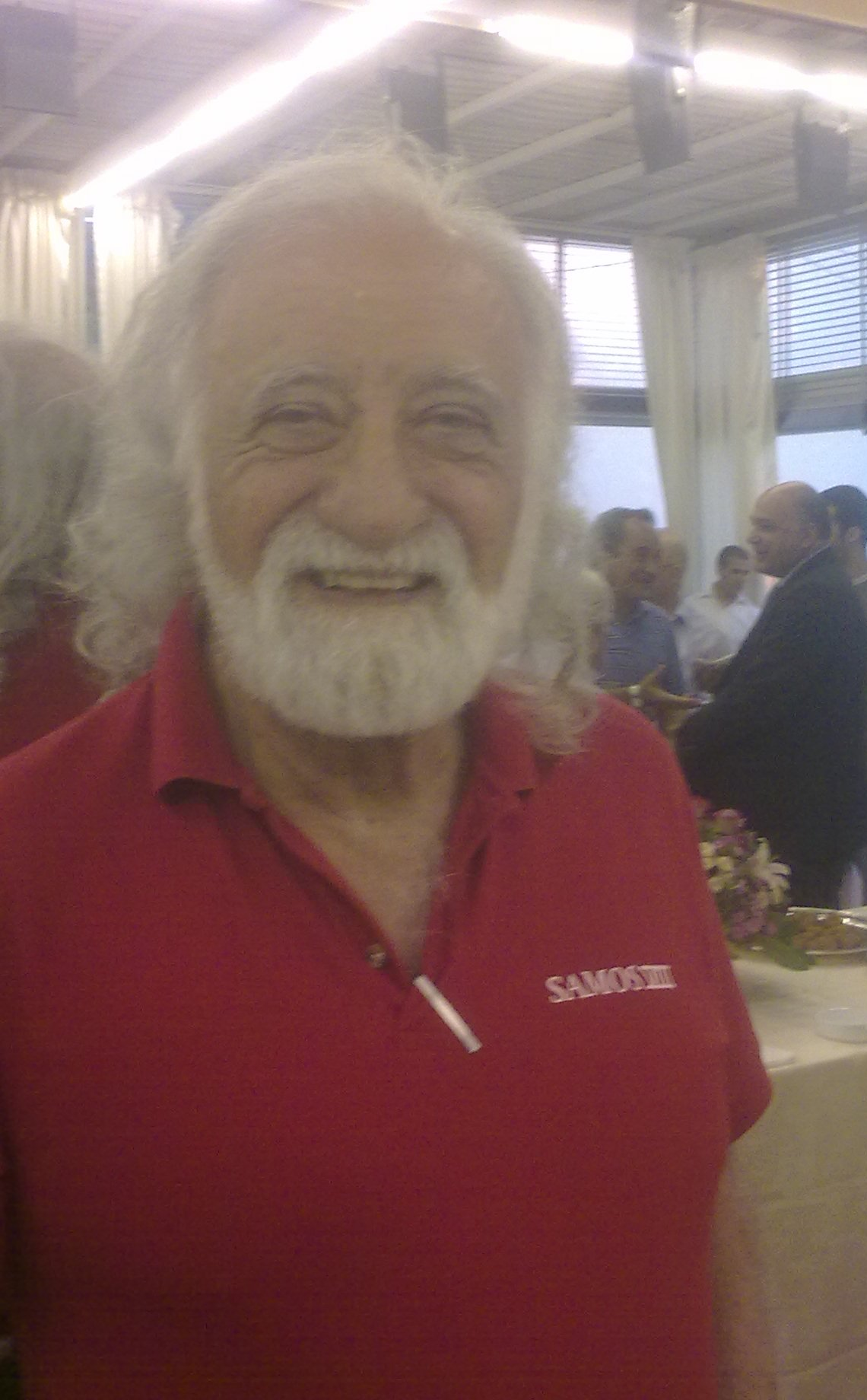
- Education: Northeastern University (BS); Stanford University (MS, PhD)
- Awards: Fellow of the Institute of Electrical and Electronics Engineers; Fellow of the Association for Computing Machinery
- Scientific career
- Fields: Computer engineering
- Workplaces: University of Texas at Austin; University of Michigan; University of California-Berkeley
- Doctoral advisor: Richard Mattson
- Doctoral students: Wen-mei Hwu, Onur Mutlu
- Website: users.ece.utexas.edu/~patt/

Yale Nance Patt is an American professor of electrical and computer engineering at the University of Texas at Austin. He holds the Ernest Cockrell, Jr. Centennial Chair in Engineering. In 1965, Patt introduced the WOS module, the first complex logic gate implemented on a single piece of silicon. He is a fellow of both the Institute of Electrical and Electronics Engineers and the Association for Computing Machinery, and in 2014 he was elected to the National Academy of Engineering.

Patt received his bachelor's degree at Northeastern University and his master's degree and doctorate at Stanford University, all in electrical engineering. His doctoral advisor was Richard Mattson.

Patt has spent much of his career pursuing aggressive ILP, out-of-order, and speculative computer architectures, such as HPSm, the High Performance Substrate for Microprocessors.

Patt is the co-author of the textbook, Introduction to Computing Systems: From Bits and Gates to C and Beyond, currently published in its third edition by McGraw-Hill. It is used as the course textbook for Patt's undergraduate Introduction to Computing class at University of Texas at Austin, as well as the Introduction to Computing course at University of Illinois at Urbana Champaign, Introduction to Computer Systems at University of Pennsylvania, Computer Organization and Programming at Georgia Institute of Technology, and Introduction to Computer Engineering at University of Wisconsin Madison. It is in this textbook that the LC-3 Assembly Language is introduced.

In 2009, Patt received an honorary doctorate from the University of Belgrade.

== Teaching ==
- 1966–1967 Cornell University
- 1969–1976 North Carolina State University, Assistant Professor of Electrical Engineering
- 1976–1988 San Francisco State University, Professor of Computer Science and Mathematics
- 1979–1988 University of California-Berkeley, Adjunct Professor of Computer Science
- 1988–1999 University of Michigan, Professor of Computer Science and Engineering
- 1999–present University of Texas, Professor of Electrical and Computer Engineering

== Awards ==
- 1995 IEEE Emanuel R. Piore Award "for contributions to computer architecture leading to commercially viable high performance microprocessors"
- 1996 Eckert–Mauchly Award "for important contributions to instruction level parallelism and superscalar processor design"
- 1999 IEEE Wallace W. McDowell Award "for your impact on the high performance microprocessor industry via a combination of important contributions to both engineering and education"
- 2005 IEEE Computer Society Charles Babbage Award "for fundamental contributions to high performance processor design"
- 2011 IEEE Computer Society B. Ramakrishna Rau Award “for significant contributions and inspiring leadership in the microarchitecture community with respect to teaching, mentoring, research, and service”
- 2013 Harry H. Goode Memorial Award "for nearly half a century of significant contributions to information processing, including microarchitecture insights, a breakaway textbook, and mentoring future leaders"
- 2014 Elected to the National Academy of Engineering "for contributions to high-performance microprocessor architecture"
- 2016 Benjamin Franklin Medal in Computer and Cognitive Science "for his pioneering contributions to the design of modern microprocessors that achieve higher performance by automatically identifying computer instructions that can be performed simultaneously"
- 2021 IEEE High Performance Computer Architecture Symposium Test of Time Award
