= Algirdas Avižienis =

Lithuanian-American computer scientist

- Education: University of Illinois Urbana-Champaign (BS, MS, and PhD in electrical engineering)
- Occupation: Computer scientist
- Scientific career
- Fields: Fault-tolerant computing Dependability; Computer arithmetic

Algirdas Avižienis is a Lithuanian-American computer scientist. He was a distinguished professor at the University of California, Los Angeles, and was known for his work in fault-tolerant computing.

In 1973, Avižienis was named a fellow of the Institute of Electrical and Electronics Engineers, "for fundamental contributions in the field of fault-tolerant computing".
