= Mark D. Hill =

Mark D. Hill is a computer scientist and professor at the University of Wisconsin–Madison. He has been cited over 27,000 times.

He is the John P. Morgridge Professor and Gene M. Amdahl Professor of Computer Science. Hill specializes in computer architecture, parallel computing, memory systems, and performance evaluation.

He was named an Association for Computing Machinery Fellow in 2004 for "contributions to memory consistency models and memory system design", and was awarded the ACM SIGARCH Alan D. Berenbaum Distinguished Service Award in 2009.

In 2019, he received the 2019 ACM - IEEE CS Eckert-Mauchly Award for "seminal contributions to the fields of cache memories, memory consistency models, transactional memory, and simulation." He served as Chair of the Computing Community Consortium.

Hill earned a B.S.E. in Computer Engineering from the University of Michigan in 1981, an M.S. in Computer Science in 1983 and a Ph.D. in computer science from the University of California, Berkeley in 1987.

== Selected research ==
- Binkert, Nathan, et al. "The gem5 simulator." ACM SIGARCH Computer Architecture News 39.2 (2011): 1–7.
- Martin, Milo MK, et al. "Multifacet's general execution-driven multiprocessor simulator (GEMS) toolset." ACM SIGARCH Computer Architecture News 33.4 (2005): 92–99.
- Hill, Mark D., and Michael R. Marty. "Amdahl's law in the multicore era." Computer 41.7 (2008): 33–38.
- Adve, Sarita V., and Mark D. Hill. "Weak ordering—a new definition." [1990] Proceedings. The 17th Annual International Symposium on Computer Architecture. IEEE, 1990.
- Moore, Kevin E., et al. "LogTM: Log-based transactional memory." The Twelfth International Symposium on High-Performance Computer Architecture, 2006.. IEEE, 2006.
- Hill, Mark D., and Alan Jay Smith. "Evaluating associativity in CPU caches." IEEE Transactions on Computers 38.12 (1989): 1612–1630.
