= Google Web Accelerator =

Web accelerator produced by Google

Google Web
- Release: May 4, 2005
- Final release: 0.2.70 / January 20, 2008
- Operating system: Microsoft Windows
- Website: webaccelerator.google.com

Google Web Accelerator was a web accelerator produced by Google. It used client software installed on the user's computer, as well as data caching on Google's servers, to speed up page load times by means of data compression, prefetching of content, and sharing cached data between users. The beta, released on May 4, 2005, works with Mozilla Firefox 1.0+ and Internet Explorer 5.5+ on Windows 2000 SP3+, Windows XP, Windows Server 2003, Windows Vista and Windows 7 machines. It was discontinued in October 2008.

== Bugs and privacy issues ==
It was discovered that Google Web Accelerator had a tendency to prevent YouTube videos from playing, instead displaying an error message stating that the video was no longer available.

Google Web Accelerator sent requests for web pages, except for secure web pages (HTTPS), to Google, which logged these requests. Some web pages embedded personal information in these page requests.

Google received and temporarily cached cookie data that the user's computer sent with webpage requests in order to improve performance.

Google Web Accelerator crawled every web page it came across, leading it to inadvertently deleting web pages when it indiscriminately prefetched links.

In order to speed up delivery of content, Google Web Accelerator sometimes retrieved webpage content that the user did not request and stored it in the Google Web Accelerator cache. Cached versions of web pages that were created when one user was logged in were sometimes served to other users, allowing them to see private account information.

Some privacy experts expressed concern that Google could "combine personal and clickstream data with existing search history data contained in Google's own cookie to create a far-reaching profile" on users.

== Related ==
- Google Search
- Opera Turbo
