= Alan Jay Smith =

American computer scientist

Alan Jay Smith (born April, 1949) is a computer scientist and researcher in the field of development and applications of caching strategies and the measurement and analysis of computer storage systems with many important contributions to the field. He currently is professor emeritus at the EECS faculty of the University of California, Berkeley.

== Selected awards ==
- 1988: IEEE Fellow
- 2001: ACM Fellow for "his highly cited paper on cache memories, for his contributions to performance measurement, and for his leadership in professional society activities"
- 2003: A. A. Michelson Award by the Computer Measurement Group
- 2006: Harry H. Goode Memorial Award by the IEEE Computer Society for "leadership in the measurement and evaluation of cache and memory system performance"
- 2008: IEEE Reynold B. Johnson Information Storage Systems Award for "contributions to the performance analysis of computer storage systems, including improvements to disk caches, prefetching and data placement"
