= Amat =

Amat may refer to:

== Names ==
- Amat (surname), surname of Provençal/Catalan origin
- Amat (name prefix), Arabic female name prefix

== People ==
- Ismail Amat (1935–2018), Uyghur politician of China
- Zain Amat (born 1975), Singaporean trap shooter

== Other uses ==
- Annie Maunder Astrographic Telescope at the Royal Observatory, Greenwich
- Applied Materials, US semiconductor manufacturing equipment supplier, NASDAQ symbol
- Average memory access time, a performance metric in computer architecture
