= Amat (name prefix) =

Female Arabic prefix

Amat (Arabic: امة) is a word meaning "female slave" or "servant", used in conjunction with an Islamic name of God to form a female given name. Examples of such names and their bearers are:

- Amat Al Alim Alsoswa (born 1958), Yemeni politician
- Amatu'l-Bahá Rúhíyyih Khánum (1910 – 2000), wife of Shoghi Effendi, Guardian of the Baháʼí Faith
- Amatul Kibria Keya Chowdhury, Bangladesh Awami League politician
- Amat al-Razzak Hammed, Yemeni Minister for social affairs
- Amat-Mamu (fl. c. 1750 BC), Babylonian scribe
