= Amat al-Razzak Hammed =

Yemeni professor and politician

Amat al-Razzak Hammed is a Yemeni professor and politician. In 2008, she was the Minister for Social Affairs, supporting punitive measures for those who enable child marriage in Yemen.
