= Amat-Mamu =

Babylonian scribe

Amat-Mamu (c. 1764 BC - c. 1711 BC) was a Babylonian nadītu priestess. She lived in a closed nadītu community in Sippar, where she worked as a scribe.

Amat-Mamu was born around 1764 BC, and she was consecrated as a Babylonian nadītu, a priestess of the god Shamash. Her name translates to "woman servant of Mamu", Mamu being the daughter of Shamash. As a nadītu, Amat-Mamu lived in a walled quarter in Sippar, the gagûm, which was separated from the rest of the city. She was allowed to own land, but not to marry or have children.

Amat-Mamu worked as a scribe in the gagûm. Though the scribes were traditionally men in Sippar, the nadītu rarely interacted with men. Because of this, Amat-Mamu was one of several women in the community who was taught to read and write so she could work as a scribe when no men were present. Archeologists know of her role as a scribe because they were expected to sign their names to tablets that they produced. Three known documents that Amat-Mamu produced were under three different kings—Hammurabi, Samsu-iluna, and Abi-Eshuh—indicating that she worked as a scribe for at least 40 years. She died around 1711 BC. Though works to female scribes were common under the reigns of Hammurabi and Samsu-iluna, Amat-Mamu is the only female scribe to have a surviving work by the time of Abi-Eshuh.

Amat-Mamu was one of the women whose names were written on the Heritage Floor of the installation artwork The Dinner Party.
