= Centre for High Performance =

English research institute

The Centre for High Performance
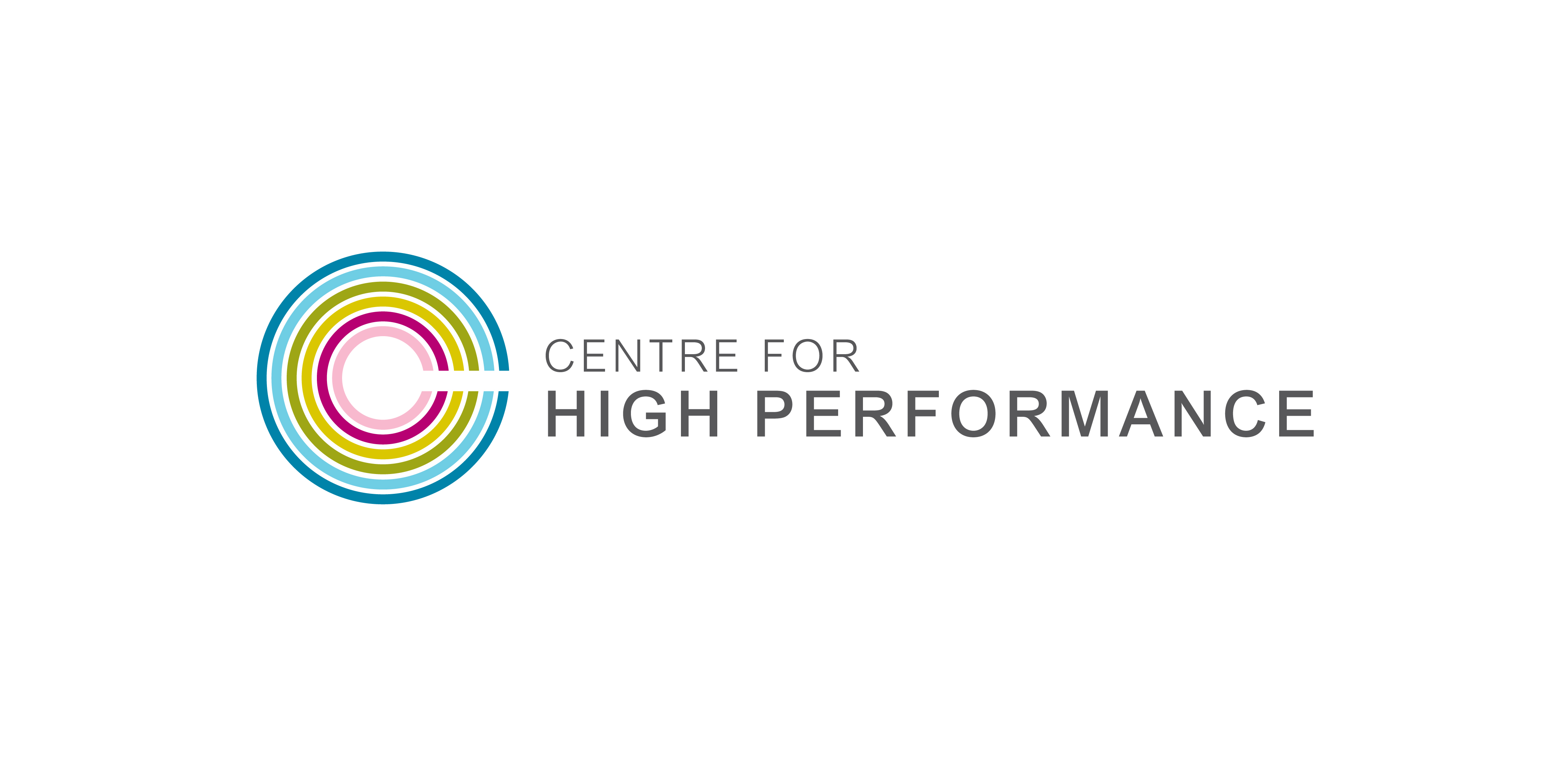
- The Centre's logo
- Founded: 2010
- Founder: Alex Hill
- Headquarters: London, United Kingdom
- Region served: UK
- Official languages: English
- Lead Research: Alex Hill
- Website: high-performance.org

The Centre for High Performance (informally The centre) is a research group of senior faculty at Kingston University, Duke CE, London Business School, and Green Templeton College, Oxford University that specializes in organizational performance and works with British Boxing, Eton College, the Royal College of Art, and the Royal Shakespeare Company among others. Founded by Alex Hill, Professor at Kingston University, contributions are made from Liz Mellon, executive director at Duke Corporate Education, Jules Goddard, Fellow at London Business School, and Terry Hill, emeritus fellow at Green Templeton College, Oxford University.

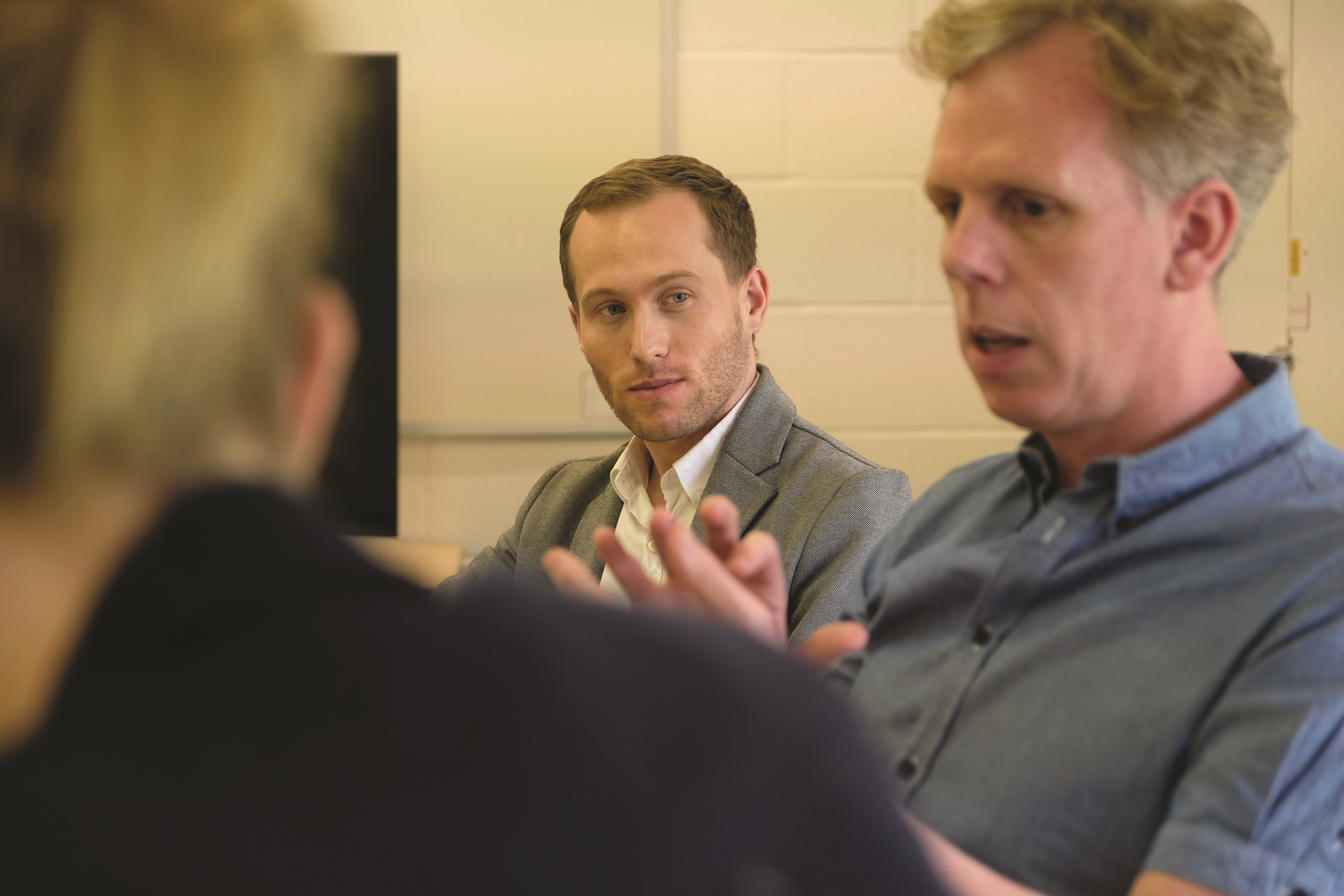
Founder Alex Hill with Benjamin Laker

== Research ==
Between 2010 and 2015, The Centre observed improvement made by 160 academy schools after they were put into special measures by OFSTED. The collected data was shared with Andrew Day, executive director (CEO) of The Northumberland Church of England Academy; Carolyn Robson CBE, executive principal of Rushey Mead Academy; David Bateson OBE, chair of EMLC Academy Trust Strategic Board; George Gyte, adviser to the Department for Education and Tony Blair's Prime Minister's Delivery Unit; Professor Sir George Berwick, CEO of Challenge Partners; Dame Sally Coates, Director of Academies for United Learning and Laura McInerney, Guardian columnist and editor of Schools Week, who described it as "some of the most powerful and engaging ever seen in education research".

The methodology was presented to the 2015 British Academy of Management conference in Portsmouth, and the preliminary findings were presented to the 2016 Global Education and Skills Forum conference in Dubai and published the following day by The Times, The Daily Telegraph, The Oxford Mail and the Yorkshire Post. The full findings were sent to The Department for Education as an SSRN academic paper and published by The Independent. The UK government responded by launching an inquiry into the performance, accountability, and governance of academy schools. The Department for Education subsequently released a white paper and created the 'Education for All Bill' to "stamp out the practice of academies that exclude pupils to skew their results and claim rapid improvements after The Centre for High Performance revealed some trusts excluded pupils to change the profile of their intake and boost results."

Following this policy change the Centre wrote 'How to Turn Around a Failing School,' the first article on UK schools to be published by Harvard Business Review, who lauded this influential work as "research gold". Three days later The Centre published an article in Duke CE's Dialogue Journal titled 'Why English schools hold the secret to high business performance' suggesting "organizations cannot be turned around with one simple idea or single action."

== Leadership ==
In 2016, The Centre investigated the impact of different types of leaders on performance, beginning with the so-called "superhead" system of executive head teachers. The findings of this study were published by Schools Week and The Times. Lead research Alex Hill concluded: "When a school emerges from a period with a superhead, you've lost three years, sometimes longer, and you've spent a load of money you didn't need to. You are now behind where you could have been, both in terms of the impact on students but also on your community."

Eight months later, the Centre wrote 'The One Type of Leader Who Can Turn Around a Failing School'.
