= Andrew Leon Hanna =

American lawyer and entrepreneur

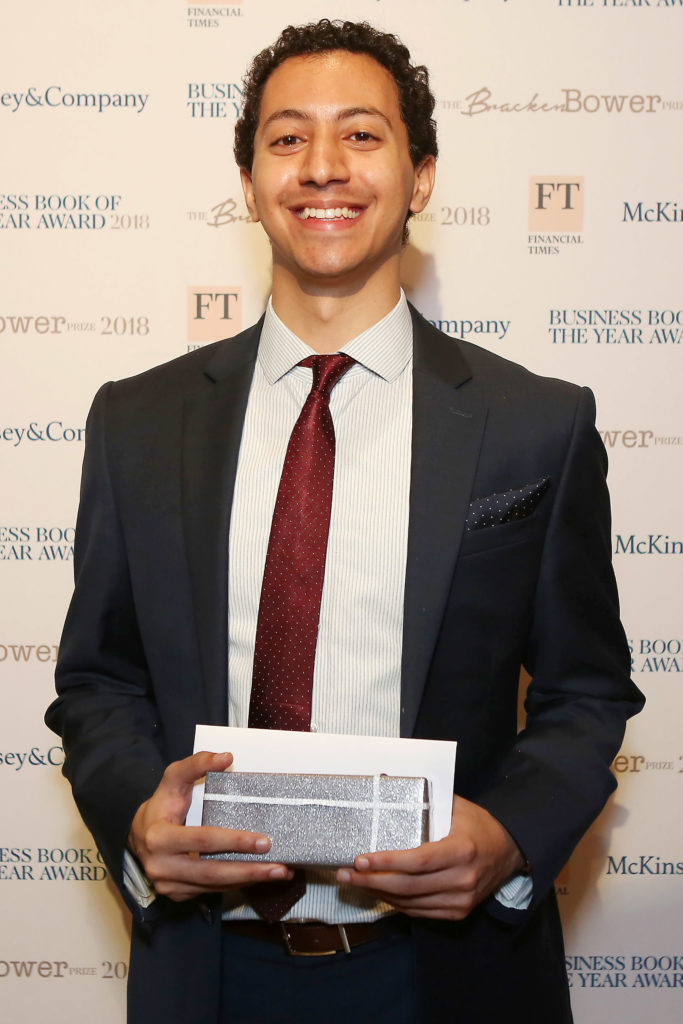
- Andrew Leon Hanna at The National Gallery, London, UK
- Born: Jacksonville, FL, U.S.
- Education: Harvard Law School (JD); Stanford Graduate School of Business (MBA); Duke University (BA)
- Notable work: 25 Million Sparks: The Untold Story of Refugee Entrepreneurs (book); DreamxAmerica (film)

Andrew Leon Hanna is an American entrepreneur, lawyer, author, and professor at the University of Chicago Booth School of Business. He is the co-founder of Mona. He is also the author of 25 Million Sparks: The Untold Story of Refugee Entrepreneurs (Cambridge University Press), which was named a Financial Times Best Book of the Year and the winner of the Bracken Bower Prize.

== Education ==
Hanna, who was born and raised in Jacksonville, Florida and whose parents immigrated from Egypt, received a bachelor's degree in public policy from Duke University, where he was a Robertson Scholar, senior class president, and recipient of the Terry Sanford Leadership Award. Hanna received a J.D. from Harvard Law School, where he was a Harvard Law Review editor, Harvard African Law Association board member, and recipient of the Oberman Prize for Law and Social Change. Hanna earned his MBA at Stanford Graduate School of Business, where he was a Siebel Scholar, Arjay Miller Scholar, and Knight-Hennessy Scholar.

== Career ==
Hanna is the co-founder of Mona, an AI platform supporting small businesses that was named to Fast Company's World Changing Ideas List. Hanna is the author of 25 Million Sparks: The Untold Story of Refugee Entrepreneurs, published by Cambridge University Press. The book tells the stories of three Syrian women entrepreneurs in the Zaatari refugee camp and of refugee entrepreneurs around the world. It was named a Financial Times Best Book of the Year and the winner of the Bracken Bower Prize.

Hanna is also the co-creator of DreamxAmerica, a film launched at the Harvard Innovation Labs that highlights immigrant, refugee, and first-generation entrepreneurs. The documentary premiered in November 2020 in collaboration with PBS Chicago (WTTW), and was nominated for a Chicago Emmy Award. Hanna was previously a consultant at McKinsey & Company and served in the White House and United States Department of Justice. In 2011, Hanna was one of two American delegates selected by the United States Department of State to represent the United States at the 7th UNESCO Youth Forum in Paris, France. In December 2019, Hanna was named one of Forbes 30 Under 30 in Law and Policy.

== Notable works ==
Nonfiction

- 25 Million Sparks: The Untold Story of Refugee Entrepreneurs (Cambridge University Press)

Film

- DreamxAmerica (PBS)
