= Follow the Other Hand =

2006 book by Andy Cohen

Follow The Other Hand. A Remarkable Fable That Will Energize Your Business, Profits and Life is a business book by Duke CE faculty and NYU adjunct professor Andy Cohen. Published in 2006, Follow The Other Hand was reviewed by Paul S. Brown of The New York Times and featured in many business magazines.

== Overview ==
This book is a business novella using magic as a metaphor to change the readers’ behavior and empower the reader to think out of the box. The author believes that Innovation begins by challenging assumptions. The term, Follow the Other Hand, is derived from a sleight of hand magic trick that reminds people that what they assume to be true is actually a belief. And if they follow that belief they will be misdirected such as in magic. But if they challenge the assumption; in essence, follow the other hand, they will find the secret or a new business solution that did not exist before. The book uses lessons instead of chapters. Each lesson ends with instructions for a magic trick supporting the premise of that lesson.

== Case Histories ==
The book includes business case histories of companies large and small that challenge the assumptions of their competitors to create successful products and services. Case histories include: Axe (Lynx), a body spray, manufactured by Unilever; OnStar, a telematic service from General Motors, Build-A-Bear Workshop, a retail operation created by Maxine Clark, Proofreadnow.com, an innovative online service, M&M's, a confectionery manufactured by Mars Incorporated, Jones Soda, a soft drink manufacturer and Crest Spinbrush, a packaged good products created from a partnership between John Osher and Procter & Gamble.
