= MIT Sloan Management Review =

Business journal

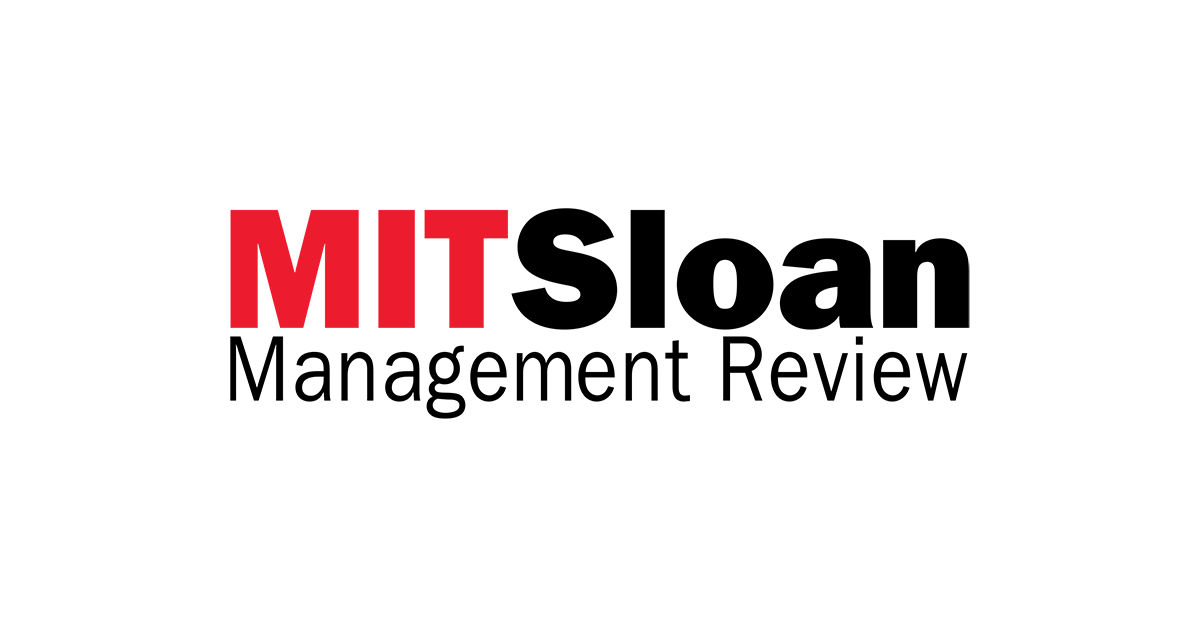
- Editor: Abbie Lundberg, David Kiron, Elizabeth Heichler
- Categories: Management, technology, business
- Frequency: Daily online, quarterly in print
- Publisher: MIT Sloan School of Management
- First issue: 1959
- Country: United States
- Website: sloanreview.mit.edu
- ISSN: 1532-9194
- OCLC: 909576727

MIT Sloan Management Review (MIT SMR) is a magazine and multiplatform publisher. It features research-based articles on strategic leadership, digital innovation, and sustainable business. It aims to give readers practical, of-the-moment guidance for leading in an ever-shifting world. MIT SMR publishes in print quarterly and online daily. It creates content across various media, including web, app, podcast, live and recorded video, and via distributors and libraries worldwide.

MIT Sloan Management Review has published articles by Nancy Baym, Clayton Christensen, Thomas H. Davenport, Nancy Duarte, Amy Edmondson, Nicolai J. Foss, Vijay Govindarajan, Lynda Gratton, Gary Hamel, Linda Hill, Peter G. Klein, Mary Lacity, Benjamin Laker, Rita Gunther McGrath, Pamela Meyer, C.K. Prahalad, and Thomas J. Roulet.

== Background ==
MIT Sloan Management Review was established as Industrial Management Review in 1959. In 1970, the magazine was renamed Sloan Management Review. In 2001, Sloan Management Review added MIT to its name, becoming MIT Sloan Management Review. MIT SMR is editorially independent from the Massachusetts Institute of Technology and MIT Sloan School of Management. In May 2026, MIT announced that the last issue of the magazine would be published in September 2026.

== Editorial Mission ==
MIT Sloan Management Review leads the discourse about advances in management practice among influential thought leaders in business and academia. It equips its readers with evidence-based insights and guidance to innovate, operate, lead, and create value in a world being transformed by technology and large-scale societal and environmental forces.

== The Future of Work ==
MIT Sloan Management Review hosts an annual virtual summit on the future of work. Each summit brings together experts from industry and academia to discuss a wide variety of workplace- and workforce-related topics, including talent management, workforce organization, and digital transformation. The goal of each summit is to provide leaders with an outlook on the year ahead and prepare them for the coming shifts to how, when, where, and why we work.

== Culture 500 ==
The Culture 500 ranks more than 500 of the largest corporations operating in the United States by how favorably employees rate their corporate culture. The initiative, which started as an MIT research project, is a collaboration between MIT Sloan Management Review and CultureX. It is the largest systematic study of corporate culture ever conducted. It analyzes 1.4 million Glassdoor employee reviews from more than 500 companies and uses natural language processing developed by CultureX to identify culturally significant terms at 90% or higher accuracy. The list measures nine cultural values: agility, collaboration, customer orientation, diversity, execution, innovation, integrity, performance, and respect. Starting in 2020, The Culture 500 began releasing Culture Champions, a list of corporations that surpass industry standards for the nine Culture 500 cultural values and meet other noteworthy criteria, such as ranking in the 30th percentile for overall culture and exhibiting high rates of diversity, integrity, and respect.

== Big Ideas ==
MIT Sloan Management Review’s Big Ideas initiatives explore key trends at the intersection of technology and management. The initiatives use a collaborative research model that engages MIT SMR editorial staff, academic guest editors, and thought leaders from consulting firms, foundations, and dedicated research groups. Research is conducted via global surveys of and in-depth interviews with front-line leaders, many of whom work at Fortune 500 companies. Big Ideas initiatives are multiplatform, with findings published as case studies, videos, articles, annual research reports, and interactive data visualizations.
