= Mouallem =

Mouallem (Arabic: المعلّم) is an Arabic surname. Notable people with the surname include:

- Aya Mouallem (born 1998), Lebanese electrical engineer and researcher
- Boutros Mouallem (1928–2026), Palestine-Israeli Melkite Greek Catholic hierarch
- Omar Mouallem (born 1985), Canadian writer and filmmaker

== See also ==
- Walid Muallem (1941–2020), Syrian politician and diplomat
