= LID Publishing =

Spanish publishing house

LID Publishing, more commonly referred to as "LID", is a publishing and communications company founded in 1993. Specialising in general business publications for the professional reader LID is headquartered in Madrid and London with satellite offices in Mexico City, Shanghai, New Delhi, New York City, Buenos Aires and Bogotá. LID is a member of The Business Publishers Roundtable.

== Publications ==
=== Non-fiction books & biographies ===
LID publishes 125 general interest and professional business books and biographies each year.

In 2017 LID Publishing launched a biography series of Chinese entrepreneurs. Featured entrepreneurs to date include Jack Ma, Wang Jianlin, Ma Huateng, Ren Zhengfei and Dong Mingzhu.

LID's series of short business books named "The Concise Advice Series" has featured authors including psychologist Sir Cary Cooper and Sanyin Siang.

=== Professional journals ===
Under the moniker 'LID Publishing Media', the publisher produces professional journals for leadership and management audiences. Topics include industrial and organizational psychology, marketing, sales, technology, innovation and finance. Significant contributors include behavioural psychologist Dan Ariely and Linda Papadopoulos and leadership author Marshall Goldsmith. As of 2019 LID publishes official Duke Corporate Education journal, Dialogue Review, Institute of Leadership & Management journal, Edge, and the members-only magazine of The Chartered Institute of Marketing, Catalyst.

=== Podcast ===
LID's corporate podcast, LID Radio, examines current trends and interviews industry experts and influencers in business, entrepreneurship, smart thinking and personal development.

== Notable publications ==
- Disruption Denial, David Guillebaud - CMI 'Management Book of the Year', 2018 - Shortlisted in the Management Future category
- Business Book Award winner in the Advertising/Marketing/PR/Event Planning category, 2016
- Madison Avenue Manslaughter: An Inside View of Fee-Cutting Clients, Profit-Hungry Owners and Declining Ad Agencies, Michael Farmer - Gold Axiom Award winner, 2016
- The Old Rush: Marketing for Gold in the Age of Aging, Peter Hubbell - Bronze Axiom Business Book Award winner in the Advertising/Marketing/PR/Event Planning category, 2015
- Not Knowing, Steven D’Souza and Diana Renner - Chartered Management Institute ‘Management Book of the Year’, 2014
- Brands & Rousers: The Holistic System to Foster High-Performing Businesses, Brands and Careers, Luis Gallardo - Silver Axiom Business Book Award winner in the Advertising/Marketing/PR/Event Planning category, 2014
