= Maike van Niekerk =

Canadian activist and entrepreneur

Maike van Niekerk is a Canadian activist, author, entrepreneur, research scientist and resident doctor. She was born in Windhoek, Namibia, but raised in Corner Brook, Newfoundland. She founded the cancer charity Katrin's Karepackage, following the death of her mother, Katrin Kohler.

== Katrin's Karepackage ==
Van Niekerk's mother, Katrin Kohler, was diagnosed with breast cancer when van Niekerk was aged eight. She survived the first bout, but died seven years later when the cancer returned. Following her mother's death, van Niekerk began volunteering for the Canadian Cancer Society. In 2014, van Niekerk founded Katrin's Karepackage, a charity that offsets the travel costs for cancer patients living in Newfoundland and in Nova Scotia, and fundraised $35,000 by cycling 1,000 kilometres (620 mi) across Newfoundland. In 2015, she ran seven marathons on seven consecutive days for a fundraiser. By September 2018, the charity had raised over $170,000.

== Education ==
Van Niekerk completed a Bachelor of Science in Nursing at Dalhousie University, having won a Schulich Leader Scholarship. At Dalhousie University, she received the Silver Governor General's Academic Medal in 2017 for obtaining the highest academic standing amongst all baccalaureate graduates. In the same year, van Niekerk was awarded a Rhodes Scholarship, which allowed her to start a three-year PhD in Psychiatry at the University of Oxford, graduating in 2020. In 2020, she was awarded a Knight-Hennessy Scholarship, which allowed her to begin medicine at Stanford University. She graduated with a Doctor of Medicine degree in 2025 and is currently completing her residency at Harvard University as part of the Harvard Combined Orthopaedic Residency Program.

== Awards ==
Van Niekerk has been awarded a Meritorious Service Decoration. She received a Canadian Red Cross award for Newfoundland and Labrador's Young Humanitarian of the Year. In 2015, van Niekerk was one of Plan Canada's Top 20 Under 20. In 2017, van Niekerk was one of 100 people on the Women's Executive Network list of Canada's Most Powerful Women. In 2018, van Niekerk was one of ten honourees in the L'Oréal Paris Canadian Women of Worth Grant Award Program.

== Bibliography ==
- Niekerk, Maike van (2017). Faces Facing Cancer. ISBN 9781389363368.
