= Saadia Zahidi =

Pakistani-Swiss economist

- سعدیہ زاہدی
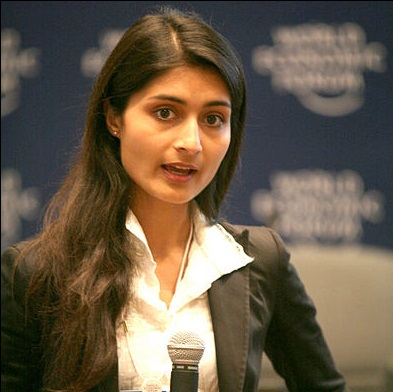
- Zahidi in 2009

Director General of the International Air Transport Association (IATA)
- Incumbent
- Assumed office 2018

Personal details
- Born: 1980 (age 45–46) Lahore, Pakistan
- Citizenship: Pakistani & Swiss
- Education: Smith College (B.A.); Graduate Institute Geneva (MPhil); Harvard University (MPA)
- Awards: Fifty Million Rising: The New Generation of Working Women Transforming the Muslim World (2018) - longlisted for the 2018 Financial Times and McKinsey Business Book of the Year Award

Saadia Zahidi (Note: Urdu: سعدیہ زاہدی) (born 1980) is a Pakistani-Swiss economist and Director General of the International Air Transport Association (IATA). She took office in November 2026 as IATA's ninth Director General and the first woman to hold the post. Before joining IATA, she spend more than two decades at the World Economic Forum (WEF). She co-authored the WEF's Future of Jobs, Global Gender Gap and Global Risks Reports. She has served on the United Nations Secretary General's high level panel on women's economic empowerment and on the European Space Agency's (ESA) high level advisory group on human and robotic space exploration. Zahidi is also the author of Fifty Million Rising: The New Generation of Working Women Transforming the Muslim World (2018).

== Early life and education ==
Zahidi was born in Lahore, Pakistan in 1980. She is a citizen of Pakistan and Switzerland.

Zahidi holds a bachelor's degree in economics from Smith College in Northampton, Massachusetts, a master's in international economics from the Geneva Graduate Institute, and a master of public administration (MPA) from Harvard University in Cambridge, Massachusetts. She speaks four languages.

== Career ==
Zahidi started her career at the World Economic Forum (WEF) in Switzerland as an economist in 2003. She was the youngest person to be appointed managing director and board member at the World Economic Forum in 2018. Zahidi heads the WEF's Centre for the New Economy and Society responsible for economy, human capital, development and equity agendas at the Forum. She co-authors the Forum's Future of Jobs, Global Gender Gap and Global Risks Reports. She also leads initiatives on growth, innovation, skills, jobs, equity and social mobility.

Zahidi served on the United Nations Secretary General's high level panel on women's economic empowerment and on the European Space Agency's (ESA) high level advisory group on human and robotic space exploration.

Zahidi published the book Fifty Million Rising: The New Generation of Working Women Transforming the Muslim World in 2018, which explores the number of Muslim women who entered the global workforce between 2000 and 2015. She has highlighted how women have been integrated into the global workforce due to technology, and has discussed reasons for the gender employment gap in the international media and at TEDxLausanneWomen. As of 2025, she is also the author of 111 articles for international news publications.

On 23 July 2026, Zahidi was announced by the International Air Transport Association (IATA) as the organization's ninth Director General, effective 1 November 2026. She became the first woman to be appointed to the position in IATA's history.

== Awards ==
Zahidi's book Fifty Million Rising was longlisted for the 2018 Financial Times and McKinsey Business Book of the Year Award. Her book proposal won the inaugural Financial Times and McKinsey Bracken Bower Prize for young business authors in 2014.

Zahidi was honoured in BBC's 100 Women in 2013.
