= Waldo Family Lecture Series on International Relations =

Lecture series at Old Dominion University, Virginia, U.S.

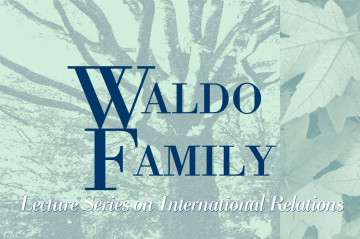
- Location: Old Dominion University
- Inaugurated: September 21, 1987
- Most recent: September 29, 2025
- Next event: TBD

The Waldo Family Lecture Series on International Relations is a lecture series which takes place at Old Dominion University in Norfolk, Virginia. The university's first endowed lecture series was endowed by the Waldo family in 1985 to honor the memories of Loren Pierce Waldo, Jr., William Joseph Waldo, Robert Hendren Waldo, Susan Waldo O'Hara, Julia Ann Waldo Campbell, and Harry Creekmur Waldo. International Relations was chosen as the topic for the lecture series due to the University's proximity to the International Port of Hampton Roads and the presence in Norfolk of the world's largest naval installation. Beginning in 1987, guest speakers for the lectures have come from such diverse fields as government, public service, foreign affairs, and journalism. Lectures have had such themes as "The Future of the West in a Changing World," "Human Rights in the 21st Century", "America in the World - All Tactics, No Strategy," and "Regaining Strategic Competence: Empathy as the Foundation of Foreign Policy and National Security Strategy," and have discussed such issues as the shortage of doctors in third-world countries, the 2008 financial crisis, and the diminishing role of Congress in the United States.

The 2025 lecture took place September 29, 2025, at Old Dominion University and featured Admiral Samuel Paparo, four-star admiral of the United States Navy, former commander of the United States Pacific Fleet and current commander of the United States Indo-Pacific Command.

== Past speakers ==
- George S. McGovern (1987), Senator, U.S. Presidential Candidate (1972)
- John B. Anderson (1988), U.S. Presidential Candidate (Independent Party, 1980), Congressman, Executive Director of Council for National Interest
- Seymour M. Hersh (1989), Investigative Journalist, Pulitzer Prize Winner, Political Writer
- Thomas R. Pickering (1991), Ambassador to the United Nations, Under Secretary of State for Political Affairs
- James R. Schlesinger (1994), Secretary of Defense, Secretary of Energy
- Mary Robinson (2006), President of Ireland, United Nations High Commissioner for Human Rights
- John Warner (2008), U.S. Senator, Chair of Senate Armed Services Committee
- Zbigniew Brzezinski (2009), National Security Adviser (1977-1981), Bush National Security Advisory Task Force
- Frederick Kempe (2010), President of Atlantic Council
- R. Nicholas Burns (2013), Ambassador, Under Secretary of State for Political Affairs
- Colonel Jack H. Jacobs, U.S. Army, retired (2018), Medal of Honor recipient, military analyst for NBC and MSNBC, Vice-Chairman of Medal of Honor Foundation, U.S. Military Academy McDermott Chair of Politics.
- General H. R. McMaster (2023), U.S. Army, retired, retired Lieutenant General for the United States Army and National Security Advisor to President Donald Trump.
- Samuel Paparo (2025), U.S. Navy four-star admiral and commander of the United States Indo-Pacific Command.
