= Frederick Kempe =

Atlantic Council think tank head

Fred Kempe
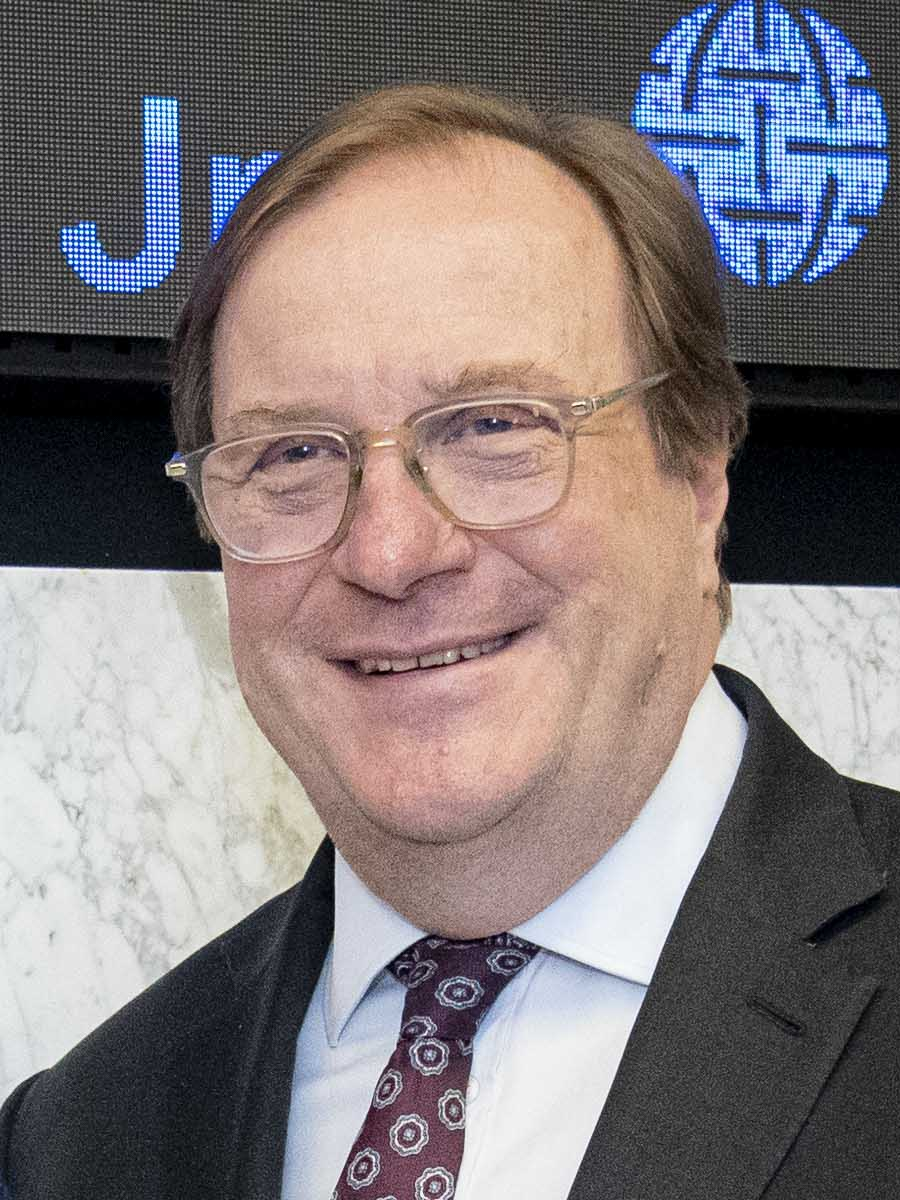
- Born: 1954 (age 71–72); Utah, U.S.
- Education: University of Utah (BA); Columbia University (MJ)
- Title: President and CEO of the Atlantic Council
- Spouse: Pamela Meyer
- Children: 1
- Website: Official website

Frederick Kempe (born 1954) is president and chief executive officer of the Atlantic Council, a foreign policy think tank and public policy group based in Washington, D.C. He is a journalist, author, columnist and a regular commentator on television and radio both in Europe and the United States. His book BERLIN 1961: Kennedy, Khrushchev and the Most Dangerous Place on Earth (Putnam) was released May 10, 2011, and was a New York Times bestseller.

== Biography ==
Born in Utah, Kempe is the son of German immigrants who came to the United States before World War II. He is a graduate of the University of Utah and earned his master's degree from Columbia University Graduate School of Journalism, where he was a member of the International Fellows program in the School of International Affairs. He lives in Washington, D.C., with his wife and daughter.

== Career ==
Kempe spent nearly thirty years with the Wall Street Journal, where he covered the rise of Solidarity in Poland, the ascent and fall of Mikhail Gorbachev in Russia, the wars in Afghanistan and Lebanon, the American invasion of Panama, the reunification of Germany and the collapse of Soviet Communism. He joined the Wall Street Journal in 1981 in London before opening the paper's Vienna bureau in 1984 and its Berlin bureau in 1990.

He won national and international prizes while serving in numerous management and reportorial capacities—editor, associate publisher, columnist and correspondent. He was most recently assistant managing editor, International, and "Thinking Global" columnist. He was previously for seven years the longest serving editor and associate publisher ever of the Wall Street Journal Europe and was European editor for the global Wall Street Journal from 2002 to 2005, also overseeing Middle Eastern reporting.

As managing editor from 1992–1997, he created the Central European Economic Review and co-founded Convergence, a magazine on Europe's digital economy.

In 2007, Kempe became president and chief executive officer of the Atlantic Council. Under his leadership, the Atlantic Council has quadrupled in size, expanding its staff, work and influence in areas that include international security, business and economics, energy, environment, and global issues of transatlantic interest, including Asia, Africa and Latin America.

For his work to strengthen the transatlantic partnership, he has been decorated by the presidents of Poland, Germany, and by King Carl XVI Gustaf of Sweden.

External videos
- Booknotes interview with Kempe on Divorcing the Dictator, March 11, 1990, C-SPAN
- Washington Journal interview with Kempe on Father/Land, May 14, 1999, C-SPAN
- After Words interview with Kempe on Berlin 1961, May 21, 2011, C-SPAN

He was until recently a regular columnist for Bloomberg News and Reuters and is a regular CNBC contributor.

In 2010, Kempe was chosen to be the lecturer for the year's installment of the Waldo Family Lecture Series on International Relations at Old Dominion University.

In 2014, he received the University of Utah's distinguished alumni award.

In 2019, Kempe was a speaker at the World Economic Forum in Davos.

== Awards ==
In 2002, the European Voice selected Kempe as "one of the 50 most influential Europeans and as one of the four leading journalists in Europe".

== Publications ==
Kempe has written four books that have been published in several languages:

- Kempe, Frederick (1990). Divorcing the Dictator: America's Bungled Affair with Noriega. G.P. Putnam's Sons NY. ISBN 0399135170.
- Kempe, Frederick (1992). Siberian Odyssey: A Voyage into the Russian Soul. Putnam Pub Group. ISBN 0399137556.
- Kempe, Frederick (1999). FATHER/LAND: A Personal Search for the New Germany. G.P. Putnam's Sons NY. ISBN 0399144978.
- Kempe, Frederick (2011). Berlin 1961: Kennedy, Khrushchev and the World’s Most Dangerous Place. Putnam Pub Group. ISBN 0399157298.
