= Benjamin Laker =

British Economist

Professor Benjamin Laker
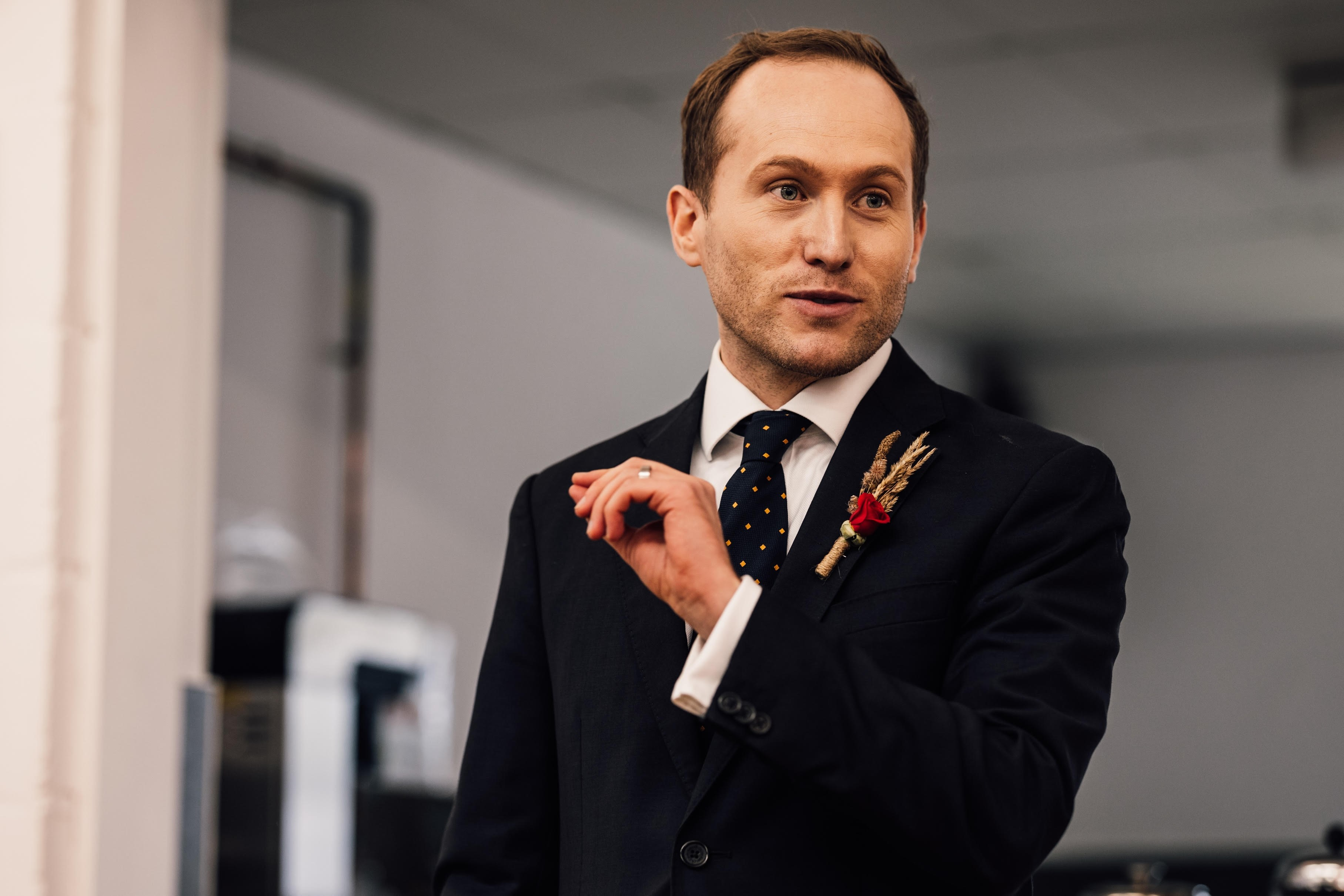
- Born: Benjamin Laker
- Known for: Scholar; Government Advisor
- Scientific career
- Workplaces: Henley Business School; Birkbeck, University of London

Benjamin Laker is a former government advisor turned scholar currently serving as Professor of Leadership and Director of Impact and Global Engagement at Henley Business School, University of Reading and Visiting Fellow at Birkbeck, University of London. His work on Economic Inequality and Environmental, Social, and Corporate Governance informs public policy, law and government inquiry.

== Career ==
Laker joined Henley Business School in 2018 as a Professor of Leadership. Soon thereafter he began writing for The Washington Post. In 2019, after reporting on the United Kingdom general election, Laker left the Post for Forbes. Once at Forbes, he established a column on economics and politics. One year later Laker was asked to advise the British HM Treasury and attend the United States House Select Committee on Economic Disparity and Fairness in Growth in order to provide legislative recommendations to the United States Congress and the Biden-Harris administration. Following these appointments Benjamin joined Birkbeck, University of London as a Visiting Fellow. Soon thereafter, he became Henley Business School's Postgraduate Research Director and Director of Impact and Global Engagement.

== Seminal work and reception ==
In 2016, having spent six years studying hundreds of academy schools located in the United Kingdom placed into special measures by Ofsted, Laker published How To Turn Around a Failing School. Laker’s paper concluded that Britain's education system was systematically failing and required urgent reform, specifically, the way that academy schools measured performance, implemented governance, and were held accountable by the Department for Education and Ofsted. The Times, The Daily Telegraph, The Independent, The Guardian and The Atlantic positively reviewed Laker’s paper and soon thereafter, Britain’s Conservative government dispatched Neil Carmichael, Chair of the Education Select Committee, to lead a public inquiry into the performance, accountability and governance of academy schools. Laker then published a sequel paper titled The One Type of Leader Who Can Turn Around a Failing School. Laker’s paper concluded that unethical school leaders were frequently rewarded with orders, decorations, and medals of the United Kingdom because Britain's education system encouraged Machiavellianism. Laker's paper received positive reviews from The Times and BBC News, and was consequently debated on Newsnight by Laker, Kirsty Wark and Michael Wilshaw, Chief Inspector of Schools and Head of Ofsted. Britain's Conservative government responded by publishing a white paper and creating new standards of ethics for school leaders to adhere to. One year later, Laker published a threequel paper titled Research: How The Best School Leaders Create Enduring Change, which proposed reforming the way that school leaders were trained. Laker's method to do so, which received endorsement from Columbia University, was positively reviewed by Tim Leunig, Chief Scientific Advisor and Chief Analyst at the Department for Education. Laker was subsequently invited to present his method to the Conservative Party Conference alongside Britain's Minister of State for School Standards, Nick Gibb. Soon thereafter, Gibb created a national qualification for school leaders to obtain. Laker was subsequently honored by Thinkers50, the global ranking of management thinkers, for his seminal contribution to the education sector.

In 2019 Laker published Europe's first empirical study of the four-day workweek. Laker’s paper, co-authored with Thomas Roulet, and titled Will the 4-Day workweek take hold in Europe? garnered critical acclaim from CNBC, The Times, The New York Times, and The New Yorker for accurately foretelling the continent's widespread adoption of shorter working weeks. In 2021, Laker published Too Proud To Lead, a Bloomsbury Publishing title on corporate and political collapses and scandals which received critical receptions from the Daily Telegraph the Financial Times and Sky News.

One year later, Laker established the concept of ‘meeting-free days’ by publishing MIT Sloan Management Review’s most widely-read paper of 2022 titled The Surprising Impact of Meeting-Free Days. Soon thereafter, Laker published a sequel paper in Harvard Business Review which explained how adopting two meeting-free days per week significantly increases organisational productivity and employee engagement. Laker’s papers garnered critical acclaim from Inc, The Wall Street Journal, Time, the Newstatesman, The Atlantic, Fortune, the Financial Times, and Psychology Today. Microsoft subsequently included Laker’s 'meeting-free days' within their annual Future of Work Report. Soon thereafter, SAP implemented meeting-free Fridays while Salesforce adopted a meeting-free week, explaining, [Laker’s] “recent article in Harvard Business Review noted the need to change how we work.”

== Selected publications ==
=== Key academic work ===
- Bolade-Ogunfodun, Y., Soga, L. R. and Laker, B. (2022) Entwined positionality and interpretive frames of reference: an autoethnographic account. Organizational Research Methods. ISSN 1552-7425 doi: https://doi.org/10.1177/10944281221111401
- Malik, A., Budhwar, P., Patel, C. and Laker, B. (2021) Holistic indigenous and atomistic modernity: analysing performance management in two Indian emerging market MNCs. Human Resource Management. ISSN 1099-050X doi: https://doi.org/10.1002/hrm.22057
- Hill, A., Cuthbertson, R., Brown, S. and Laker, B. (2017) Service fitness ladders: improving business performance in low cost or differentiated markets. International Journal of Operations & Production Management, 37 (10). pp. 1266-1303. ISSN 0144-3577 doi: https://doi.org/10.1108/IJOPM-03-2016-0142
- Mohri, S., Asgari, N., Farahini, R. Z., Bourlakis, M. and Laker, B. (2020) Fairness in hazmat routing-scheduling: a bi-objective Stackelberg game. Transportation Research Part E: Logistics and Transportation Review, 140. 102006. ISSN 1366-5545 doi: https://doi.org/10.1016/j.tre.2020.102006
- Huang, X., Wang, X., Han, L. and Laker, B. (2022) Does sound lending infrastructure foster better financial reporting quality of SMEs? European Journal of Finance. ISSN 1466-4364 doi: https://doi.org/10.1080/1351847X.2022.2075281

=== Key practitioner work ===
- Laker, B., Pereira, V., Malik, A. and Soga, L. (2022) Dear Manager, you’re holding too many meetings. Harvard Business Review. ISSN 0017-8012
- Laker, B., Pereira, V., Budhwar, P. and Malik, A. (2022) The surprising impact of meeting-free days. MIT Sloan Management Review. ISSN 1532-9194
- Laker, B. (2022) What does the four-day workweek mean for the future of work? MIT Sloan Management Review. ISSN 1532-9194
- Laker, B. (2021) Why companies should adopt a hub-and-spoke work model post-pandemic. MIT Sloan Management Review. ISSN 1532-9194
- Laker, B. and Roulet, T. (2019) How companies can adapt during times of political uncertainty. Harvard Business Review. ISSN 0017-8012
- Laker, B. and Roulet, T. (2019) Will the 4-Day workweek take hold in Europe? Harvard Business Review. ISSN 0017-8012
- Hill, A., Mellon, L., Laker, B. and Goddard, J. (2017) Research: how the best school leaders create enduring change. Harvard Business Review. ISSN 0017-8012
- Hill, A., Mellon, L., Laker, B. and Goddard, J. (2016) The one type of leader who can turn around a failing school. Harvard Business Review. ISSN 0017-8012
- Hill, A., Mellon, L., Goddard, J. and Laker, B. (2016) How to turn around a failing school. Harvard Business Review. ISSN 0017-8012
- Ben Laker; The benefits and risks of rehiring a boomerang employee, MIT Sloan Management Review. ISSN 1532-9194.
