= Knight-Hennessy Scholars =

Scholars program at Stanford University

- Established: 2016
- Affiliations: Stanford University
- Director: John L. Hennessy
- Students: Up to 100 each year
- Location: Stanford, California, US
- Website: knight-hennessy.stanford.edu

Knight-Hennessy Scholars is a graduate-level scholarship program for study at Stanford University. Established in 2016, the program was founded with the aim of preparing students to address complex global issues. Scholars receive funding support to pursue any graduate degree at Stanford.

Knight-Hennessy Scholars was founded in 2016 with a $400 million pledge from Phil Knight, the co-founder of Nike and a Stanford alum. Knight’s donation, which was one of the largest ever made to an American university at the time, was combined with $350 million in additional gifts from other Stanford alumni. Named for Knight and John Hennessy, Stanford’s 10th president, the program was founded to prepare graduate students to address global issues like climate change and poverty.

Scholars receive full funding to pursue any graduate degree at Stanford and participate in additional opportunities for leadership training, mentorship, and experiential learning across multiple disciplines. Knight-Hennessy is the largest fully-endowed university-wide graduate fellowship program in the world.

The program enrolled its first cohort of 51 graduate students in 2018, with participating students hailing from 21 countries and pursuing 31 different degree programs. A cohort of new Knight-Hennessy Scholars has been selected in each subsequent year. Notable alumni of the program include Alma Cooper, Andrew Leon Hanna, Paige Madden, Aya Mouallem, and Maike van Niekerk.

== Program ==
Knight-Hennessy Scholars supports scholars with coaching, funding and mentors, and provides workshops to help them develop their ideas to address important regional or global issues. The program's Global Impact Fund also offers one-time grants of up to $100,000 to scholars who have demonstrated a compelling commitment to the greater good by launching a nonprofit designed to improve lives and drive meaningful change.

The program provides financial support comprising full tuition and fees, living and academic expenses (such as room and board, books, academic supplies, instructional materials, local transportation, and reasonable personal expenses), a travel stipend, a relocation stipend, and health insurance.

The McMurtry Leadership Lecture program, which invites a prominent speaker to address Knight-Hennessy Scholars once per quarter, is a key component of the scholarship's programming. McMurtry lecturers have included philanthropist Melinda Gates, journalist and historian Isabel Wilkerson, economist Raj Chetty, Nobel Prize winning chemist Frances Arnold, former U.S. Secretary of State, Treasury, and Labor George Schultz, astronaut and engineer Ellen Ochoa, former California Supreme Court Justice and Carnegie Endowment for International Peace president Mariano-Florentino Cuéllar, speculative fiction novelist Neal Stephenson, and other prominent leaders from a wide range of disciplines.

== Selection ==
Potential applicants are required to apply to the Knight-Hennessy scholars program and, separately, to a Stanford University graduate degree program; those accepted receive three years of funding to study at one of Stanford’s seven schools.

The program provides students with up to three years of financial support to cover tuition, housing, and a stipend for living expenses.

While the plurality of Scholars are from the United States, Knight-Hennessy Scholars hail from across the world, and approximately half of each cohort holds a non-U.S. passport. Between the 2018 and 2026 cohort, Knight-Hennessy Scholars have enrolled from the following home countries (numbers approximated, as migrations and dual citizenships could affect the totals):

Home Country	Number of Scholars
Afghanistan	3
Argentina	4
Armenia	1
Australia	5
Austria	1
Belarus	1
Bolivia	1
Bosnia and Herzegovina	1
Brazil	5
Cambodia	1
Cameroon	1
Canada	24
Chile	4
China	14
Colombia	5
Croatia	1
Egypt	1
Ethiopia	4
Finland	1
France	2
Germany	5
Ghana	2
Haiti	1
Hong Kong	3
India	17
Indonesia	2
Iran	1
Iraq	1
Ireland	2
Israel	16
Italy	1
Jamaica	1
Japan	2
Kazakhstan	1
Kenya	5
Kosovo	1
Kyrgyzstan	1
Lebanon	3
Libya	1
Malawi	1
Malaysia	4
Mexico	7
Mongolia	1
Morocco	1
Myanmar	1
Nepal	1
New Zealand	1
Nigeria	8
North Macedonia	1
Pakistan	5
Peru	6
Philippines	3
Poland	1
Romania	1
Saudi Arabia	1
Sierra Leone	1
Singapore	4
South Africa	1
South Korea	11
Spain	2
Sri Lanka	1
Switzerland	1
Syria	2
Taiwan	4
Tajikistan	1
Tanzania	1
Togo	2
Tunisia	1
Turkey	2
Ukraine	4
United Arab Emirates	1
United Kingdom	15
United States	435
Uzbekistan	1
Vietnam	2
Zimbabwe	3
Total Scholars	684

== Denning House ==
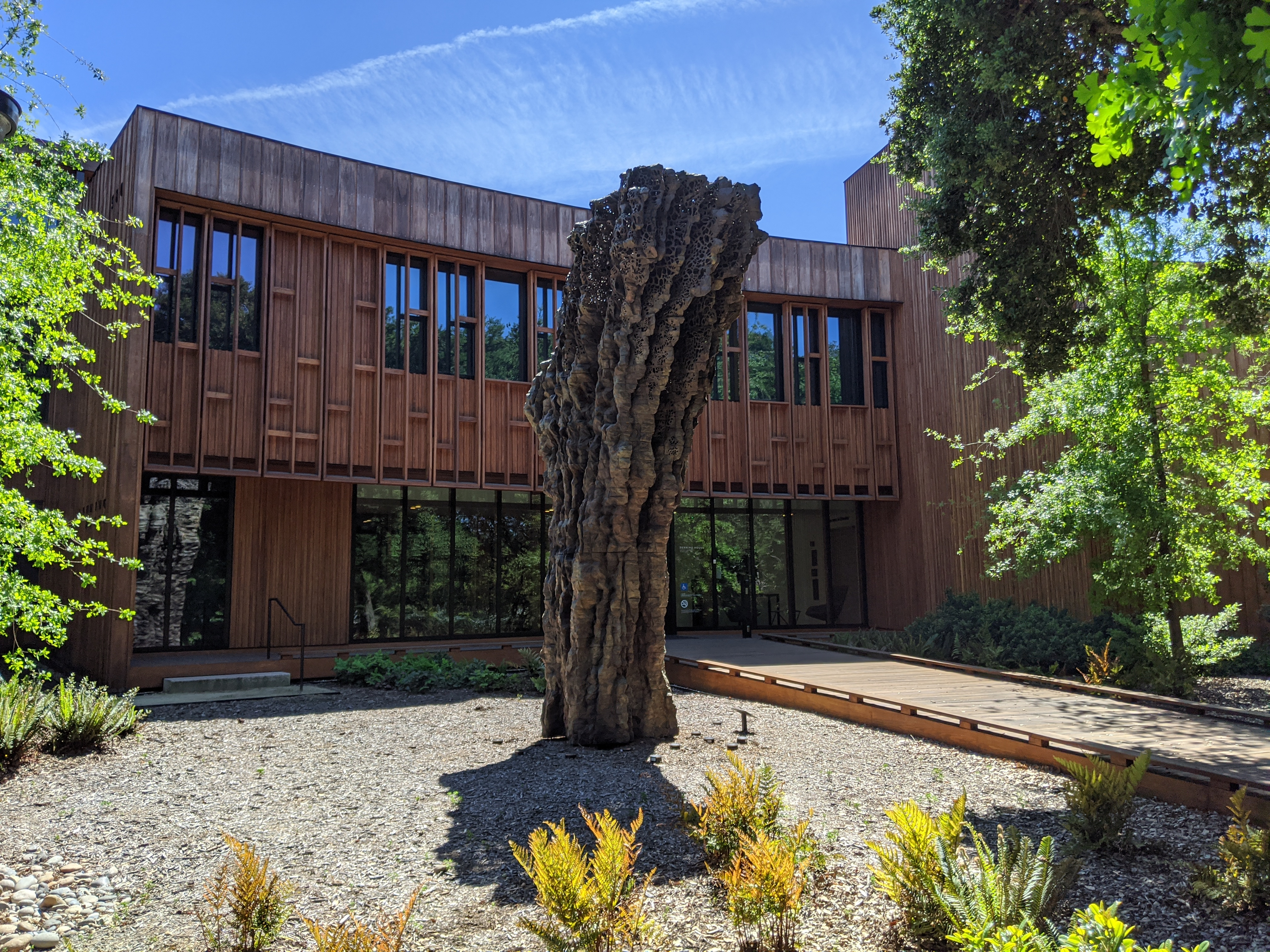
Denning House

In 2018, Denning House on the Stanford campus became the headquarters of the Knight-Hennessy Scholars. The Denning House was designed and constructed to house the program.

The New York architectural firm Ennead designed the two-story building, which has classrooms, a dining area, meeting and lecture rooms, as well as office space for a fellow-in-residence and for the program's administrative staff. The building was a gift from Steven A. Denning and his wife, Roberta Bowman Denning.

== See also ==
- Gates Cambridge Scholarship
- Marshall Scholarship
- Rhodes Scholarship
- Schwarzman Scholars
