= Fifty Million Rising =

2018 economics book by Saadia Zahidi

Fifty Million Rising: The New Generation of Working Women Transforming the Muslim World is a 2018 nonfiction book by Saadia Zahidi. Its title refers to the number of Muslim women who entered the global workforce between 2000 and 2015.
