= Scott Hartley =

American venture capitalist and author

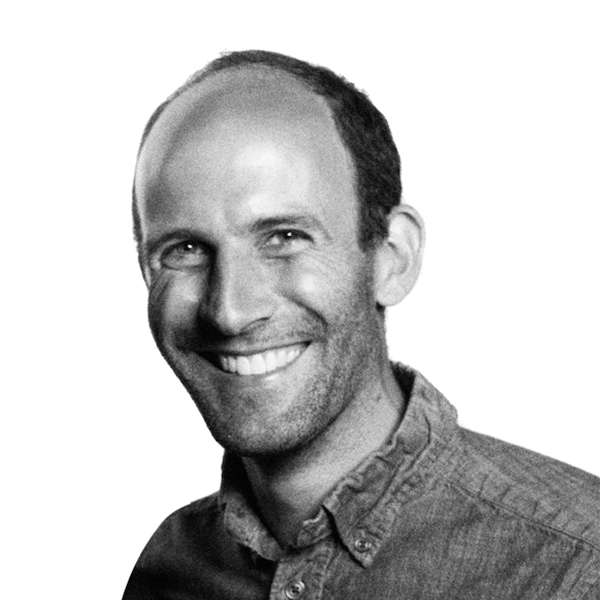
- Born: July 18, 1983 (age 43); Richland, Washington
- Education: Master of Business Administration
- Alma mater: Stanford University; Columbia University
- Occupations: Venture capitalist; author
- Notable work: Two Culture Capital (founder); Everywhere Ventures (co-founder and Managing Partner)
- Website: scotthartley.com

Scott Hartley (born July 18, 1983) is a venture capitalist and an author. He previously worked for Silicon Valley technology companies such as Google and Facebook as well as Harvard's Berkman Klein Center for Internet and Society. He was a Presidential Innovation Fellow at the White House and a partner at Mohr Davidow Ventures, a firm on Sand Hill Road.

== Early life and education ==
Hartley was born in Richland, Washington, but soon moved to Highlands Ranch, Colorado. His family moved to Palo Alto, California in 1993, where he attended Palo Alto High School. He was a student of Esther Wojcicki. Hartley already completed his second year at the University of Virginia (where he was an Eccles Scholar) when he decided to transfer to Stanford University, seeking classmates with a broader Liberal Arts perspective. In 2005, he finished his BA in Political Science at Stanford and later obtained an MBA at Columbia University Business School and an MIA in International Economic Policy at Columbia University School of International and Public Affairs. He is a term member at the Council on Foreign Relations.

== Career ==
After finishing his BA at Stanford, Hartley started working for Google. He lectured for Google.org and TechnoServe across East Africa. He also spent a year in India setting up the Google India team before moving to Facebook. He left the social media company to become a startup investor.

Hartley has attracted attention for his position that technology is not the only discipline necessary at Silicon Valley. He noted that, although technology is uniform in the technology field, there are many CEOs and startup founders who have backgrounds in humanities, liberal arts, and social sciences. In an interview, he stated that these leaders, based on their performance over time, have the ability to take a step back, ask the right questions, and, empathize with the customer, making them more effective than a leader who merely has technological fluency.

In his book, The Fuzzy and The Techie: Why the Liberal Arts Will Rule the Digital World, Hartley also argued that the business world depends on human touch that soft skills bring despite the increasing role technology plays in running business organizations. His book has been translated into six languages and was listed among top ten business books in Spain, 2021. According to him, technology and the liberals arts cannot be studied in isolation from each other. He spoke about his book at the World Bank annual meeting, USGIF's GEOINT Symposium, Google, IBM, Stanford University with Marissa Mayer, University of Washington, University of Arizona and Arkansas State University. The book was also selected as a book of the month by the Financial Times and was a finalist for the FT and McKinsey & Company's Bracken Bower Prize. His book has been mentioned by Fareed Zakaria during commencement speech at Bucknell University. He maintained that liberal arts degrees are crucial in applying emerging technologies to the creation of breakthrough innovations. Hartley also criticized fellow venture capitalists such as Marc Andreessen, who previously declared that the average graduate with a degree in English ends up "working in a shoe store”. He pushed back against Andreesen's position that a liberal arts education limits the dimensionality of one's thinking since it makes students less familiar with mathematical models and statistics. Hartley said that those with backgrounds in these fields "will develop ethics in artificial intelligence, question bias in algorithms and data and will bring contextual understanding to code.”

He is also a contributing writer to a number of publications, including the Financial Times, Forbes, and Foreign Policy. Hartley is the founder of a venture capital firm, Two Culture Capital.

He is also co-founder and managing partner of Everywhere Ventures which is an early-stage venture firm formerly known as, The Fund. The firm was founded in 2018 with $3.5 million in initial capital but later rebranded as Everywhere Ventures upon raising its second fund of $25 million. As of 2023, it had backed more than 250 startups across the U.S., Europe, Latin America, Australia, Asia, and Africa. Some of the notable investments by the firm include AscendArc, a Portland-based small geostationary satellite company that raised $4 million in seed funding in January 2025 and secured a contract with the United States Air Force, and Starcloud, an orbital data center startup whose first satellite, carrying an Nvidia H100 GPU, launched in October 2024. In March 2026, Starcloud raised $170 million in a Series A round led by Benchmark and EQT Ventures at a $1.1 billion valuation, becoming the fastest unicorn in Y Combinator history.

Hartley has written about the implications of artificial intelligence for the future of work. He has described a framework for AI adoption that distinguishes between organizations that use AI to increase output which he calls "Strong" and those that use it primarily to reduce costs while maintaining existing output calling them "Skinny". He has also argued that humans retain advantages over machines in posing broader questions and applying contextual judgment.

== Personal life ==
Hartley lives in Brooklyn, New York.
