= Bracken Bower Prize =

Financial Times Bracken Prize
- Awarded for: Best business book proposal by an author under 35
- Sponsored by: Financial Times; McKinsey & Company
- Location: London / New York
- Reward: £15,000
- First award: 2014

The Bracken Prize (formerly the Financial Times and McKinsey Bracken Bower Prize) is an annual award given to the best business book proposal of the year by a young writer, as determined by the Financial Times and McKinsey & Company. It aims to find the "best proposal for a book about the challenges and opportunities of growth by an author aged under 35".

Established in 2014, the prize was named after Brendan Bracken, chairman of the Financial Times from 1945 to 1958, and Marvin Bower, managing director of McKinsey from 1950 to 1967. The prize is worth £15,000 and is presented at the same time as the Financial Times and McKinsey Business Book of the Year Award.

Several previous winners and finalists of the contest have landed book deals with major publishers. Siddarth Shrikanth, finalist for the 2020 prize, secured publishing deals with Duckworth Books and Penguin Random House for his book, The Case for Nature. Winner of the 2019 Prize, Jonathan Hillman had his book on China's global infrastructure expansion, The Digital Silk Road: China's Quest to Wire the World and Win the Future, published by Harper Business. Cambridge University Press published the book by 2018 Prize Winner Andrew Leon Hanna, 25 Million Sparks: The Untold Story of Refugee Entrepreneurs, which tells the story of three Syrian women entrepreneurs in the Za'atari refugee camp and of refugee entrepreneurs around the world. From the same cohort, finalist Christian Busch had his book, published as The Serendipity Mindset: The Art and Science of Creating Good Luck, released by Riverhead Books.

From the 2016 cohort, Kogan Page published Blockchain Babel: The Crypto Craze and the Challenge to Business by finalist Igor Pejic. Houghton Mifflin Harcourt published venture capitalist and Bracken Bower finalist Scott Hartley's book, The Fuzzy and the Techie: Why the Liberal Arts Will Rule the Digital World, a Financial Times Business Book of the Month that was mentioned on the longlist for the FT/McKinsey Business Book of the Year Award in 2017. Published in paperback by Mariner Books, it has been acquired by Penguin Random House in India, and translated into Portuguese and Korean.

Among the 2015 cohort, Penguin Press agreed to publish Meltdown: Why Our Systems Fail and What We Can Do About It, a book about the changing nature of failure in business and life, by 2015 Prize Winners and former derivates trader Christopher Clearfield and University of Toronto professor András Tilcsik. Meltdown won Canada's National Business Book Award in 2019. Irene Yuan Sun's short-listed proposal for a book about China's economic role in Africa was picked up by Harvard Business Review Press.

The prize also led to a publishing deal for Saadia Zahidi, the first-ever Bracken Bower Prize winner in 2014; Nation Books acquired a book based on her proposal, Womenomics in the Muslim World, in 2015, and it was retitled Fifty Million Rising: The New Generation of Working Women Transforming the Muslim World.

In 2023, the Financial Times announced that the Bracken Prize would not take place that year, rather, it would host a celebration of paster winners and entrants. In 2024, Financial Times announced that the Bracken Prize would again not be taking place and that it was attempting to secure resources for a return of the prize.

== Winners and shortlist ==
Blue Ribbon = winner | Finalists (F) | Shortlist (S)

2014

- Saadia Zahidi, Womenomics in the Muslim World, published as Fifty Million Rising: The New Generation of Working Women Transforming the Muslim World (Bold Type Books, 2018)
- (F) Alysia Garmulewicz, 3-D Printing, Anything, Anywhere
- (F) Jenny Palmer, One Level Up

2015

- Christopher Clearfield & András Tilcsik, Rethinking the Unthinkable, published as Meltdown: Why Our Systems Fail and What We Can Do About It (Penguin Press, 2018)
- (F) Jonathan Hillman, The Fog of More
- (F) Irene Yuan Sun, Brave Old World: Why China's Investments in Africa Should Make Us Rethink Economic Development (Harvard Business Press, 2017)
- (S) Edoardo Campanella
- (S) Sangu Delle
- (S) Cerys Hearsey
- (S) Chizoba Nnaemeka
- (S) Thomas Roulet, The Power of Being Divisive: Understanding Negative Social Evaluations (Stanford University Press, 2020)
- (S) Ryan Shaw
- (S) David Skarbek
- (S) Alexander Webb

2016

- Nora Rosendahl, Mental Meltdown
- (F) Igor Pejic, Blockchain Babel: The Crypto Craze and the Challenge to Business (Kogan Page, 2019)
- (F) Scott Hartley, The Fuzzy and the Techie: Why the Liberal Arts Will Rule the Digital World (Houghton Mifflin Harcourt, 2017)
- (S) Sophie Dickins
- (S) Simon Hedlin
- (S) Gavin McLoughlin
- (S) Ross Murdoch
- (S) Pavan Soni
- (S) Alexander Webb

2017

- Mehran Gul, The New Geography of Innovation
- (F) Michael Motala, The Peer-to-Peer Social Contract
- (F) Alexandre Lazarow, Startup Heretic
- (S) Christian Busch
- (S) Wendy Bradley
- (S) Walter Frick
- (S) Geoffrey Gertz
- (S) Alexander Goemans
- (S) Jonathan Hillman
- (S) Maja Korica
- (S) Anika Nagpal & Nina Vasan

2018

- Andrew Leon Hanna, 25 Million Sparks: The Untold Story of Refugee Entrepreneurs (Cambridge University Press, 2022)
- (F) Christian Busch The Serendipity Mindset: The Art and Science of Creating Good Luck (Riverhead Books, 2020)
- (F) Piyumi Kapugeekiyana, One Billion in Reserve
- (S) Maneet Ahuja
- (S) David Buckmaster, Fair Pay: How to Get a Raise, Close the Wage Gap, and Build Stronger Businesses (Harper Business, 2021)
- (S) Owen W. Cameron
- (S) Neil Doig
- (S) Muris Hadzic
- (S) Edoardo Maggini
- (S) Michelle Meagher
- (S) Joel Modestus & Sreevas Sahasranamam
- (S) Colette van der Ven

2019

- Jonathan Hillman, The Digital Silk Road: China's Quest to Wire the World and Win the Future (Harper Business, 2021)
- (F) Paulo Savaget
- (F) Ernesto Zaldivar
- (S) Alonso de Gortari
- (S) Maram Ahmed
- (S) Yaman Kaakeh
- (S) Vardhan Kapoor
- (S) Salil Motianey
- (S) Katya Peremanova
- (S) Thomas Roulet
- (S) Siling Tan

2020

- Stephen Boyle, New Money
- (F) Rola Kaakeh, Waiting on Medicines: Our Reliance on Medications to Shape our Future
- (F) Siddarth Shrikanth, Money Trees: Making the Business Case for Nature
- (S) Sophie Campbell
- (S) Portia Crowe
- (S) Sean Henry Drake
- (S) Laura Fedoruk
- (S) Anas Kaakeh
- (S) Babatunde Onabajo
- (S) Beniamino Pagliaro
- (S) John Soroushian
- (S) Sughra Shah Bukhari
- (S) Alexander Webb

2021

- Ines Lee & Eileen Tipoe, Failing the Class
- (F) Manuel Hepfer, The Cybersecurity Wake-Up Call
- (F) Melissa Zhang, Trailblazers
- (S) Lucy Christie
- (S) Sri Muppidi
- (S) Joanna Socha
- (S) Richard Hudson
- (S) Vardhan Kapoor
- (S) Joel Modestus
- (S) Ben Payton
- (S) Jonathan Pierre
- (S) Joe Sullivan
- (S) Aaron Taylor
- (S) Benjamin Tur

2022

- Âriel de Fauconberg, Before the Dawn
- (F) Victoria Berquist, The Unstoppable Rise of Private Capital in Public Health
- (F) Julia Marisa Sekula, Owning the Centre
- (S) Otilia Barbuta
- (S) James da Costa
- (S) Will Hall-Smith
- (S) Patrick Hinton
- (S) Anas Kaakeh
- (S) David Maggs
- (S) Salil Motianey
- (S) Drake Pooley
