= Aya Mouallem =

Lebanese electrical engineer, researcher, Knight-Hennessy Scholar

- Born: 17 January 1998; 28 years ago Hamra, Beirut
- Education: BS in Computer and Communications Engineering at the American University of Beirut; MS / Ph.D. in Electrical Engineering at Stanford University
- Occupation: Co-Founder of "All Girls Code"

Aya Mouallem (Arabic: آية المعلّم; born January 17, 1998) is a Lebanese electrical engineer, researcher, and a Knight-Hennessy Scholar at Stanford University. She is the co-founder, co-director, and current board advisory member of All Girls Code, a volunteer-led initiative to provide Lebanese female youth with coding experience. Mouallem is active in the field of Arab youth women empowerment in STEM.

== Early life and education ==
Aya Mouallem was born on January 17, 1998, in Beirut, Lebanon. She attended high school at Beirut Baptist School from 2013 to 2016. Mouallem graduated from the American University of Beirut (AUB) in 2020 holding a BEng degree in Computer and Communications Engineering and an undeclared minor in English Language and Literature. She received the prestigious Penrose Award upon graduation, which is awarded to an outstanding undergraduate in Maroun Semaan Faculty of Engineering and Architecture at AUB on the basis of scholarship, character, leadership, and contribution to university life. She is currently a Knight-Hennessy Scholar at Stanford University pursuing an MS/Ph.D. in Electrical and Electronics Engineering, and her research focuses on increasing the accessibility of engineering education to learners with disabilities.

== Outreach and volunteer efforts ==
=== All Girls Code ===
Mouallem co-founded and served as co-director of All Girls Code, a non-profit, community-based initiative that aims to provide Lebanese female youth with coding experience and hands-on experience in STEM. All Girls Code offers several hands-on, immersive technology programs and a year-round mentorship program, and it is fully volunteer-led. 90% of All Girls Code alumni have gone on to pursue a degree in STEM.

Mouallem stated that she was motivated to found All Girls Code after noticing that women were discouraged from pursuing careers in STEM; instead, they pursued careers that are not traditionally dominated by men. Mouallem also cited other personal experiences and gave an example about the lack of gender diversity at a software lab at her university.

=== Beirut Port Explosion ===
After the Beirut Port Explosion, Mouallem stated to Forbes that government efforts to locate missing survivors and victims were extremely slow. Thus, she joined, structured, and grew the Locate Victims Beirut team that built a database to locate the dead and missing. She has since left the team.

=== Additional advocacy and volunteering efforts ===
Mouallem was on the organizing team of the inaugural MIT Lebanon Challenge which was held in 2020 and attracted more than 1,000 applicants from all over the world who formed teams, came up with innovative solutions to Lebanon's most pressing problems, and pitched their ideas to Lebanese ministers and CEOs. Mouallem and her team fully created the participants' experience and resources, and they reviewed all the admission applications. In addition, Mouallem was an ambassador of Stanford's She++ between 2017 and 2018 to the Middle East. In June 2018, Mouallem was chosen as one of Johnson & Johnson's 10 Devex fellows, representing the Middle East, so she attended the Devex World conference and stated in an interview that she will always be working toward helping youth women in the Middle East to pursue and navigate STEM fields. She was also selected as a fellow by Women Deliver, which is an organization that promotes gender equality and women's rights and supports future women leaders. Mouallem was announced as a Gender Innovation Agora (GIA) fellow by the UN Women Regional Office for the Arab States to work on projects related to women in the information and communications technology fields in the Arab World. In 2021, Aya was featured by the New York Times as one of ten women transforming the landscape of leadership worldwide for her advocacy work in the Middle East. She was also featured by Cosmopolitan Middle East in their Generation STEM issue in the same year. Mouallem was a board member of Girls Teaching Girls to Code during the summer of 2021 in the Bay Area. Currently, Mouallem is serving on the Women in Tech committee and the board of LebNet as the youngest member. LebNet is a non-profit organization that aims to bring together technologists of Lebanese descent together in the field of tech. She was also featured in a campaign by the UNESCO and the Issam Fares Institute at AUB as a pioneer in STEM in the Middle East and North Africa. Mouallem has moderated and led conversations with Melinda French Gates and Malala Yousafzai on gender equality and girls' education.

== Awards and recognition ==
Mouallem has received multiple academic and leadership awards during her high school and undergraduate studies, including the Penrose Award and the Baassiri Exceptional Volunteer of the Year Award at AUB. She also received The Diana Award in 2019, in memory of Princess Diana, for her philanthropic efforts with youth in the Middle East. Mouallem was selected a 2020 Knight-Hennessy Scholar at Stanford University with an acceptance rate of 1.2%. The prestigious scholarship, founded by John Hennessy and Phil Knight, cultivates and supports a multidisciplinary and multicultural community of graduate students from across Stanford University, and delivers engaging experiences that prepare graduates to be visionary, courageous, and collaborative leaders who address complex challenges facing the world and prepare for leadership positions in corporations, non-profits, and governments. In 2022, Mouallem was shortlisted to the Arab Women Awards Next Gen list.

== Bibliography ==
1. Aya Mouallem, as told to Kaitlin Ahern. "How the Founder of All Girls Code Is Shaking up Stem in the Middle East." Content Lab U.S., Johnson & Johnson, 12 June 2018
2. Aya Mouallem, as told to Kaitlin Ahern. "How the Founder of All Girls Code Is Shaking up STEM in the Middle East." Johnson & Johnson, 12 June 2018, www.jnj.com/personal-stories/the-road-to-devex-aya-mouallem-discusses-her-stem-program-for-girls. Accessed 3 Apr. 2022.
3. Bennett, Jessica. "10 Women Changing the Landscape of Leadership." New York Times, https://www.nytimes.com/live/2021/03/05/world/women-leadership
4. "Devex World 2018." Devex World 2018, 2018, pages.devex.com/devex-world-2018-fellows.html. Accessed 3 Apr. 2022.
5. "Meet the Team." MIT Lebanon Challenge, https://lebanonchallenge.mit.edu/?page_id=466.
6. Stanford 125. "Girls Teaching Girls to Code." Stanford 125, 14 Dec. 2016, 125.stanford.edu/girls-teaching-girls-code/.
7. "UN Women Announces New Cohort of Youth Advocates." UN Women Arab States, 21 Dec. 2020, arabstates.unwomen.org/en/news/stories/2020/12/un-women-announces-new-cohort-of-youth-advocates.
8. "Up Close and Personal with WiT Outreach Program Lead Aya Mouallem ." LebNet, https://lebnet.us/profiles/12624520.
