= Siebel Scholars =

Charitable foundation

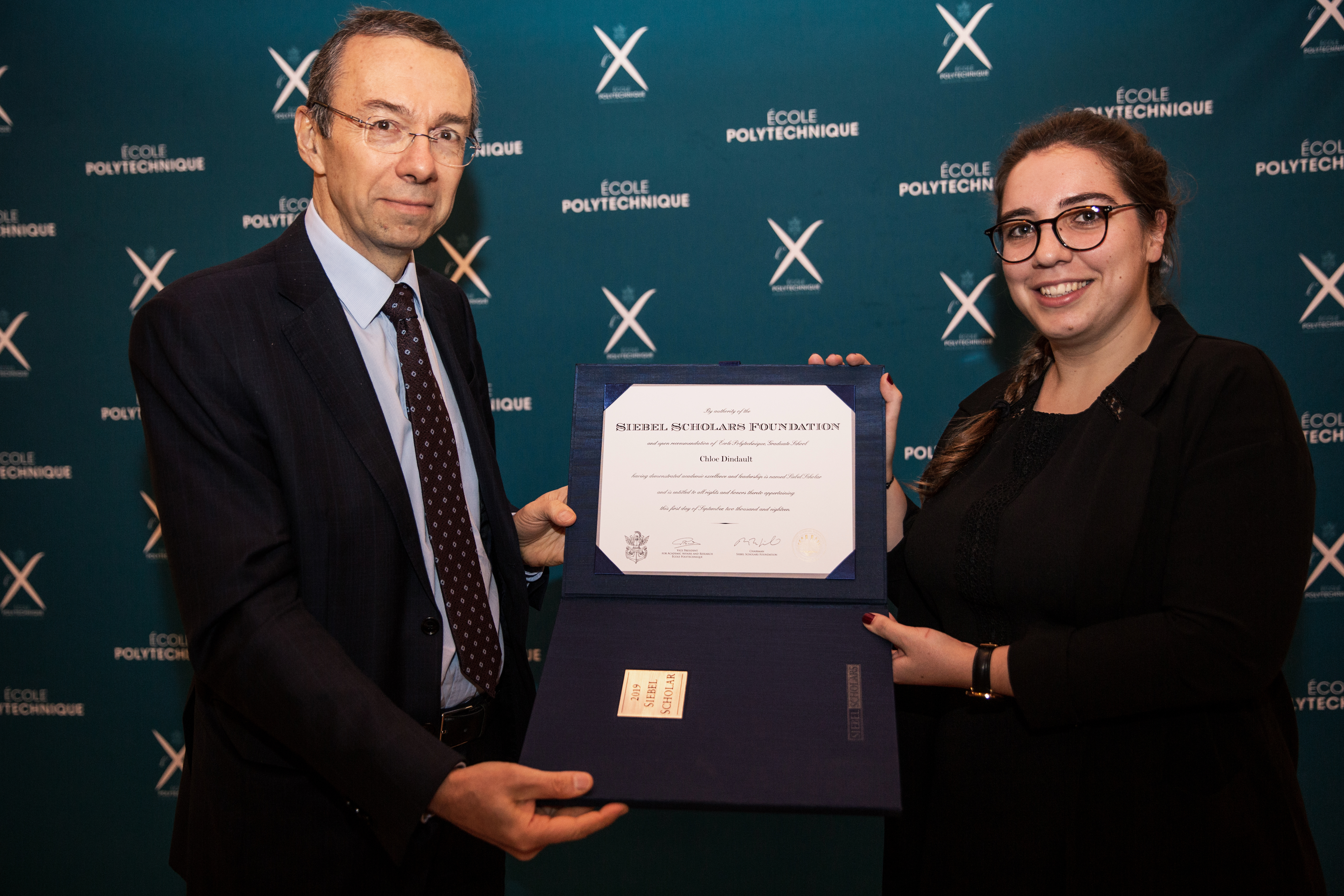
- Éric Labaye presenting the award to Chloé Dindault (École Polytechnique in 2018.
- Formation: April 4, 2000; 26 years ago

The Siebel Scholars program was established by the Thomas and Stacey Siebel Foundation in 2000 to recognize the most talented students at graduate schools of business, computer science, bioengineering, and energy science in the United States, China, France, Italy, and Japan.

== Description ==
The Siebel Scholars program was originally established with grants totaling more than $45 million. The scholar selection process varies from school to school. According to one report, "On average, Siebel Scholars rank in the top 5 percent of their class, and many within the top 1 percent."

According to Mark Snir, head of the Computer Science department at UI Urbana-Champaign, Siebel was able to "...through his Siebel Scholars program he [Thomas Siebel] allows some of the most talented students in computer science and business at Illinois and other major universities to address society's most pressing issues, such as stem-cell research."

The Siebel Energy Institute also created a partnership with the Siebel Scholars Foundation, expanding the program to include outstanding leaders in the field of energy science at its universities. Siebel Scholars are key advisors to the Siebel Foundation, guiding the development of innovative programs the foundation initiates. The annual Siebel Scholars conference and ongoing planning sessions throughout the year are an integral part of the Siebel Scholars program.

The role of Seibel Scholars was described in 2016:

We have over 1,000 Siebel Scholars today. They're very, very accomplished. It's fun to be able to associate with them and hold our scholars conference. I just though it would be very interesting to develop a global community of people who are highly connected who were exceptionally bright and accomplished. We bring together a multiplicity of disciplines there – in engineering, in computer science, bioengineering, business, environmental science. ... We wrestle with challenging topics and we have a lot of fun.

— Thoamas Siebel

== History ==
Siebel Systems, Inc., established the Siebel Scholars program in April 2000, to fund awards for fifty-five graduate students in business and computer science at eleven institutions of higher learning. Annually, five students named by each institution received $25,000 to defray their second-year educational costs. Thomas M. Siebel, chairman and CEO of Siebel Systems, said "Siebel Systems wishes to support those efforts on a personal level, and the Siebel Scholars Program is our way of helping develop the talent." Siebel Scholars Foundation trademarked SIEBEL SCHOLARS, listing as goods and services: "Arranging and conducting educational conferences concerning political, academic, business, climate, and energy issues for Siebel Scholars with leading experts on global issues." The Foundation also supported "an alumni association of all Siebel Scholars...(to) convene at a conference to be hosted annually by one of the participating schools".

The Siebel Scholars Program was originally established at eleven programs: Carnegie Mellon School of Computer Science; MIT School of Engineering and MIT Sloan School of Management; Stanford University School of Engineering and Stanford Graduate School of Business; UC Berkeley College of Engineering; University of Illinois at Urbana-Champaign College of Engineering; Harvard Business School; J.L. Kellogg School of Management of Northwestern University; University of Chicago Graduate School of Business; and The Wharton School of the University of Pennsylvania.

In December 2000, Siebel Systems, Inc., named Kip A. Frey, who formerly led OpenSite Technologies, to lead the Siebel Scholars program, with annual funding of $1.375 million a year in scholarships. By 2012, each Siebel Scholar received a $35,000 award for a final year of graduate studies.

In 2014, the budget for the Siebel Scholar program was $40 million annually.

== Participating Schools ==
=== Graduate Schools of Business ===
- Massachusetts Institute of Technology (Sloan School of Management)
- Northwestern University (Kellogg School of Management)
- Stanford University (Stanford Graduate School of Business)
- University of Chicago (Booth School of Business)
- Harvard University (Harvard Business School)
- University of Pennsylvania (Wharton School of Business)

=== Graduate Schools of Computer Science ===
- Carnegie Mellon University
- Harvard University
- Massachusetts Institute of Technology
- Princeton University
- Stanford University
- Tsinghua University
- University of California, Berkeley
- University of Illinois at Urbana-Champaign
- University of Chicago

=== Graduate Schools of Bioengineering ===
- Johns Hopkins University, Whiting School of Engineering and Johns Hopkins School of Medicine
- Massachusetts Institute of Technology, MIT School of Engineering
- Stanford University, Stanford University School of Engineering and Stanford University School of Medicine
- University of California, Berkeley, UC Berkeley College of Engineering
- University of California, San Diego, Institute of Engineering in Medicine and Jacobs School of Engineering

=== Graduate Schools of Energy Science ===
- Carnegie Mellon University, Carnegie Mellon School of Computer Science
- École Polytechnique, Graduate School
- Massachusetts Institute of Technology, MIT School of Engineering
- Politecnico di Torino, Doctoral School
- Princeton University, Princeton University School of Engineering and Applied Science
- Stanford University, Stanford University School of Earth, Energy & Environmental Sciences
- Tsinghua University, Laboratory for Low Carbon Energy
- University of California, Berkeley, UC Berkeley College of Engineering
- University of Illinois at Urbana-Champaign, UIUC College of Engineering
- University of Tokyo, School of Engineering

== Annual Siebel Scholars Conference ==
A key element of the program is the annual Siebel Scholars Conference. Each year, current and past Scholars convene at the annual Conference. The Scholars gather with university faculty and thought leaders to discuss and debate global issues.

=== Conference topics and speakers ===
- 2000 Conference at University of Chicago - Global Security and Human Genome Project
  - Speakers: General Alexander Haig; Roger Cossack, Zbigniew Brzezinski, Robert M. Gates, John Major, Aristides A.N. Patrinos, Charles DeLisi
- 2001 Conference at MIT - Crisis Management and Global Terrorism
  - Speakers: Dr. Jerry Linenger, Kurt Muse, Norman Schwarzkopf, Denny Fitch, Benjamin Netanyahu, William Gavin, Scott O'Grady
- 2002 Conference at Stanford University - Stem Cell Research and The Role of the State in Regulating the Economy
  - Speakers: Alice M. Rivlin, Richard C. Breeden, Dr. Arthur Caplan, Robert Reich, Irving L. Weissman, William Kristol
- 2004 Conference at University of Illinois at Urbana-Champaign - A Discussion of Justice in America
  - Speakers: Ron Angelone, Craig Haney, Bernard B. Kerik, Nadine Strossen, Alan Elsner, Marc Mauer, William J. Fraser
- 2005 Conference at University of Chicago - The Methamphetamine Crisis in America
  - Speakers: Michael O. Leavitt, Barry R. McCaffrey, Mike McGrath, A. Thomas McLellan, David Murray, Bryan Samuels, Richard W. Sanders, S. Alex Stalcup, Eames Yates
- 2007 Conference at University of California, Berkeley - The Economics of Alternative Energy
  - Speakers: Spencer Abraham, Carol Browner, Myron Ebell, Daniel C. Esty, Ben Lieberman, Jon Meacham, Angus Rockett, Richard Swanson, Jerry Taylor
- 2008 Conference at Northwestern University - Water: The Next Global Crisis?
  - Speakers: Terry L. Anderson, Nigel Asquith, Maude Barlow, Joseph Dellapenna, Peter Gleick, Robert Glennon, Clay J. Landry, Lewis H. Lapham, Gary Libecap, Pat Mulroy, Rodney Smith, Kimberly Strassel, Barton H."Buzz" Thompson, Jr.
- 2010 Conference at Massachusetts Institute of Technology - Energy and Climate
  - Speakers: Doug Arent, Heidi Cullen, Thomas Friedman, Thomas Kalil, Doug May, Stephen W. Pacala, Arati Prabhakar, Andrew Revkin, Jim Rogers, Richard Sandor, Daniel P. Schrag, Stephen Stokes
- 2011 Conference at Janelia Farm Research Campus of the Howard Hughes Medical Institute - Synthetic Biology
  - Speakers: Frances Arnold, Arthur Caplan, Alta Charo, Greg Conko, Jay Keasling, Michael Krasny (talk show host), Ed Penhoet, Arti Rai, Vandana Shiva, Craig Venter
- 2012 Conference at University of California, Berkeley - Class Warfare in America
  - Speakers: David Brooks, Niall Ferguson, William Galston, Lewis H. Lapham, Charles Murray, Ralph Nader, Robert Reich, Condoleezza Rice
- 2017 Conference at National Academy of Sciences Building of the National Academy of Sciences - Energy Grid Cybersecurity: Threats and Solutions
  - Speakers: Robert Gates, Ted Koppel, Tim Conway, Robert M. Lee, Kevin Mandia, Liam Ó Murchú
- 2018 Conference at Stanford University - The Social Implications of AI
  - Speakers: Garry Kasparov, Alan S. Murray, Ajay Agrawal, Pedro Domingos, Deirdre Mulligan, Mark Nehmer, Naveen Rao, Max Tegmark
