= Thomas J. Roulet =

French-British professor

Thomas Roulet FAcSS
- Known for: negative social evaluations

Academic background
- Education: HEC Paris, Sciences Po, Audencia Business School

Academic work
- Discipline: organization theory, leadership
- Sub-discipline: institutional theory, stakeholder theory
- Institutions: University of Cambridge

Thomas J. Roulet FAcSS is a French-British social scientist, management thinker and professor at the University of Cambridge where he holds the Chair of Organisational Sociology and Leadership. He has advanced the concept of negative social evaluations and is known for his research on wellbeing in the context of remote work. He is a full professor at the Judge Business School, and a Fellow of King's College, Cambridge.

Roulet is a regular commentator on workplace issues, leadership and management education for a variety of media including the BBC, the Telegraph, the Financial Times, ITV News, Le Monde, The Washington Post or The Guardian among others. He writes a column on strategic leadership for Forbes.

In 2024, he was elected Fellow of the Academy of Social Sciences. In 2020, he was elected as one of the trustees and council members of the Society for the Advancement of Management Studies. He is also a Mid-Career Fellow of the British Academy and Fellow of the British Higher Education Academy. He serves as the co-director of the King's Entrepreneurship Lab at King's College Cambridge, which he co-founded in 2021.

== Academic career ==
Before becoming an academic, Roulet was an investment banker during the 2008 financial crisis, an experience that spurred a curiosity to study the culture of investment banks and how organizations react under public pressure. In 2017, in a documentary for Die Zeit, he discussed the experience of European academics who immigrated to the United Kingdom in the aftermath of Brexit.

He received his Master's in management at Audencia Nantes (France), MPhil in Economic Governance at Sciences Po and completed his PhD in management at HEC Paris. He was Chazen Visiting Scholar at Columbia University from 2011 to 2012. Previously, Roulet lectured at the University of Oxford (Pembroke College), the University of Bath, and at King's College London.

From 2017 to 2020, he was Co-Editor in chief of M@n@gement, which was founded as the first open-access and bilingual journal in the field of management and organization theory, a journal of the French Academy of Management and sponsored by the French National Centre for Scientific Research (CNRS).

== Research and academic work ==
Roulet pioneered work in the area of negative social evaluations, articulating phenomena at different levels of analysis such as social stigma, scandals, or negative reputation, in particular through his 2020 book, “The Power of Being Divisive: Understanding Negative Social Evaluations” (Stanford University Press) which was reviewed in Organization Studies and Administrative Science Quarterly. According to its review in the Financial Times, the book outlines the mechanism through which negative social evaluations can have positive implications. The Economist labelled it as a book about "stigma in business" and focused on the book's explanation of how employees of vilified companies are nonetheless proud of their employer. The book was shortlisted for the Financial Times and McKinsey Bracken Bower Prize, a runner up for the George Terry Award of the Academy of Management and the Axiom Medal.

In 2016, before the US election, Roulet predicted in an op-ed in the Telegraph that Trump would be elected, despite being underestimated by polls because his supporters were the subject of a “spiral of silence”. They felt like they were in the minority while being a majority, and thus their voices were not heard. In the Power of Being Divisive, he labels such political strategy as divisive leadership, a strategy aimed at polarizing opinion to build a strong support base.

In his work, he explains how the negative behaviors of the investment banking industry persisted during and after the 2008 financial crisis: in coverage by Matt Levine for Bloomberg and by the Economist, it is explained how Roulet showed the media reporting of banks’ misconduct signaled their proximity to the core values of their field and brought them more business.

This stream of work got him to study social movements' contestation strategies, from the Gilet Jaunes to the whisky industry. He also explored how apparently unpopular and counterintuitive ideas, such as degrowth, can anchor themselves in behaviors and be considered attractive even for capitalist firms.

With colleagues, Roulet also wrote a piece on covert participant observation – rehabilitating the method as an important tool to uncover social phenomena that have ethical implications.

Roulet is also known for his research on wellbeing and mental health, and how it is impacted by hyperflexibility, hybrid- and remote work.

Together with Kiran Bhatti, he coined the concept of "Wellbeing Intelligence" (mental health self-awareness and skills) in an article for the MIT Sloan Management Review and subsequently in an eponymous book.

== Honors ==
In 2024, he was elected Fellow of the Academy of Social Sciences, and named one of the Young Global Leaders of the World Economic Forum, and on the Thinkers50 Radar for emerging management thought leaders. In 2023, he was selected as a Mid-Career Fellow of the British Academy, and he received the Pilkington Prize for Teaching Excellence awarded annually by the University of Cambridge. In 2020, he was named "40 under 40 Best Business School professors” (Poet&Quants) and “MBA professors to look out for” (Business Because). In 2017, he was awarded the “Best paper in Organizational Research Methods” by the Academy of Management.
