= Pamela Meyer =

American author and entrepreneur

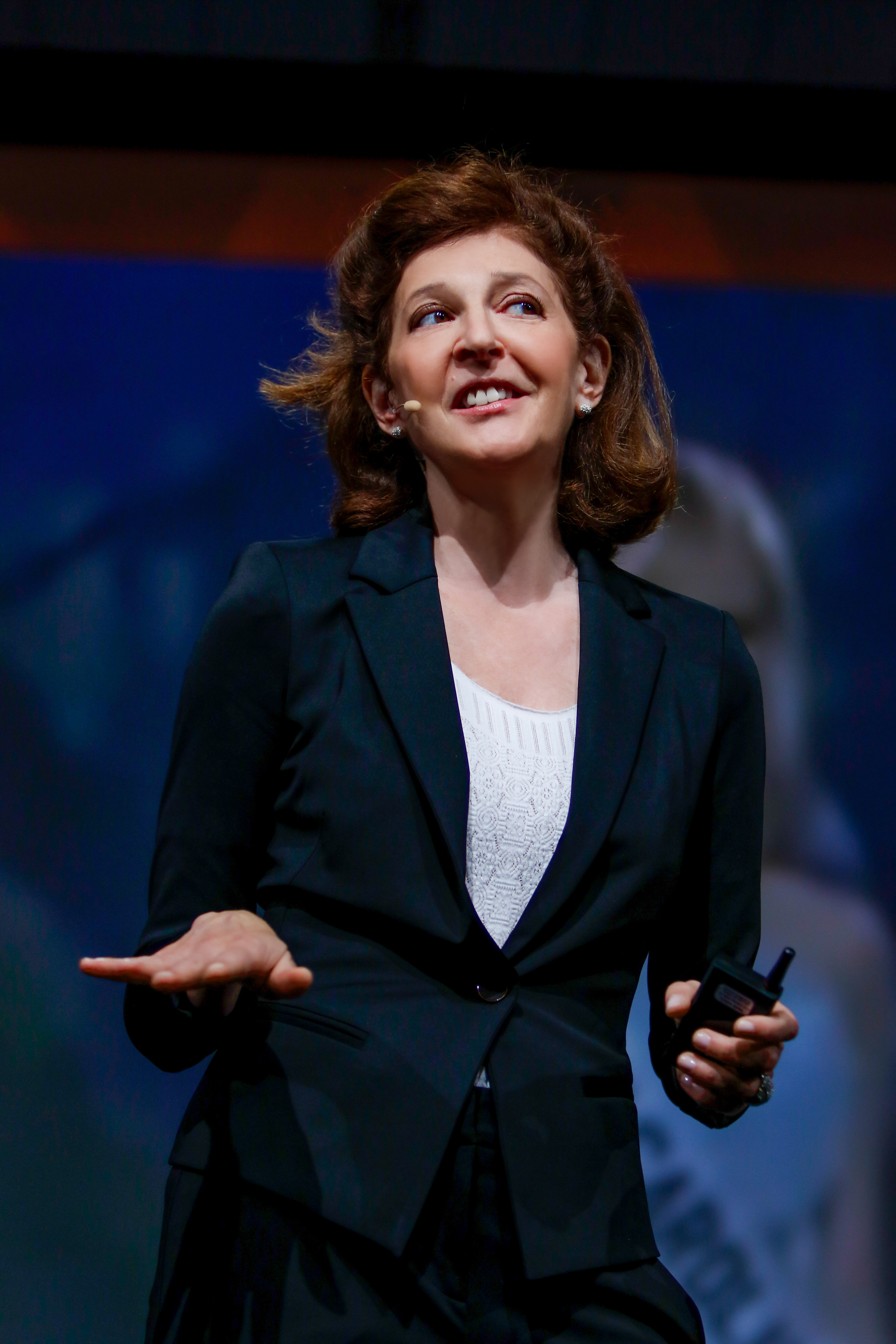
- Born: Washington, DC
- Education: Washington University in St. Louis; Harvard Business School; Claremont Graduate School
- Occupations: Author, entrepreneur
- Notable work: Liespotting: Proven Techniques to Detect Deception
- Spouse: Frederick Kempe
- Website: https://pamelameyer.com/

Pamela Meyer is an American author, certified fraud examiner, and entrepreneur. Described by Reader's Digest as "the nation's best known expert on lying," Meyer is the author of the 2010 book Liespotting: Proven Techniques to Detect Deception. Her 2011 TED talk, "How to Spot a Liar," has exceeded 31 million views and is one of the 20 most popular TED talks of all time.

Meyer is the CEO of Calibrate, a company that trains financial institutions, insurance providers, law firms and human resource professionals on verbal and non-verbal cues to deception, facial micro-expression interpretation, advanced interrogation techniques and information elicitation.

== Early life and education ==
Meyer was born and raised in Washington, DC. She is a graduate of Sidwell Friends School. She majored in psychology and political science at Washington University in St. Louis, and earned a master's degree in public policy as a Coro fellow at Claremont Graduate University. She received an MBA from Harvard Business School in 1986.

== Career ==
Meyer's early career was focused on media. Prior to attending business school, she co-founded California Community TV Network, a non-profit focused on community action and public broadcasting in Northern California. After receiving her MBA she held senior positions at Electronic Arts, National Geographic, The Ford Foundation and Vestron. In 1995, she founded Manhattan Studios, a New-York based incubator and new media company focused on strategic investments. In 2003, she launched Simpatico Networks, an affinity-based network of websites. Partially funded by Zelnick Media, the network included faith.com and expats.com.

Meyer became interested in the science of deception through a workshop at a Harvard Business School reunion during which a professor detailed his findings on behaviors associated with lying. She subsequently worked with a team of researchers to survey and analyze existing research on deception from academics, experts, law enforcement, the military, espionage and psychology. Meyer also received advanced training in interrogation, microexpression analysis, statement analysis, behavior and body language interpretation, and emotion recognition.

Liespotting: Proven Techniques to Detect Deception, based on her training and research, was published by St. Martin's Griffin in 2010. In 2013, she founded Calibrate, a deception detection and insider-threat recognition training center.

== Personal life ==
Meyer and her husband, Frederick Kempe, have one daughter. They live in Washington, DC.
