= Duke Corporate Education =

American corporate education company

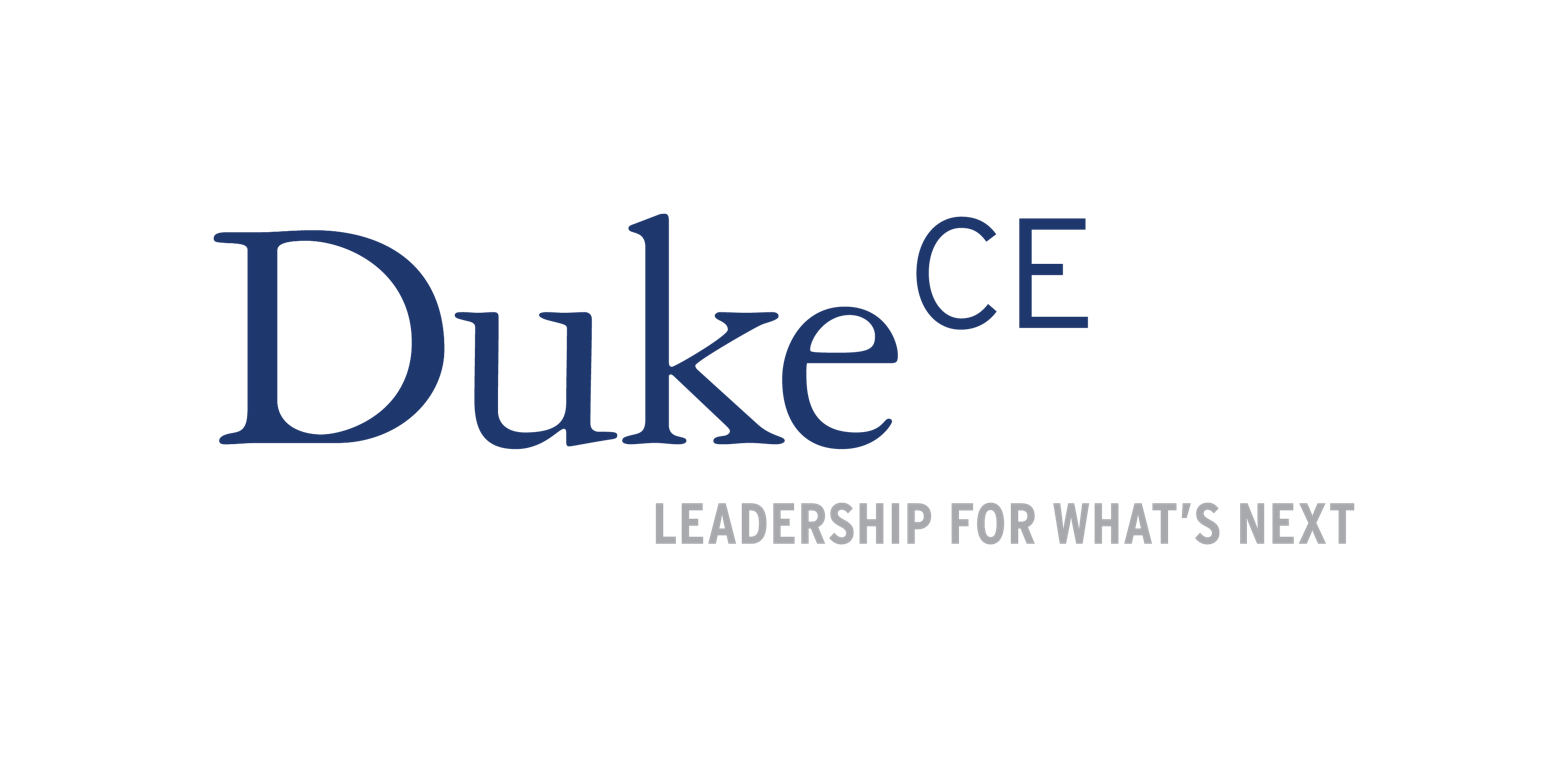
- Company type: Not-for-profit
- Industry: Corporate Education
- Founded: Durham, North Carolina, United States (2000)
- Headquarters: Durham, North Carolina, United States
- Number of locations: 4
- Area served: Worldwide
- Key people: Sharmla Chetty, CEO
- Owner: Duke University
- Number of employees: 115 (2014)

Duke Corporate Education (Duke CE) is a corporation education company owned by Duke University. It provides non-degree executive education and other development services to a worldwide market. Duke CE is a non-profit company, created in 2000 as a support organization of Duke’s Fuqua School of Business.

== History ==
Duke CE was established in July 2000, associated with Duke University's Fuqua School of Business.

On May 15, 2017, Duke CE announced a partnership with Strategy Execution (now Korn Ferry) for a training program.

== Ranking ==
Duke CE has been ranked among the top three providers in the world by the Financial Times for 19 years and #1 in BusinessWeek for 12 years. The In 2019, the Financial Times ranked Duke CE #2 in Customised Executive Education.

== Offices ==
Duke CE’s headquarters are in Durham, NC. Other offices are in London, Johannesburg and Singapore.

== Publishing ==
Dialogue is Duke CE's quarterly journal. It is published by LID Publishing and distributed free.
